= Wisdom's Dictates =

1691 book by Thomas Tryon

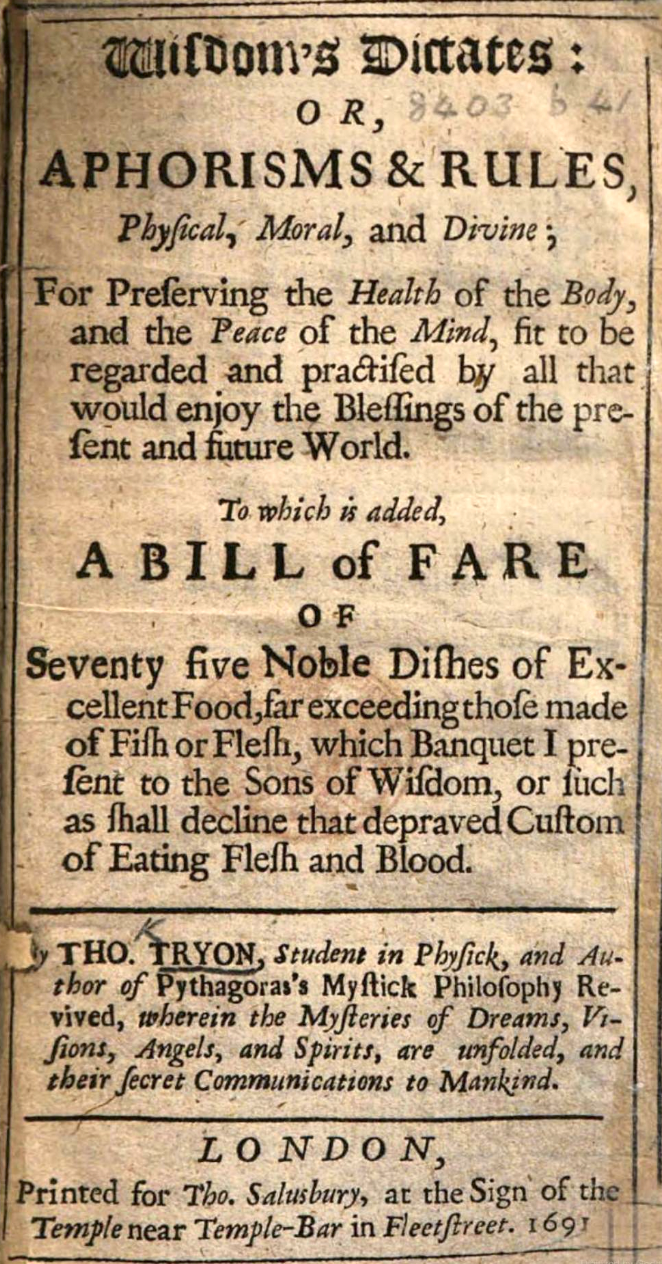
- First edition title page
- Author: Thomas Tryon
- Language: English
- Subject: Health; morality; religion; temperance; abstinence; vegetarianism
- Genre: Aphorisms; vegetarian cookbook
- Publisher: Thomas Salisbury
- Publication date: 1691
- Publication place: Kingdom of England
- Media type: Print
- OCLC: 14561039
- Text: Wisdom's Dictates at University of Michigan Library

Wisdom's Dictates (Note: Full title: Wisdom's Dictates: Or, Aphorisms & Rules, Physical, Moral, and Divine; for Preserving the Health of the Body, and the Peace of the Mind, Fit to Be Regarded and Practised by All That Would Enjoy the Blessings of the Present and Future World. To Which Is Added, A Bill of Fare of Seventy-Five Noble Dishes of Excellent Food, Far Exceeding Those Made of Fish or Flesh, Which Banquet I Present to the Sons of Wisdom, or Such as Shall Decline That Depraved Custom of Eating Flesh and Blood) is a 1691 book by the English writer Thomas Tryon. It contains aphorisms and advice on health, morality, religion, temperance and abstinence, followed by a vegetarian "Bill of Fare" of 75 dishes prepared without flesh or fish. Tryon advocates vegetarianism on moral, religious and health grounds.

== Background and publication ==
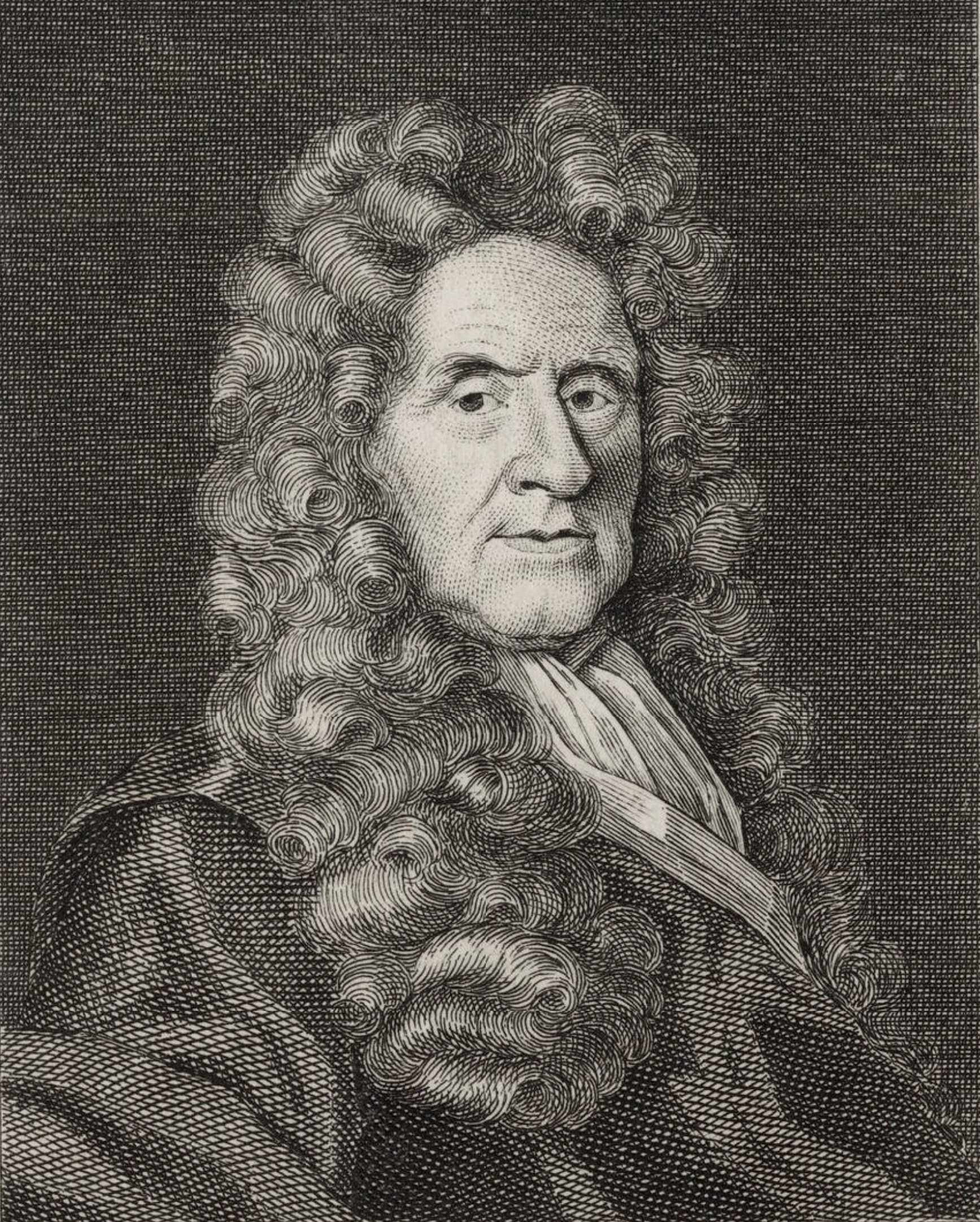
Thomas Tryon (1634–1703)

Thomas Tryon (1634–1703) was an advocate of vegetarianism, temperance and religiously grounded nonviolence. A merchant and convert to Anabaptism, he wrote books on health, diet and religious conduct.

Wisdom's Dictates was published in London by Thomas Salisbury in 1691. A second edition appeared in 1696.

== Contents ==
The book begins with an address to the reader, followed by aphorisms and rules described as "physical, moral, and divine". The subjects include health and abstinence, temperance, the biblical story of Cain and Abel, human inventions, the merits of bread and other foods, the dangers of fatty foods, religious worship and the nature of reason.

Tryon advises readers to avoid foods obtained through "violence and oppression", arguing that animals suffer when harmed and that every creature bears the image of God according to its nature. He presents compassion towards animals as a religious duty and condemns hunting, shooting and other activities involving violence towards them.

The concluding section, "A Bill of Fare", presents 75 vegetarian dishes as alternatives to meals prepared with flesh or fish. Tryon describes the dishes as obtainable without the suffering or death of animals and appeals to readers to abandon the practice of killing and eating their fellow creatures. He argues that animals value their lives, just as humans do, and that people should treat other creatures as they would wish to be treated themselves.

The dishes include vegetable pottages, boiled dumplings and flummery.

== Later discussion ==
The Vegetarian Resource Group has suggested that Wisdom's Dictates was probably the book by Tryon that Benjamin Franklin encountered as a young printer's apprentice in the 1720s. Franklin recalled reading a work by Tryon that recommended a vegetable diet, which he subsequently adopted for a time. Larry Kaiser of the Vegetarian Resource Group describes Wisdom's Dictates as a condensed version of Tryon's longer writings on health and diet.

The book was included in Feast & Fast: The Art of Food in Europe, 1500–1800, an exhibition at the Fitzwilliam Museum. The museum described it as a guide to living a healthier and more godly life through vegetarianism, without killing animals for food.

== See also ==
- The Way to Health – 1683 book by Thomas Tryon
- Christian vegetarianism
- Ethical vegetarianism
- History of vegetarianism
- Vegetarianism in the Romantic era
