= The Way to Health, Long Life and Happiness =

1683 book by Thomas Tryon

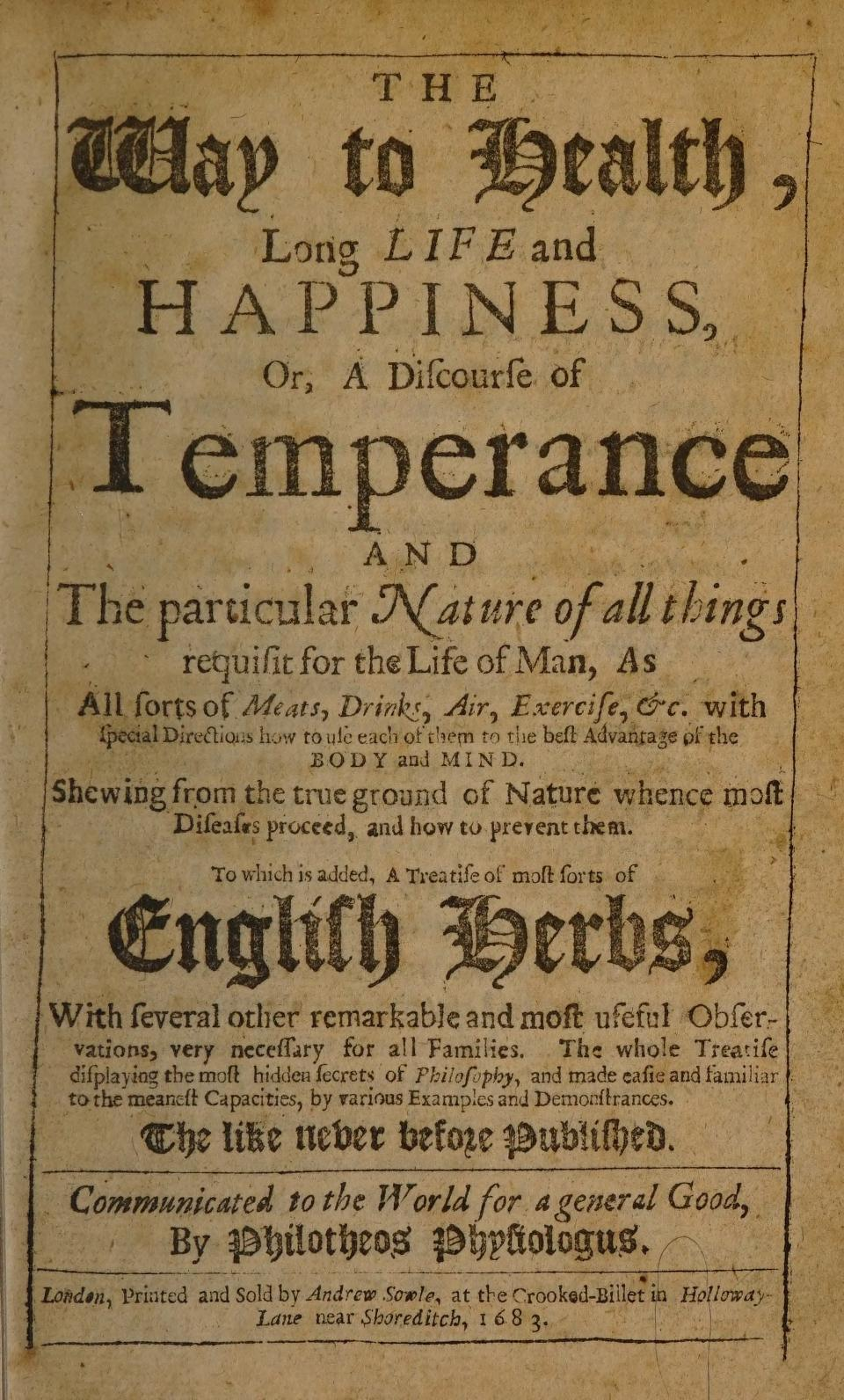
- First edition title page
- Author: Thomas Tryon (as Philotheos Physiologue)
- Language: English
- Subject: Dietetics; Health; Temperance; Vegetarianism; Treatment of animals
- Publisher: Andrew Sowle
- Publication date: 1683
- Publication place: Kingdom of England
- Pages: 669
- OCLC: 1700398
- Text: The Way to Health, Long Life and Happiness at the Internet Archive

The Way to Health, Long Life and Happiness (Note: Full title: The Way to Health, Long Life and Happiness, Or, a Discourse of Temperance and the Particular Nature of All Things Requisit for the Life of Man: As All Sorts of Meats, Drinks, Air, Exercise, &c. With Special Directions How to Use Each of Them to the Best Advantage of the Body and Mind: Shewing From the True Ground of Nature Whence Most Diseases Proceed, and How to Prevent Them: to Which Is Added, a Treatise of Most Sorts of English Herbs, With Several Other Remarkable and Most Useful Observations, Very Necessary for All Families, the Whole Treatise Displaying the Most Hidden Secrets of Philosophy, and Made Easie and Familiar to the Meanest Capacities, by Various Examples and Demonstrances: the Like Never Before Published) is a 1683 book by the English merchant and writer Thomas Tryon. It offers advice on diet, temperance, hygiene, and health, alongside arguments for vegetarianism and against cruelty to animals. The work has been discussed in histories of vegetarianism and animal rights.

== Background and publication ==
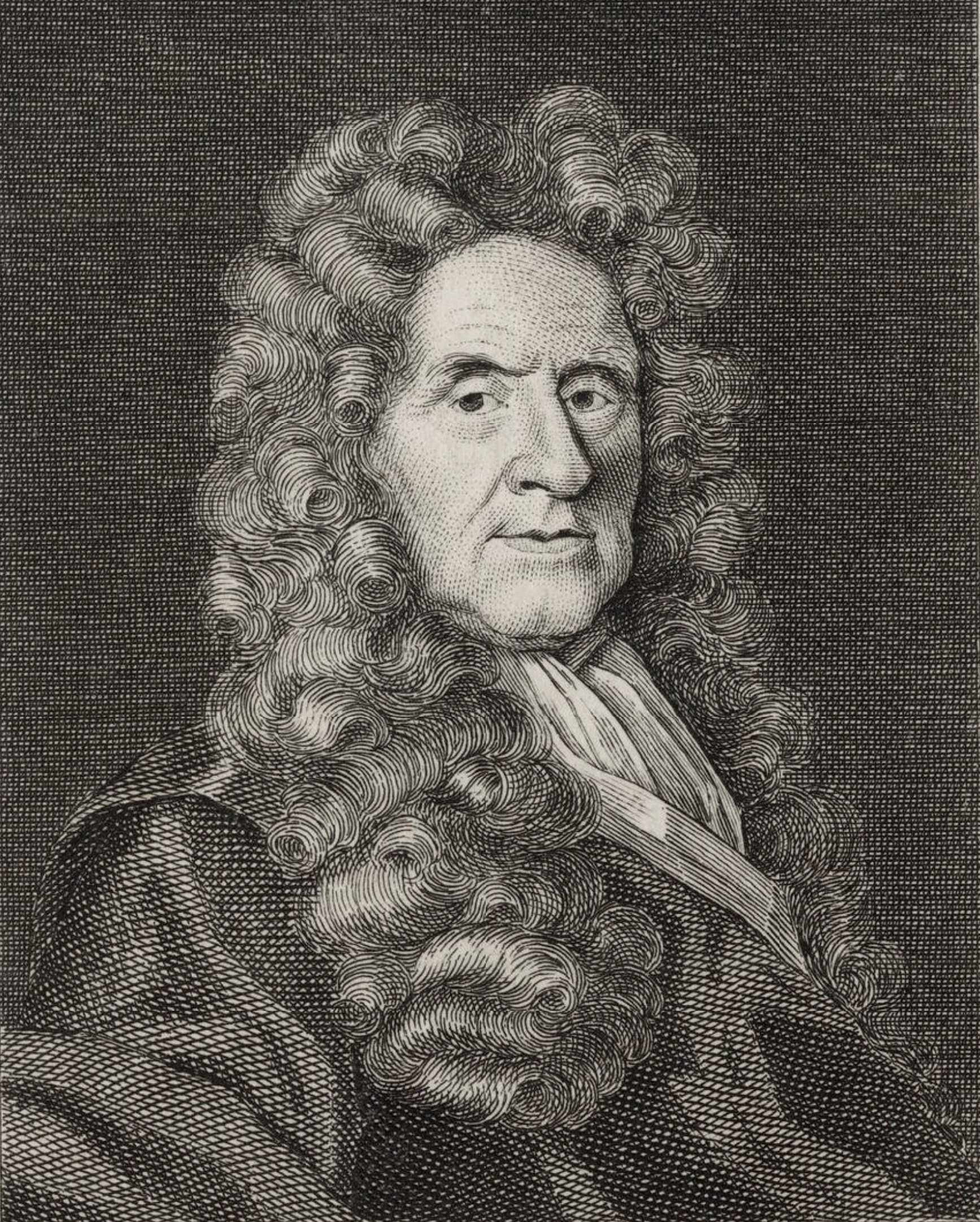
Thomas Tryon (1634–1703)

Thomas Tryon (1634–1703) was an English merchant, writer, and religious thinker who advocated vegetarianism and wrote about health, temperance, and moral reform. Born in Bibury, Gloucestershire, he worked in wool-spinning and as a shepherd before moving to London, where he became an apprentice hatter and later prospered in the hat trade. According to Howard Williams, Tryon adopted a vegetarian diet at the age of 23.

Tryon wrote conduct and advice manuals addressing temperance, health, diet, the treatment of animals, and slavery. Many of his works were published by the Quaker printer Andrew Sowle.

The Way to Health, Long Life and Happiness was published in London by Sowle in 1683 under the pseudonym Philotheos Physiologue. Its title page describes the work as a "discourse of temperance" concerning "all sorts of meats, drinks, air, exercise, &c.", with instructions for their use to "the best advantage of the body and mind". The book appeared in three editions during Tryon's lifetime and was reprinted in the eighteenth century.

== Contents ==
The book examines the effects of food, drink, and other aspects of daily life on physical and mental health. Tryon recommends a diet based on herbs, fruits, grains, bread, pulses, dairy products, and oils, arguing that these provide better nourishment than flesh. He also associates excessive consumption and rich foods with disease.

In the chapter "Of Flesh and its Operation on the Body and the Mind", Tryon condemns the slaughter of animals for food and argues that habitual killing encourages cruelty and violence towards other people. He criticises the assumption that meat provides superior nourishment, describing it as more liable to putrefaction and less conducive to health than vegetable foods. Although he advocates abstaining from flesh, the book also contains advice on selecting and preparing meat. Tryon explains that he included this material because he expected many readers to continue eating it.

Tryon presents sheep as examples of meekness, innocence, and peaceful coexistence. He praises their simple diet, social behaviour, and harmlessness, regarding them as models for human conduct. In passages including "The Sheep's Complaint", he gives animals imagined voices with which to protest their treatment by humans. These complaints address neglect, poor husbandry, slaughter, and the suffering of working and domestic animals.

The third edition, published in 1697, includes a dialogue between an East Indian Brahmin and a French gentleman concerning European affairs. Williams described the dialogue as a criticism of warfare, particularly religious war, in which Tryon connected human violence with the slaughter of animals.

== Reception and influence ==
The writer Aphra Behn responded favourably to The Way to Health, composing a poem in praise of Tryon that was subsequently included in the book's third edition. According to historian Geoffrey Plank, Behn also stopped eating meat and wearing leather after reading the work.

Tryon's arguments also attracted criticism. In 1685, the Quaker writer John Field published The Absurdity and Falseness of Thomas Trion's Doctrine, attacking claims made in The Way to Health and several of Tryon's other books. Field challenged Tryon's opposition to flesh-eating on religious grounds and ridiculed his use of speaking animals to express moral arguments.

Benjamin Franklin later recalled in his Autobiography that, at about the age of 16, he had read "a book written by one Tryon, recommending a vegetable diet" and consequently adopted the diet for a time. Franklin did not identify the book by title. Williams attributed his conversion to The Way to Health, while Larry Kaiser, writing for the Vegetarian Resource Group, suggests that Franklin probably read Wisdom's Dictates (1691), a digest of Tryon's longer work. Avery Yale Kamila et al. likewise identify The Way to Health as the work that influenced Franklin. Franklin wrote that his vegetarian diet allowed him to save money for books and gave him more time for study during his apprenticeship.

In The Ethics of Diet (1883), Williams described Tryon as one of the better-known seventeenth-century "humane Hygeists" and discussed The Way to Health at length, reproducing passages concerning diet, animal slaughter, and the relationship between cruelty to animals and human violence.

In Keyguide to Information Sources in Animal Rights (1989), Charles R. Magel described The Way to Health as "perhaps the first publication in English language using the term 'rights' in regard to animals". He cited Tryon's reference to the "rights and privileges of the inferiour creatures", alongside sections titled "The Complaint of the Cows", "The Sheep's Complaint", and "The Horses' Complaint".

== See also ==
- Wisdom's Dictates – 1691 book by Thomas Tryon
- Christian vegetarianism
- History of animal rights
- History of vegetarianism
- Vegetarianism in the Romantic era
