= Bloodless Revolution (disambiguation) =

The Bloodless Revolution is a reference to the Glorious Revolution in England in 1688.

Bloodless Revolution may also refer to:

- The "bloodless revolution" in Rhode Island politics in 1935 under Theodore F. Green
- The People Power Revolution in the Philippines in 1986, which ultimately deposed Ferdinand Marcos
- The Bloodless Revolution (book), a cultural history of vegetarianism by Tristram Stuart
