= J. L. Buttner =

American physician

Jacques Louis Buttner
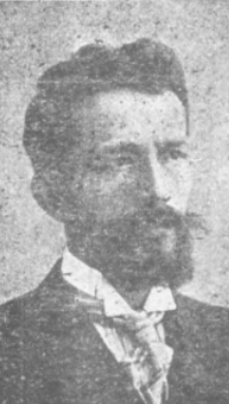
- Born: 1876
- Died: Unknown
- Education: Yale Medical School
- Occupations: Physician, writer

Jacques Louis Buttner (born 1876) was a French American physician and vegetarianism activist.

== Biography ==
Buttner obtained his M.D. from Yale Medical School in 1909 and received the Campbell Gold Medal for the highest rank on his examination and the Keese Prize for his thesis. In 1916, Buttner was described by the editor of the Journal of the American Medical Association as a "recognized representative in the literature of vegetarianism." He argued for vegetarianism from a scientific basis.

Buttner practiced medicine in New Haven, Connecticut. He was a member of the New Haven County Medical Association.

In 1923, The New International Encyclopedia's entry for vegetarianism noted that "Buttner described a vegetarian as one who does not habitually make use of flesh food, in contradistinction to the habitual meat eater."

== A Fleshless Diet ==
Buttner is best known for his vegetarian book A Fleshless Diet, published in 1910. It was widely reviewed in medical journals with a mixed response.

Buttner argued that comparative anatomy and nutrition demonstrates that man is suited for a fleshless diet and that meat is dangerous and unnecessary. His recommended diet consisted of vegetables, eggs and milk. Buttner wrote that "It is not illogical for vegetarians to use milk and eggs, as these animal products are distinctly less toxic than meat and also less likely to be disease-laden. They are obtained with a minimum of suffering on the part of the animals which furnish them to us."

A review in the American Physical Education Review, praised the book for compiling useful dietetic research but commented that it failed to show scientific discretion in the selected material. A review in the Journal of the American Medical Association recommended the book as a reference work whether or not one accepts Buttner's conclusions. A review in The Medical Standard, noted that the book was a "piece of special pleading for the propaganda which it is designed to promote […] We may say this, however, for Dr. Buttner, that he has managed to present a much more rational and scientific case in behalf of a vegetable diet than most of those who have heretofore made the attempt."

A negative review of the book in The Medical Era suggested that "Dr Buttner has correlated the usual arguments in favor of a vegetable diet, but has failed to show any scientific basis for the conclusions which he draws." A review in the Yale Medical Journal concluded that "we do not agree that the total abstinence from flesh foods will produce the beneficial results that he maintains."

It was positively reviewed in the Life and Health magazine as "so carefully written that it is worthy of consideration." The American Journal of Clinical Medicine also positively reviewed the book as a "very reasonable and believable argument against the use of meat."

== Selected publications ==
- A Fleshless Diet: Vegetarianism as a Rational Dietary (New York, 1910)
- An Author's Defence of His Book on Vegetarianism (Yale Alumni Weekly, 1910)
- Vegetarianism (New York Medical Journal, 1911)
- Vegetarianism (Journal of the American Medical Association, 1912)
- Correspondence: Early Man and Meat Diet (Journal of the American Medical Association, 1916)

== See also ==
- Ovo-lacto vegetarianism
