= The Bloodless Revolution (book) =

2006 book by Tristram Stuart

- Author: Tristram Stuart
- Language: English
- Published: 2006 HarperCollins; W. W. Norton & Company
- Publication place: United Kingdom
- Media type: Print
- Pages: xxvi, 628, [24] plates
- ISBN: 978-0-00-712892-1
- Dewey Decimal: 613.2/6209 22
- LC Class: TX392 .S86 2007

The Bloodless Revolution: Radical Vegetarianism and the Discovery of India is a 2006 non-fiction book by English author Tristram Stuart. It was published in the United States as The Bloodless Revolution: A Cultural History of Vegetarianism From 1600 to Modern Times.

The book documents the history of vegetarianism in Europe over the last 400 years and argues that Western vegetarian diets were influenced by travellers' tales from India. Stuart explores the vegetarianism of Thomas Bushell, John Robins, Thomas Tryon, George Cheyne, Roger Crab, John Oswald and others.

== Reception ==
Historian Chandak Sengoopta commented that "The Bloodless Revolution is a wonderful book, crammed with original research and written with verve, wit and passion. The most enthralling work of cultural history I have read in years, it brings out the political, ethical and environmental implications of our dietary choices without any preachiness." Philosopher A. C. Grayling praised the historical research of the book.

The book was positively reviewed by Publishers Weekly who suggested that "Stuart offers a masterful social and cultural history of a movement that changed the ways people think about the food they eat." A review by Kirkus Reviews described it as "Culinary and cultural history intertwined: readable, and endlessly interesting."

== See also ==
- Vegetarianism in the Romantic Era
