= Tristram Stuart =

British author and activist

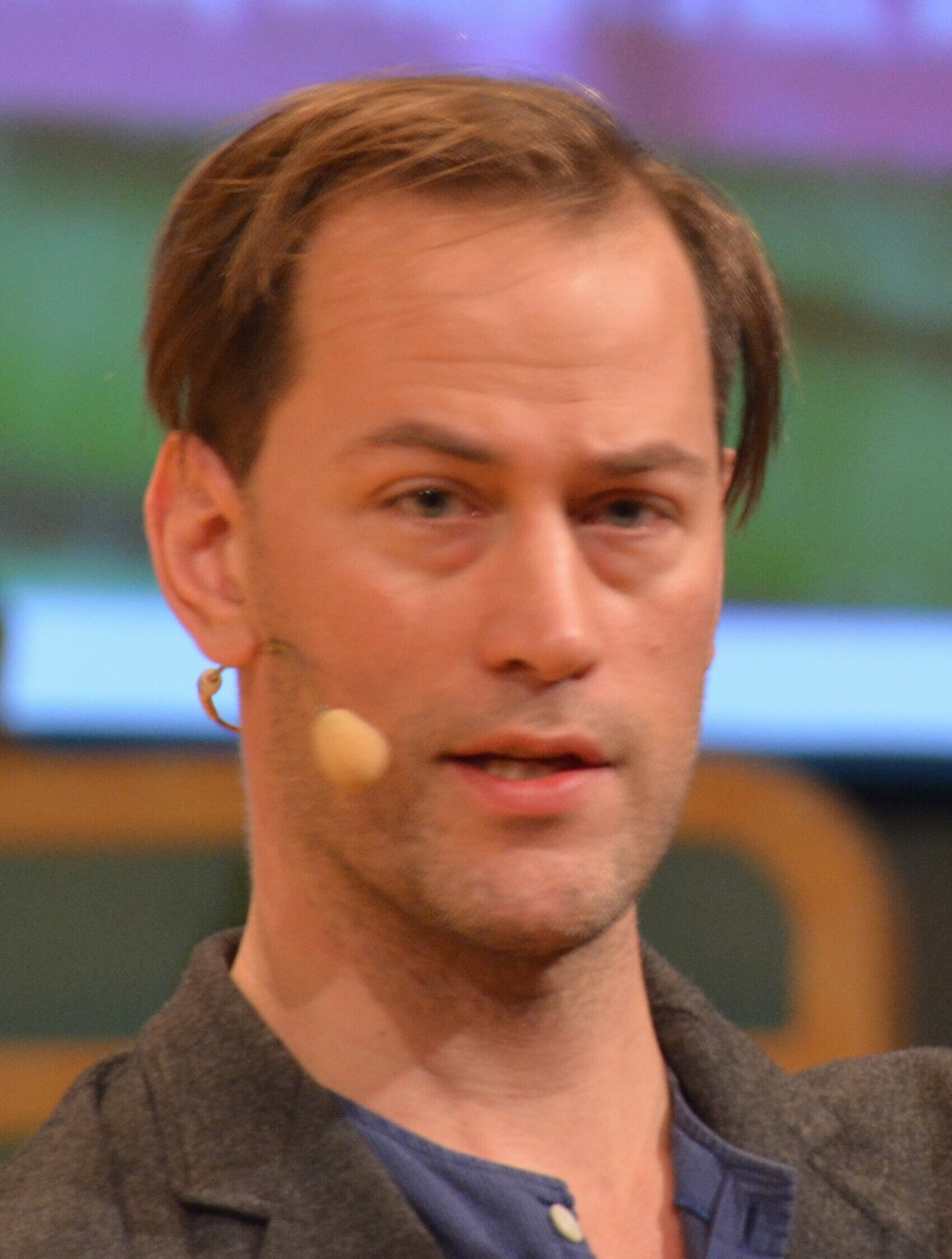
- Stuart in 2016
- Born: Tristram James Avondale Stuart; 12 March 1977 (age 49); London, England
- Education: Sevenoaks School
- Alma mater: Trinity Hall, Cambridge
- Occupations: Author, activist
- Known for: Feeding the 5000 (London, 2009), founder of the charity Feedback (2013), founder of Toast Ale (2016)
- Website: www.tristramstuart.co.uk

Tristram James Avondale Stuart (born 12 March 1977) is an English author and campaigner.

== Family and education ==
Born to Simon Walter Erskine Stuart (1930−2002) and Deborah Jane Mounsey, Stuart is the grandson of Arthur Stuart, 7th Earl Castle Stewart. He was educated at Sevenoaks School before going up to Trinity Hall, Cambridge to read English.

== Biography ==
In 2011 Tristram Stuart won the international environmental Sophie Prize and the "Observer Food Monthly Outstanding Contribution Award" for his ongoing campaign to solve the global food waste scandal. At the University of Cambridge Stuart won the Betha Wolferstan Rylands prize and the Graham Storey prize; his directors of studies were Peter Holland and John Lennard. He is the author of The Bloodless Revolution: Radical Vegetarians and the Discovery of India (Harper Collins Ltd, 2006) published in the United States as The Bloodless Revolution: A Cultural History of Vegetarianism From 1600 to Modern Times (W.W. Norton, 2007). His second book Waste: Uncovering the Global Food Scandal (Penguin, 2009; W.W. Norton, 2009) has been translated into several languages and won the IACP Cookbook Award for Literary Food Writing. He is a regular contributor to newspapers, and radio [including a short programme on BBC Radio 4 in 2012 titled: 'How to waste less food'] and television programs in the UK, US and Europe on the subject of food, the environment and freeganism.

He lives in England and in December 2009 launched a food waste campaign by organising "Feeding the 5000" in London's Trafalgar Square in which 5,000 people were served free curry, smoothies and fresh groceries from cast off vegetables and other food that otherwise would have been wasted to raise awareness for reducing food waste. This was similar to Food Not Bombs and other campaigns. He founded the charity Feedback which has replicated the Feeding the 5000 campaign and event model in several countries and has now been commissioned by the European Commission and the United Nations Environment Programme (UNEP) to spread the campaign globally. Other campaigns by Feedback include The Pig Idea and the Gleaning Network.

Stuart spoke at the We are fed up!-demonstrations in January 2014 in Berlin.

In 2016 he started "Toast Ale", a company that makes ale from surplus bread. Stuart stated: "We hope to eventually put ourselves out of business.The day there's no waste bread is the day Toast ale can no longer exist."

== Bibliography ==
- The Bloodless Revolution: A Cultural History of Vegetarianism From 1600 to Modern Times. Norton. 2006. ISBN 978-0-393-05220-6.
- Waste: Uncovering the Global Food Scandal. Penguin. 2009. ISBN 978-0-14-103634-2.

== See also ==
- Food Not Bombs
- Farmageddon
- OzHarvest
