= The Medical Standard =

- Discipline: Medicine
- Language: English

Publication details
- Former name(s): North American Practitioner
- History: 1887–1931
- Publisher: G.P. Engelhard & Co. (United States)

Standard abbreviations
- ISO 4: Med. Stand.

Indexing
- OCLC no.: 1757028

The Medical Standard was an American medical journal published by G.P. Engelhard in Chicago, Illinois starting in 1887, and running through at least 1931.

According to a Hathitrust record, the previous title was the North American Practitioner.
