= Thomas Tryon =

English merchant and writer (1634–1703)

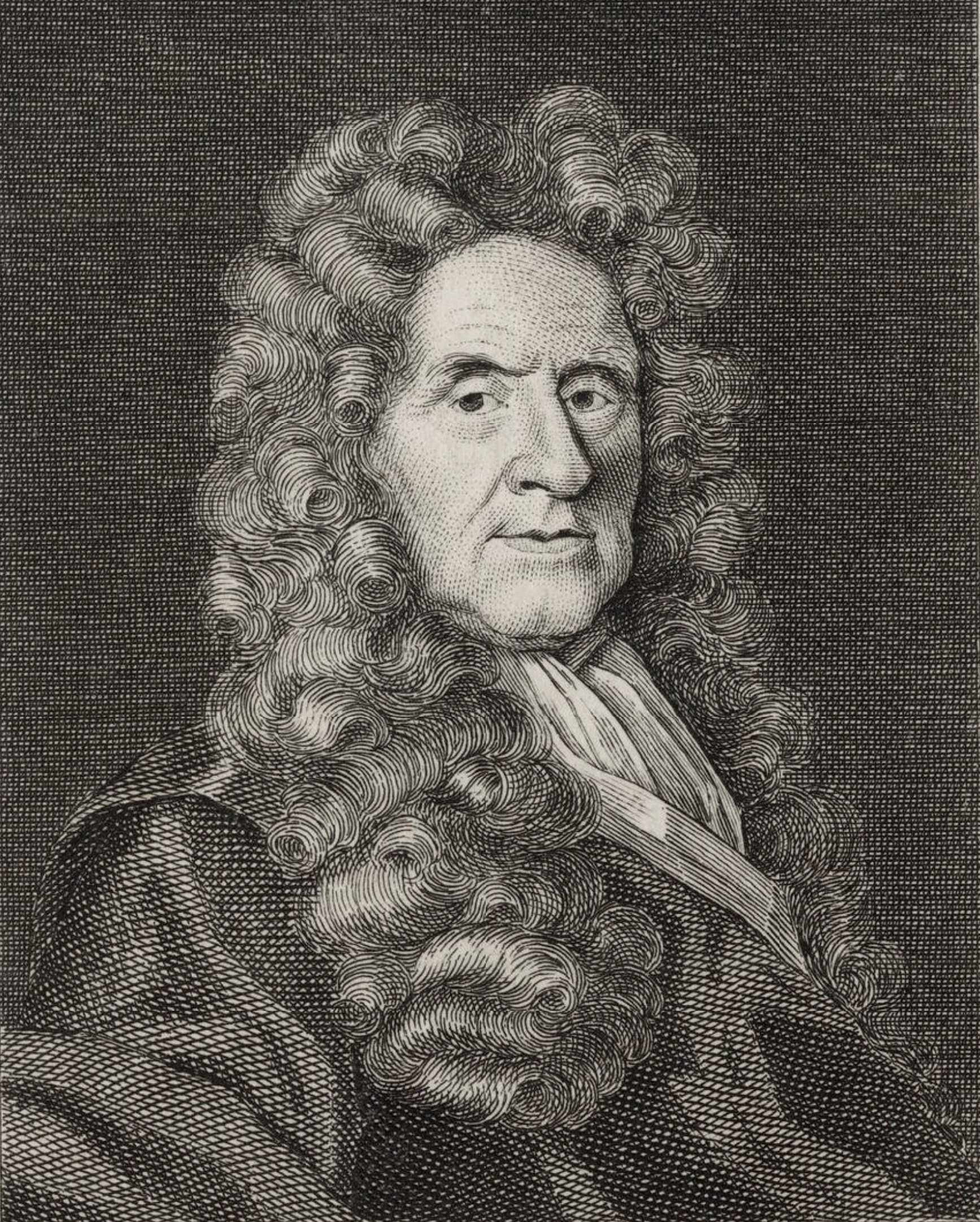
- Engraved portrait of Tryon by R. Grave, after Robert White
- Born: 6 September 1634; Bibury, Gloucestershire, England
- Died: 21 August 1703 (aged 68); Hackney, London, England
- Occupations: Merchant; writer
- Notable work: The Way to Health, Long Life and Happiness (1683); Wisdom's Dictates (1691)

Thomas Tryon (6 September 1634 – 21 August 1703) was an English merchant and writer. He wrote on diet, temperance, health, education, slavery and the treatment of animals, and is associated with the early history of vegetarianism, animal rights and abolitionism.

== Life ==
Tryon was born in 1634 in Bibury, near Cirencester, Gloucestershire. He worked as a wool-spinner as a child and received no formal education. As a teenager, he worked as a shepherd until the age of eighteen, learning to read and write in his spare time. In 1652 he moved to London without telling his parents and was apprenticed to a hatter in the Bridewell area.

Tryon became an Anabaptist in 1654 under the influence of his master. He was attracted to the congregation's asceticism, but later developed an independent religious outlook after reading Jakob Böhme. In 1657 he said that he heard an inner voice, which he called the "Voice of Wisdom", urging him to become a vegetarian and follow a frugal diet. He married in 1661, but did not persuade his wife to adopt his diet.

Tryon travelled to Barbados hoping to succeed in the hat trade and benefit from greater religious tolerance, but was disturbed by the treatment of enslaved people on the plantations. In 1669 he returned to London and settled in Hackney. In 1682 he said that the same inner voice instructed him to write and publish books promoting temperance and nonviolence.

During the last two decades of his life, Tryon published 27 works on subjects including education, diet, abstinence from alcohol and tobacco, health, and the treatment of enslaved people. He continued in the hat trade and became wealthy. Some of his books sold well. He died in Hackney on 21 August 1703. His memoirs, Some Memoirs of the Life of Mr. Thomas Tryon, Late of London, Merchant, were published posthumously in 1705.

== Writings and influence ==
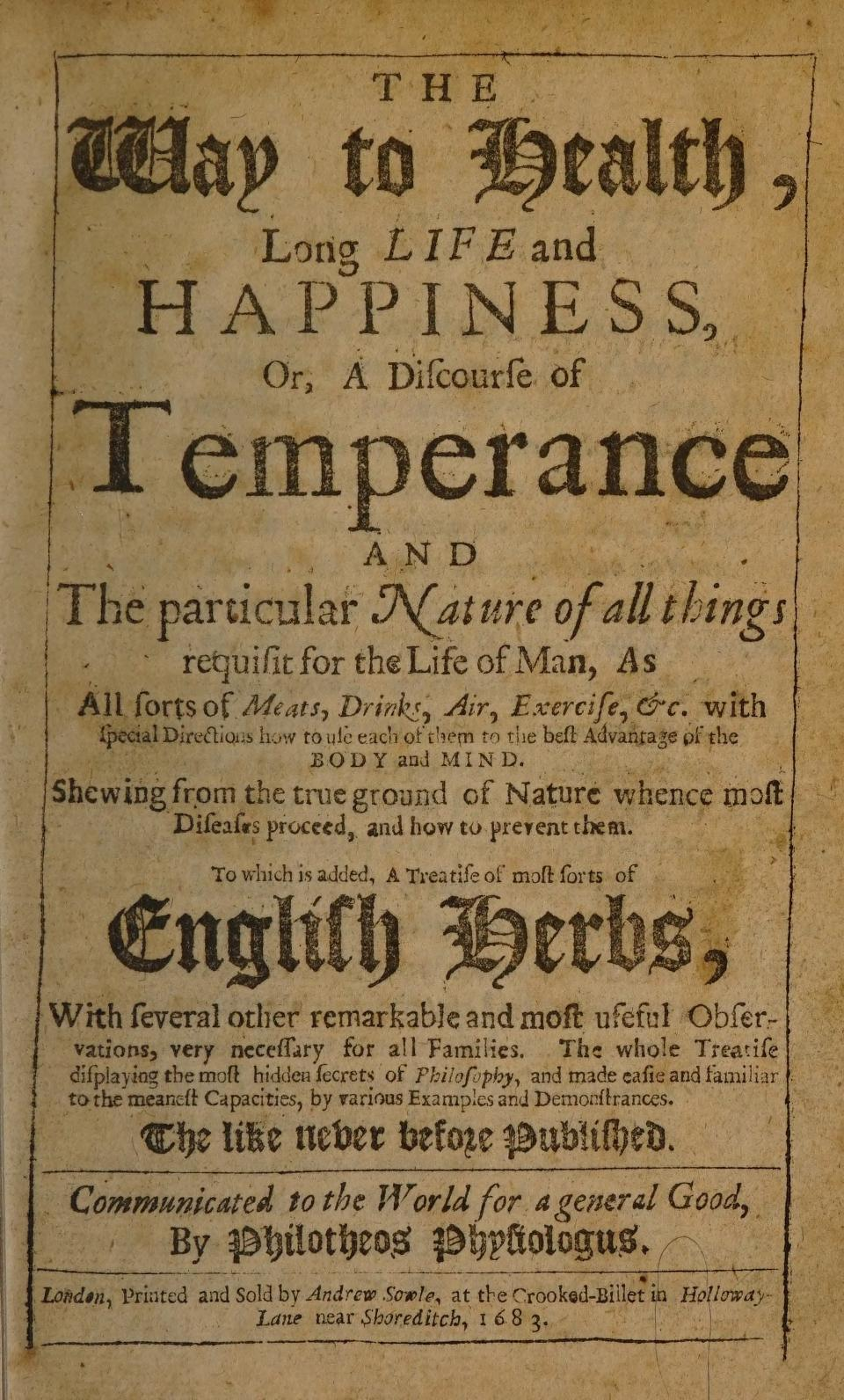
First edition title page of The Way to Health, Long Life and Happiness (1683)

Tryon's best-known book was The Way to Health, Long Life and Happiness, published in 1691 as a second edition of Health's Grand Preservative; or, The Women's Best Doctor (1682). It influenced Benjamin Franklin, who wrote that he adopted a vegetarian diet after reading Tryon's work. Tryon's writings were also read by Aphra Behn, whose poem "On the Author of that Excellent Book Intitled The way to HEALTH, LONG LIFE, and HAPPINESS" appeared in the 1697 edition of The Way to Health, and by Percy Bysshe Shelley.

== Ideas ==
Tryon's religious and philosophical views were influenced by ancient Pythagoreanism, Hinduism and the writings of Heinrich Cornelius Agrippa. He described himself as a Christian and attempted to reconcile biblical, Pythagorean and Hindu teachings. He argued that there had been one original religion of humanity, followed by Moses, Pythagoras and the Indian Brahmins, but later corrupted by most Christians.

Tryon treated pacifism, nonviolence towards animals, benevolence to all species and abstention from meat as parts of spiritual discipline and as conditions for the restoration of Paradise. He wrote in defence of animals and against cruelty to them. He also wrote that human beings were a miniature image of the universe, or microcosm, and expressed concern about polluted rivers and deforestation. Tryon did not believe in reincarnation, but held that the souls of sinners could take the forms of vicious beasts in an afterlife.

Tryon has been discussed in histories of animal rights. Several writers have described him as the first known author to use the word "rights" in relation to animals, in The Way to Health, Long Life and Happiness. In that book, he wrote that humans tried to become "an absolute Monarch or arbitrary Tyrant", invading and destroying "all the Rights and Priviledges of the inferiour Creatures".

== Publications ==
- The Way to Health, Long Life and Happiness (1683)
- Wisdom's Dictates, or, Aphorisms & Rules, Physical, Moral, and Divine, for Preserving the Health of the Body, and the Peace of the Mind (1691)
- A Treatise of Cleanness in Meats and Drinks, of the Preparation of Food, the Excellency of Good Airs, and the Benefits of Clean Sweet Beds (1682)
- The Knowledge of a Man's Self the Surest Guide to the True Worship of God, and Good Government of the Mind and Body (1703)

== See also ==
- Benjamin Lay, an early abolitionist who was influenced by Tryon
- List of abolitionist forerunners
- History of animal rights
- History of vegetarianism
- Vegetarianism in the Victorian era
