= Vegetarian Resource Group =

American nonprofit organization

- Abbreviation: VRG
- Formation: 1982; 44 years ago
- Founded at: Baltimore, Maryland
- Type: Nonprofit
- Legal status: 501(c)(3) organization
- Purpose: Promotion of veganism
- Region served: United States
- Official language: English
- Board of directors: Charles Stahler; Debra Wasserman
- Main organ: Vegan Journal
- Website: vrg.org

The Vegetarian Resource Group (VRG) is an American 501(c)(3) non-profit organization dedicated to educating the public on veganism and its relation to health, nutrition, ecology and ethics. The Vegetarian Resource Group is based in Baltimore, Maryland and publishes the Vegan Journal.

== History ==
The Vegetarian Resource Group was founded in September 1982 by Charles Stahler and Debra Wasserman with the assistance of Audrey Fluke, Norris Fluke and Ernie Kopstein. Stahler became vegan in 1977 and Wasserman in 1980. The organization was originally named Baltimore Vegetarians. In 1989 it was renamed the Vegetarian Resource Group as its publications gained national interest.

Between 1982 and 1984 the VRG sponsored Sandy Weinstein's tofu cooking class. In 1983 their first book was published, Vegetarianism for the Working Person. They published I Love Animal and Broccoli Activity Book in 1995. Over 130,000 copies were given to pupils and teachers. Debra Wasserman volunteered on the Giant Supermarket Consumer Board by giving her input on non-dairy sources of calcium which were put in their nutrition brochures. In 1997, the VRG collaborated with the National Meals on Wheels Foundation and the National Association of Nutrition and Aging Services Programs to form the Vegetarian Initiative, a program to introduce meatless meal options into senior feeding programs. Their website was launched in 1997.

The Vegetarian Resource Group reported in 2003 that 50 restaurant owners at that year's National Restaurant Association Show mentioned the vegan veto vote affecting their businesses. A 2014 survey conducted by Harris Interactive for the VRG found that 4% of those aged from 8 to 18 identified as vegetarian. In December 2024, the VRG announced a $50,000 college scholarship award to graduating students who have promoted veganism in their schools or communities.

== Vegan Journal ==
The VRG published the Vegetarian Journal from 1982 to 2022. It offered practical advice to those on a vegetarian diet. It described itself as a "practical magazine for those interested in health, ecology and ethics". The journal was unlike Vegetarian Times as it did not support dairy or egg consumption and eschewed advertisements for supplements. Charles Stahler commented that many in the vegetarian movement were being charged a lot of money for supplements that were unnecessary. In January 2022, the Vegetarian Journal was renamed Vegan Journal.

== Selected publications ==
- Vegetarian Journal's Guide to Natural Foods Restaurants in the U.S. and Canada. Avery Publishing Group. 1998. ISBN 978-0895298379.
- Wasserman, Debra (2010). Vegan Handbook: Over 200 Delicious Recipes, Meal Plans, and Vegetarian Resources for All Ages. Vegetarian Resource Group. ISBN 978-0931411175.
