= Vegetarianism in the Romantic era =

Aspect of the history of vegetarianism

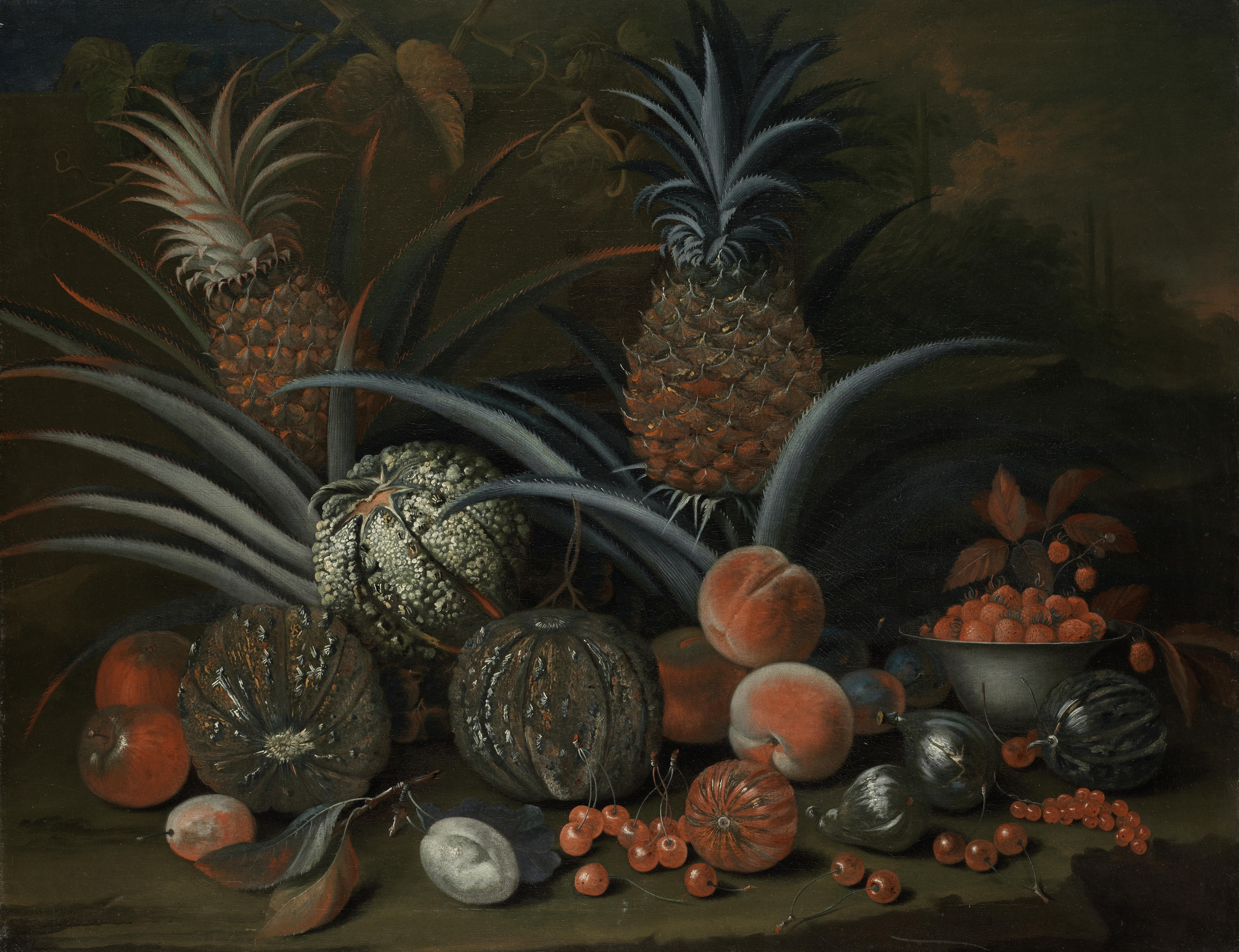
Still life of various fruits and vegetables by George William Sartorius

Vegetarianism in the Romantic era refers to the rise of vegetarianism associated with the Romanticism movement in Western Europe from the eighteenth to the nineteenth century. Many of the late Romantics argued in favor of a more natural diet which excluded animal flesh for a plethora of reasons including the state of human and animal health, religious beliefs, economy and class division, animal rights, literary influence, as well as from new ideas about anthropology, consumerism, and evolution. The modern vegetarian and vegan movements borrow some of the same principles from the late Romantics to promote the adoption of diets free from animal products.

England, Germany, and France were most affected by the turn to a predominantly meatless diet during this time. Vegetarianism in this period may also have been influenced by views on humanism developed during the Age of Enlightenment in the late eighteenth and early nineteenth centuries. Romantic literary personalities who gave impetus to the shift to vegetarianism included Percy Shelley in his A Vindication of Natural Diet, Mary Shelley, Alexander Pope, Thomas Tryon, Lord Byron and Joseph Ritson.

== Romantic support for vegetarianism ==
=== History ===
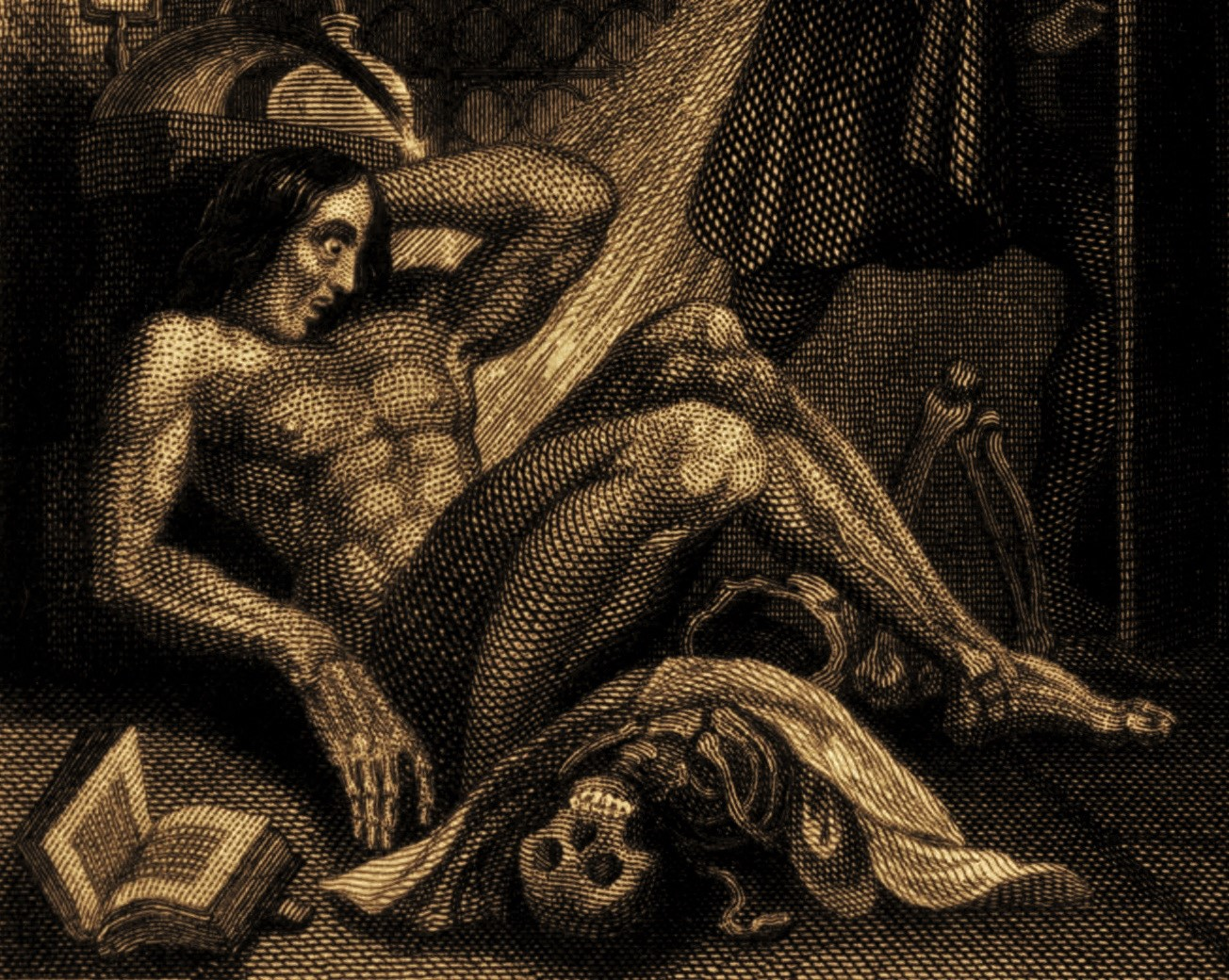
Frankenstein's monster, who was written as a vegetarian

Though the establishment of the Vegetarian Society begins in 1847, vegetarianism as a practice dates back long before the formation of this organization. Until the creation of the Vegetarian Society, vegetarians were referred to as Pythagoreans.

Romantic writers like Percy and Mary Shelley, Alexander Pope, Thomas Tryon and Joseph Ritson were promoters of vegetarianism. In her Frankenstein; or, The Modern Prometheus, Mary Shelley depicts The Creature of Dr. Frankenstein as a vegetarian. In an emotional speech the Creature tells how he will live in his self-imposed exile in South America:

My food is not that of man; I do not destroy the lamb and the kid, to glut my appetite; acorns and berries afford me sufficient nourishment. My companion will be of the same nature as myself, and will be content with the same fare. We shall make our bed of dried leaves; the sun will shine on us as on man, and will ripen our food. The picture I present to you is peaceful and human.

Essays and other literary works written by these influential Romantics supported a meatless diet. With ideologies rooted in Romantic aesthetics of compassion and communion with nature, these writers found the consumption of meat sacrilegious and inhumane. With the industrial revolution came a rebellion against the mass market economically centered consumerism that flourished during this period. Romantics favored a more primal communion with nature that had nothing to do with currency or economics. Increased prices on meat products, a result of profit-driven markets, and the growth of humanitarian feelings towards both human and animal rights led to a rise in vegetarianism. During the eighteenth century, with more varieties of vegetables available, practicing a meatless diet became much easier to maintain. Nearly every large town in Western Europe now had numerous gardens fully supplied with fruits and vegetables. Between the new accessibility of meat alternatives, Romantic ideals of nature and humanism, and the desire to rebel against consumerism and class distinctions, the vegetarian movement had begun.

=== Enlightenment and humanism ===
The vegetarian movement has a beginning during The Enlightenment when a shift in European attitudes towards justice, liberty, freedom, and brotherhood appears. The adoption of these new attitudes not only were applied to humans but were extended to all of god's creatures. John Locke thought that observation of animals showed that animals too could communicate, feel pain, and perhaps express emotion. Humanitarianism was extended to the animal kingdom because it was felt that there was little difference separating humans from the creatures. Moved by Locke's arguments people started to think that animals and humans were in some way interconnected. Being unkind toward animals man would most likely be unkind towards his fellow man. With such principles in mind, vegetarianism became the proper response, one fueled by both humanitarianism and compassion.

=== Economics and consumerism ===
Timothy Morton noted that, "by the Romantic period 'the consumer' had been born as an economic subject", classifying humans as commodifiable entities for market and economic profit. The shift to a meatless diet was seen by many as a way to distinguish oneself from an increasingly consumerist society fueled by industrialized living and profit-driven market conglomerates. An all-plant diet regime allowed those opposed to the present economic practices to exercise protest against consumerism by refusing the purchase of meat products. Romantic vegetarianism was a product of resistance to the "culture of luxury" which wove its way into the eighteenth and nineteenth centuries. With literary reformists like Shelley carrying the flag, the public turned to vegetarianism. Meat had become a symbol of consumerism, so the Romantics, in an attempt to alleviate the oppressive nature of man and politics, boycotted such consumption. Meat had also become a symbol of class separation, with wealthy class consumers demanding red meat, and lower-class families eating potatoes and vegetables. In order to oppose such social separations, a number of individuals from various classes sought to remove meat consumption, therefore removing such class distinctions in the process. Essentially, vegetarianism became a radical response to a consumer-based pseudo-culture driven primarily by commercialization and market profit. The vegetarian movement established a Romantic form of consumerism that rejected raising meat prices in a newly market-driven mass society.

=== Class ===
The ills of society according to the Romantics had much to do with defining people according to class, both by terms of race and gender as well as economic status. The Romantics were largely concerned with hierarchical oppression within economic classes and on a greater scale were concerned with how humankind fit into the natural world. Eating meat was considered a vice of the wealthy as they were the only class in society at the time who could afford it regularly. Poor society lived on more simple diet consisting of "bread, milk, porridge, potatoes and vegetables". The inability to buy the newest luxury, meat, led to many grievances between the classes. Often constrained by their finances, "vegetarians were to be found almost exclusively among the middle class intellectuals". Consuming meat became a symbol of wasteful decadence and greed, and a means to "gratify a guilty sensuality" as Thomas Day states in the History of Sanford and Merton. As the vegetarian Thomas Tryon espouses, "The eating of flesh and killing of creatures for that purpose, was never begun, nor is now continue'd for want of necessity, or for the maintenance of health, but chiefly because the high, lofty, spirit of wrath and sensuality had gotten the dominion of man, over the meek love, and innocent harmless nature, and being so rampant, could not be satisfy'd except it had a proportionable food".

Consuming meat was a symbol of booming consumerism in the 18th century. The idea emerged that by adopting a simple vegetarian diet that was accessible to all would increase food supply, decrease the demand for land and inevitably, class conflict would decrease. According to Morton, "food is the material embodiment of all kinds of social practices" and as such, the vegetarians of the Romantic Period took to another form of consumerism: the boycott of meat. It was thought therefore that the link between the oppressive nature of man and an "unkind and brutal" diet would diminish and man would take to his natural state of being within nature.

=== Evolution and nature ===
The eighteenth century brought with it new ideas of evolution and nature. Society now saw the environment and the organisms within it as more physically, biologically, and even emotionally complex. Biologists began to study the embryonic development and differences in individual organisms. With these new studies came new insight on the relationship between human and animal. French naturalist, Georges-Louis Leclerc, Comte de Buffon addressed ideas of common ancestry in his Histoire naturelle stating that many scientists believed "that man and ape have a common origin; that, in fact, all the families among plants as well as animals, have come from common stock". Theories of Charles Darwin, who claimed that all species were descended of common ancestors, also became prevalent in the early and mid-nineteenth century. These new scientific ideas stirred a great response from Romantic writers and members of European society who now began to see animals and man as interconnected.

=== Anthropology and physiognomy ===
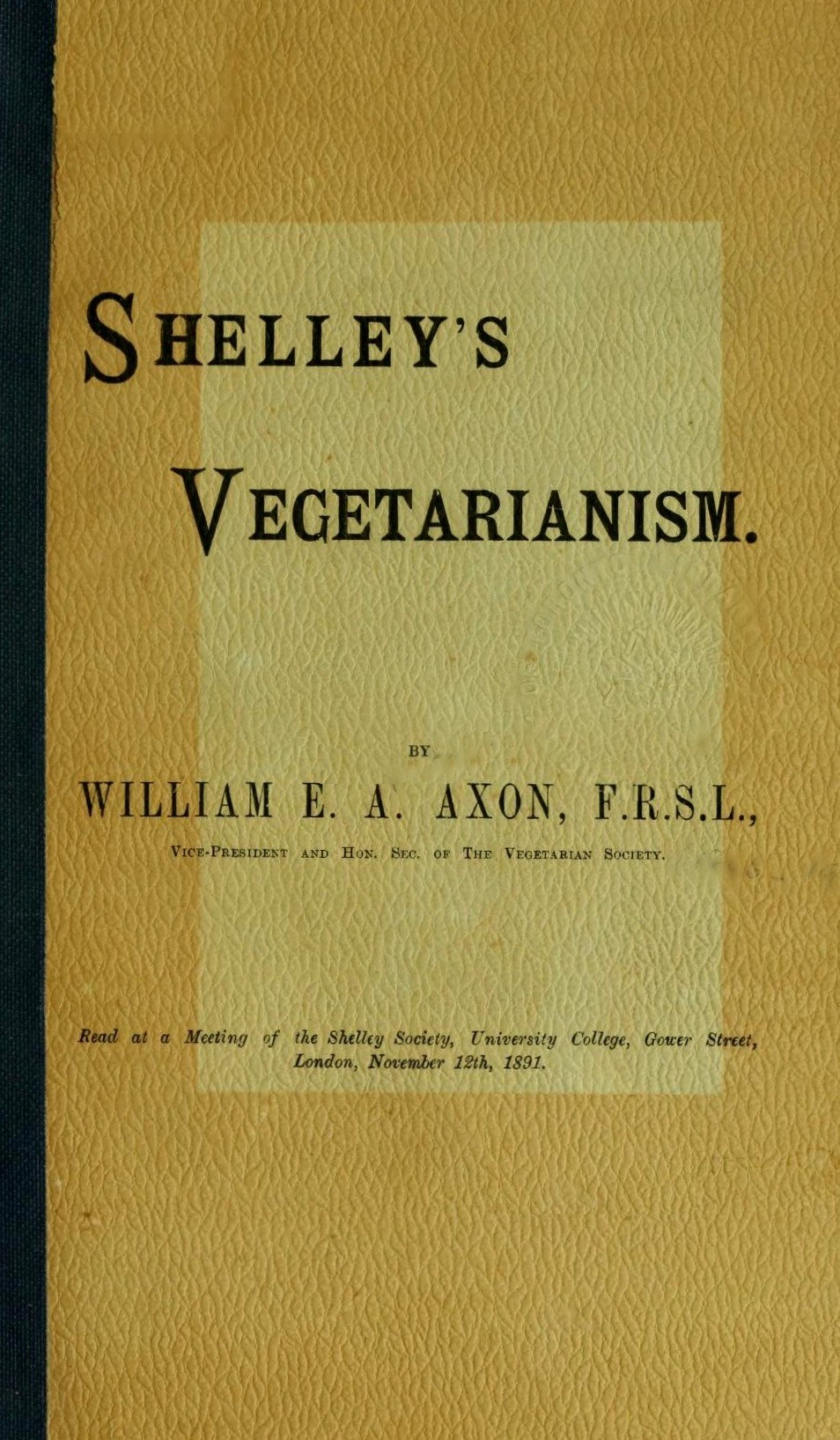
Front cover of Shelley's Vegetarianism, an 1891 pamphlet on Shelley's vegetarianism

In his Moral Essay upon Abstinence (1802), Joseph Ritson claimed "how unnatural flesh-eating is to human physiognomy and how such a diet of blood will engender ferocity in those who consume it". He and other Romantics saw the eating of animals as a violation of nature. Such views on anthropology and physiognomy contributed to the vegetarian movement in Western Europe because of societal desires to both connect with nature, as well as to remain somewhat connected to the past. Much of Romantic literature displayed themes centered on the evocation of the past. Early Romantics, facing a new, modern, shiny, machine-driven world hoped to maintain older values of religion, nature, and imagination by establishing and maintaining attachments to earlier history. A way to maintain this connection with earlier, less mechanic human beings was revert to previous diet practices, and it was thought that the more primitive humans had sustained themselves on a diet closer to a vegetarian lifestyle. Romantic writers including Ritson, Shelley, and Pope perceived the movement to vegetarianism as a way of returning to nature, reclaiming history, and turning away from animal or carnal savagery. Shelley promoted this idealist principle in A Vindication of Natural Diet, writing, "It is a man of violent passions, blood-shot eyes, and swollen veins, that alone can grasp the knife of murder...In no cases has a return to vegetable diet produced the slightest injury: in most it has been attended with changes undeniably beneficial". Fueled by literary Romantics like Ritson and Shelley, vegetarianism became a substitute for what had been deemed to be a savage, physiologically conflicted practice of blood consumption.

=== Health ===
In 1699 Edward Tyson documented the overwhelming similarities between humans and animals, particularly apes and monkeys, but it was during the Romantic Era that advances in anthropology and physiognomy began to shape societal views on where humans fit into the world. Knowledge about the similarities between human and animal anatomy gave rise to the belief that because non-human animal bodies are alike human bodies in regards to physical senses and emotional responses, consuming animals was morally wrong. Furthermore, it was believed to be beneficial for humans to return to a diet based on plant matter. As Joseph Ritson reasoned, "the teeth and intestines of man being like those of frugivorous animals, he should, naturally, be range'd in this class".

Other noted reasons for a vegetarian diet included reduced canine teeth and the lack of claws or talons in the human body which made it almost impossible to hunt and kill another animal without the aid of manufactured tools, as well as the length of the human intestines which made it more difficult to digest meat. George Cheyne, a physician who followed a vegetarian diet, concluded that diseases had increased and longevity had decreased largely due to the incorporation of meat into the diet. A vegetarian diet was promoted as the pure and natural diet, uncorrupted by the flesh of other living beings. As stated by Timothy Morton, "vegetarian food was thought to be closer in form to the diet of early humans...it was a symptom of the relatively developed but not yet decadent phase of agricultural society", decadence being the consumption of meat.

Humans were not the only ones thought to suffer physically under a diet rich in meat; animals themselves were suffering of infections and disease. Confinement of farm animals provided a conduit for disease and illness to spread among mistreated animals, according to Morris, and the food fed to farm animals was also brought into question as a factor contributing to widespread illness.

The notion "you are what you eat" traces its origins to the Romantic Era, which was intended to have physical and moral implications. Not only was meat thought to desecrate the human body, but it was also accredited with encouraging the consumption of alcohol and "other destructive habits of life". The Romantics secured the link between the physical and moral natures of man, as Percy Shelley states in Natural Diet, "I hold that the depravity of the physical and moral nature of man originated in his unnatural habits of life". As man was assumed to be naturally healthy, it was society that polluted his body; a case of diseased health erupting out of a diseased society.

=== Environment ===
Those committed to vegetarianism were also concerned with the health of the environment. Raising animals for food was very taxing on the environment, and highly inefficient as far as yielding the most food. As Shelley noted, "the quantity of nutritious vegetable matter, consumed in fattening the carcase of an ox, would afford ten times the sustenance if gathered immediately from the bosom of the earth". Animal husbandry was regarded as economically wasteful and an assault upon the relationship between nature's ability to provide food and man's harvesting of that food.

=== Religion ===
Prior to the Romantic Era, "vegetarianism had been primarily the reserve of religious mystics, ascetics and the odd quack physician". Yet with the rise of Romanticism, religion came under scrutiny and new meaning was found within old doctrine. Considering Christianity, vegetarians noted that only after the Flood was permission given to eat flesh and not beforehand, further promoting the belief that the true natural diet of man did not include meat. Thoughts of reincarnation gave rise to the consideration that animals had souls and as such demanded recognition as sentient beings. This line of thought is represented in A Mouse's Petition: "Beware, lest in the worm you crush/A brother's soul you find (lines 33–34).

== Discourse on rights ==
Until the Romantic Era, the chain of being that placed man above animal was widely accepted without challenge and was reflected in the understanding of man. Man was the link between nature and God, what was good about man reflected his connection to God, what was bad reflected man's primitive connection to nature and animals. The Romantic Era rebuked this belief. Robert Morris, an eighteenth-century architectural innovator, went as far as to say that "to usurp an Authority over any other part of the Chain is indeed Pride, rank Pride, and Haughtiness of Soul". The hierarchical chain of being began to narrow and a more inclusive empathy for all creatures dominated the vegetarian discourse of the period. Allowing for animals to have souls necessitated the reevaluation of man's place in the world, for man was no longer the sole inheritor of moral consideration.

Perhaps the most lasting effects of the vegetarian movement during the Romantic Period have to do with the rise of the animal rights movement, as well as the women's rights and civil rights movements that would gain momentum throughout the nineteenth century. Shelley declared that the European diet which included meat "was responsible for the worst elements of his society, citing cruelty, tyranny and slavery as direct results. As noted by Ruston, "The evidence used in the debates surrounding vegetarianism and vitality in the Romantic Period offered a means to argue for the equal rights of all men whether white or black, for women to be regarded as deserving equal rights to men, for dissenters to ask for toleration and enfranchisement and for the rights of animals.

The change in how people viewed their relationships between other humans and animals went through a dramatic change. Taking a lead from Pythagoras's Golden Rule of doing to others as would be done to oneself, a shift was made away from asserting human dominance over nature and in turn led to the notion that humans have no rights to nature as it is common to all creatures. This notion had a profound effect on the vegetarian movement, as Morris stated, "If we could claim no right to the bodies of animals, we had no power to destroy. The sparrow and the fish of the sea are in common to all, no man claims a particular right to them, therefore has no power by nature over them to kill". As Percy Shelley remarked, "Of all rapacious animals, man is the most universal destroyer". Vegetarianism was a way for people to return to nature with a more respectful and inclusive approach to the natural world. In Animal Food, Joseph Ritson concludes, "The only mode in which man or brute can be useful or happy, with respect either to the generality or to the individual, is to be just, mild, merciful, benevolent, humane, or, at least, innocent or harmless, whether such qualities are natural or not".

As concluded by Morton, "Vegetarianism was many things during the Romantic Period: a cutting edge of bourgeois consumer style; a thread of continuity from the religious radicalism of the seventeenth century; a logical extension of Enlightenment discourse on the rights of women and men". The modern vegetarian movement follows much of the same discourse.

== Late Romantic contemporaries of vegetarianism ==
=== Thomas Tryon ===
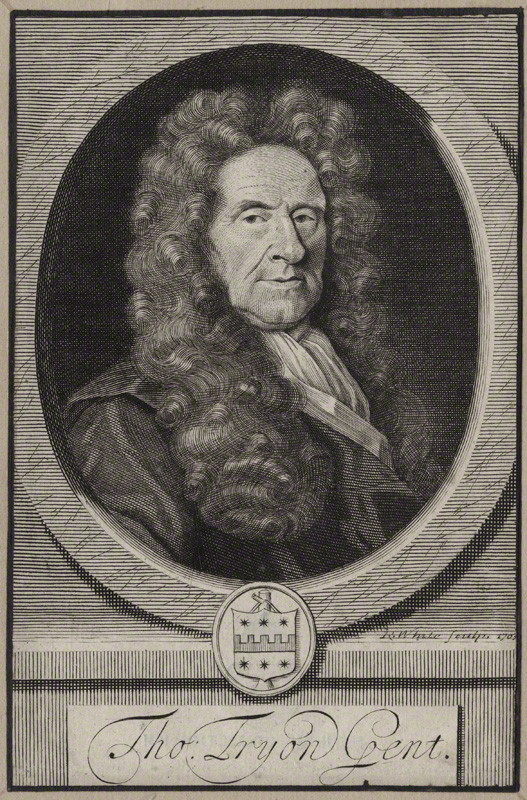
Engraved portrait of Thomas Tryon

Thomas Tryon (1634–1703), an English merchant and author, was one of the earliest supporters of vegetarianism. He established a connection between carnivorous eating habits and slavery, claiming both were immoral and inhumane. He argued that the eating of flesh was never for necessity, but rather a means for man to satisfy his hunger for dominance. According to Tryon, the killing and consumption of animals is nothing but an assertion of power over innocent, defenseless animals.

=== Alexander Pope ===
Alexander Pope (1688–1744) was another literary influence on the practice of vegetarianism. In The Guardian, Pope's essay, "Against Barbarity to Animals", paints a gruesome picture of animal slaughter. He writes, "I know nothing more shocking or horrid than the prospect of one of their [the humans'] kitchens covered with blood, and filled with the cries of creatures expiring in tortures". Pope viewed the slaughter of animals as an exercise of tyranny. Like Tryon, Pope believed animal consumption was the product of man's desire for dominion over all those inferior. He too put considerable blame on Enlightenment influences of politics, profit, and industrialization and he advocated in favor of vegetarianism as a means of rebelling against such tyrannical urges.

=== Joseph Ritson ===
Joseph Ritson (1752–1803), an English antiquary, was a radical vegetarian. Besides his arguments on physiognomy and anthropology in relation to a pro-vegetarian lifestyle, he also saw vegetarianism as a means of preventing medical ailments, advocating vegetarianism as a means of living to a "green old age". In his An Essay on Abstinence from Animal Food, as a Moral Duty, he argued that the a complete abstinence from meat consumption would cure any human disease or medical ailment. He also argued that the practice of consuming your "fellow creatures" was cruel and unnecessary. He emphasized the unfeeling emotions associated with animal slaughter and the resulting disconnect from nature that it caused. A pursuer of Romantic ideals and aesthetics of nature, Ritson classified the hunting and killing of animals as pure "blood sport", an act that demoted humans to a savage and diabolical existence. He argued that the pursuance of this "sport" only further corrupted humans' natural temper and turned one away from the appreciation of the sublimity of nature.

=== Percy Bysshe Shelley ===
Percy Bysshe Shelley (1792–1822) aligned most of his views on vegetarianism with those of Ritson. Like Ritson, Shelley believed that a meatless diet was the best mode of consumption for a healthy, disease-free life. He believed that human disease could be alleviated by a simple reversion back to a plant-based diet. The eating of meat, to Shelley, was a practice that polluted the body with syphilis, among other unpleasant ailments. In A Vindication of Natural Diet he wrote, "Should ever a physician be born with the genius of Locke, I am persuaded that he might trace all bodily and mental derangements to our unnatural habits", these unnatural habits being the consumption of meat. He compared the negative effects of a meat-based diet to alcoholism, asking, "How many thousands have become murderers and robbers, bigots and domestic tyrants, dissolute and abandoned adventurers, from the use of fermented liquors?". He goes on to suggest that, a human of gentle disposition towards animals, "rising from a meal of roots", will be a healthy man whose only threat of death will be that of his own natural, old age.

== See also ==
- Vegetarianism in the Victorian era

== Bibliography ==
- Berlin, Isaiah, "The Counter Enlightenment" in The Proper Study of Mankind: An Anthology of Essays.
- Buffon, Georges-Louis Leclerc Comte de, Histoire naturelle; Vol. 4, pp. 382.
- Kenyon-Jones, Christine, Kindred Brutes: Animals in Romantic-Period Writing; UK: Ashgate Publishing. 2001.
- Morton, Timothy, Cultures of Taste/Theories of Appetite: Eating Romanticism; New York: Palgrave Macmillan. 2004.
- Morton, Timothy, "Joseph Ritson, Percy Shelley and the Making of Romantic Vegetarianism", Romanticism. Vol. 12, Issue 1. pp. 52–61. 2006.
- Ritson, Joseph, "An Essay on Abstinence from Animal Food, as a Moral Duty", edited by Sir Richard Philips; London, 1802, (Kessinger Publishing 2009).
- Pope, Alexander, "Against Barbarity to Animals", The Guardian, No. 61. 1713.
- Preece, Rod, Sins of the Flesh: A History of Ethical Vegetarian Thought; Vancouver; Toronto: UBC Press. 2008.
- Shelley, Percy Bysshe, "A Vindication of Natural Diet;" London: Smith & Davy. 1813, pp 1–36.
- Spencer, Colin, The Heretic's Feast: A History of Vegetarianism; Great Britain: Hartnolls Ltd, Bodmin. 1993.
- Stuart, Tristram, The Bloodless Revolution: A Cultural History of Vegetarianism from 1600 to Modern Times; Great Britain: HarperPress. 2006.
