= Bibliography of veganism and vegetarianism =

The following is a bibliography of veganism and vegetarianism. This bibliography includes primary, secondary, and tertiary sources addressing the historical development, ethical foundations, health considerations, environmental impact, and cultural significance of vegan and vegetarian diets. Works listed may explore the philosophical and religious roots of abstaining from animal products, advocacy for animal rights and welfare, and the social movements associated with vegan and vegetarian lifestyles. Sources are drawn from a variety of academic disciplines, as well as popular and activist literature.

== Reference works ==
- Dyer, Judith C. (1982). Vegetarianism: An Annotated Bibliography. Garland Publishing. ISBN 978-0-8108-1532-2.
- Puskar-Pasewicz, Margaret, ed. (2010). Cultural Encyclopedia of Vegetarianism. Greenwood. ISBN 978-0-313-37556-9.
- Newton, David E. (2019-06-24). Vegetarianism and Veganism: A Reference Handbook. Bloomsbury Academic. ISBN 978-1-4408-6763-7.
- Shurtleff, William; Aoyagi, Akiko, eds. (2022-03-10). History of Vegetarianism and Veganism Worldwide (1970-2022): Extensively Annotated Bibliography and Sourcebook. Soyinfo Center. ISBN 978-1-948436-74-8.

== History ==
=== Articles ===
- Davis, John. "The Origins of the 'Vegetarians'". International Vegetarian Union.
- Davis, John. "Extracts from some journals 1842–48 – the earliest known uses of the word 'vegetarian'". International Vegetarian Union.
- Whorton, James C. (May 1994). "Historical development of vegetarianism". The American Journal of Clinical Nutrition. 39 (5): 1103S–1109S. doi:10.1093/ajcn/59.5.1103S. PMID 8172109.
- Laws, Rita (September 1994). "Native Americans and vegetarianism" (PDF). Vegetarian Journal. The Vegetarian Resource Group.
- Guerrini, Anita (1999). "A Diet for a Sensitive Soul: Vegetarianism in Eighteenth-Century Britain". Eighteenth-Century Life. 23 (2): 34–42. ISSN 1086-3192.
- Leneman, Leah (1999). "No Animal Food: The Road to Veganism in Britain, 1909-1944" (PDF). Society & Animals. 7 (3): 219–228. doi:10.1163/156853099X00095. ISSN 1568-5306.
- Rudrum, Alan (March 2003). "Ethical Vegetarianism in Seventeenth-Century Britain: Its Roots in Sixteenth-Century European Theological Debate". The Seventeenth Century. 18 (1): 76–92. doi:10.1080/0268117X.2003.10555520. ISSN 0268-117X.
- Leneman, Leah (1997-06-01). "The Awakened Instinct: Vegetarianism and the Women's Suffrage Movement in Britain". Women's History Review. 6 (2): 271–287. doi:10.1080/09612029700200144. ISSN 0961-2025.
- Shapin, Steven (2007-01-22). "The history of vegetarianism" (PDF). The New Yorker.
- Schneider, Nathan (2010). "A History of Vegetarianism". Candid Hominid.
- Davis, John (2011-05-25). "Veganism from 1806". International Vegetarian Union.
- Schneider, Nathan (July 2011) [2010]. "A History of Veganism". Candid Hominid.
- Davis, John (2011-07-27). "The Truth Tester 1846-48 - a vegan journal". International Vegetarian Union.
- Davis, John (2011-10-26). "London Vegetarian Association, 1850s - the world's first 'vegan society'". International Vegetarian Union.
- Yeh, Hsin-Yi (April 2013). "Boundaries, Entities, and Modern Vegetarianism: Examining the Emergence of the First Vegetarian Organization". Qualitative Inquiry. 19 (4): 298–309. doi:10.1177/1077800412471516. ISSN 1077-8004.
- Jones, Michael Owen (May–August 2016). "In Pursuit of Percy Shelley, 'The First Celebrity Vegan': An Essay on Meat, Sex, and Broccoli". Journal of Folklore Research. 53 (2): 1. doi:10.2979/jfolkrese.53.2.01.
- Davis, John (September 2016). "The Origins of the Vegans: 1944-46" (PDF). International Vegetarian Union.
- Richardson, Elsa (Spring 2019). "Man Is Not a Meat-Eating Animal: Vegetarians and Evolution in Late-Victorian Britain" (PDF). Victorian Review. 45 (1): 117–134. doi:10.1353/vcr.2019.0034.
- Young, Liam (Spring 2019). "Newman's Conversion: Francis William Newman and Vegetarianism on the Instalment Plan". Victorian Periodicals Review. 52 (1): 166–200. doi:10.1353/vpr.2019.0007.
- Richardson, Elsa (2021). "Cranks, Clerks, and Suffragettes: The Vegetarian Restaurant in British Culture and Fiction 1880–1914" (PDF). Literature and Medicine. 39 (1): 133–153. doi:10.1353/lm.2021.0010. ISSN 1080-6571. PMID 34176815.
- McIlwain, Richard (April 2024) [2022]. "Vegetarian Society: The First 175 Years". Vegetarian Society.
- Malitska, Julia (2022-07-03). "Mediated Vegetarianism: The Periodical Press and New Associations in the Late Russian Empire". Media History. 28 (3): 315–336. doi:10.1080/13688804.2021.1937972. ISSN 1368-8804.
- Kim, Haejoo (2021-11-09). "Vegetarian Evolution in Nineteenth-Century Britain". Journal of Victorian Culture. 26 (4): 519–533. doi:10.1093/jvcult/vcab040. ISSN 1355-5502.
- Richardson, Elsa (2021-11-22). "Lentils Beyond the Veil: Spiritualism, Vegetarianism and Dietetics" (PDF). Aries. 22 (1): 136–154. doi:10.1163/15700593-02201007. ISSN 1567-9896.

=== Books ===
==== Historical ====
- Williams, Howard (1883). The Ethics of Diet. London: F. Pitman.
- Forward, Charles W. (1898). Fifty Years of Food Reform: A History of the Vegetarian Movement in England. London: The Ideal Publishing Union.

==== Modern ====
- Yager, Jan (1975). The Vegetable Passion: A History of the Vegetarian State of Mind. Charles Scribner's Sons. ISBN 978-0-684-13925-8.
- Spencer, Colin (1993). The Heretic's Feast: A History of Vegetarianism. Fourth Estate. ISBN 978-0-87451-760-6.
- Gregerson, Jon (1994). Vegetarianism: A History. Jain Publishing Company. ISBN 978-0-87573-030-1.
- Walters, Kerry S.; Portmess, Lisa, eds. (1999). Ethical Vegetarianism: From Pythagoras to Peter Singer. SUNY Press. ISBN 978-0-7914-4044-5.
- Spencer, Colin (2000). Vegetarianism: A History. Grub Street. ISBN 978-1-902304-58-8.
- Iacobbo, Karen; Iacobbo, Michael (2004). Vegetarian America: A History. Praeger. ISBN 978-0-275-97519-7.
- Stuart, Tristram (2006). The Bloodless Revolution: Radical Vegetarianism and the Discovery of India. HarperCollins. ISBN 978-0-00-712892-1.
- Gregory, James (2007). Of Victorians and Vegetarians. I.B. Tauris. ISBN 978-0-85771-526-5.
- Preece, Rod (July 2009). Sins of the Flesh: A History of Ethical Vegetarian Thought. UBC Press. ISBN 978-0-7748-5849-6.
- Alsdorf, Ludwig (2010). The History of Vegetarianism and Cow-Veneration in India. Routledge. doi:10.4324/9780203859599. ISBN 978-1-135-16641-0.
- Alsdorf, Ludwig (2010-02-25). The History of Vegetarianism and Cow-Veneration in India. Routledge. doi:10.4324/9780203859599. ISBN 978-1-135-16641-0.
- Davis, John. World Veganism - past, present and future (PDF). International Vegetarian Union.
- Shprintzen, Adam D. (2013). The Vegetarian Crusade: The Rise of an American Reform Movement, 1817–1921. University of North Carolina Press. ISBN 978-1-4696-0892-1.
- Larue, Renan (2015). Le végétarisme et ses ennemis: Vingt-cinq siècles de débats [Vegetarianism and Its Enemies: Twenty-Five Centuries of Debate] (in French). Presses Universitaires de France. ISBN 978-2-13-061903-1.
- Hauser, Jessica (2023). A Taste for Purity: An Entangled History of Vegetarianism. Columbia University Press. doi:10.7312/haus20752-004.
- Muratori, Cecilia (2023-01-09). Renaissance Vegetarianism: The Philosophical Afterlives of Porphyry's On Abstinence. Modern Humanities Research Assoc. ISBN 978-1-78188-341-9.
- Savvas, Theophilus (2024-04-30). Vegetarianism and Veganism in Literature from the Ancients to the Twenty-First Century. Cambridge University Press. doi:10.1017/9781009287265. ISBN 978-1-009-28726-5.
- Kubisz, Marzena (2024-08-14). Children's Vegetarian Culture in the Victorian Era: The Juvenile Food Reformers Press and Literary Change (1st ed.). London: Routledge. doi:10.4324/9781003400042. ISBN 978-1-003-40004-2.

===== Chapters =====
- Amato, Paul R.; Partridge, Sonia A. (1989). "The Origins of Modern Vegetarianism". The New Vegetarians: Promoting Health and Protecting Life. Springer. pp. 1–29. doi:10.1007/978-1-4899-6004-7_1. ISBN 978-0-306-43121-0.
- Nesvet, Rebecca (2022). "Vegetarianism". In Scholl, Lesa; Morris, Emily (eds.). The Palgrave Encyclopedia of Victorian Women's Writing. Cham: Springer International Publishing. pp. 1649–1654. doi:10.1007/978-3-030-78318-1_293. ISBN 978-3-030-78317-4.
- Young, Liam (2022). "Vegetarian Messenger, The". In Scholl, Lesa; Morris, Emily (eds.). The Palgrave Encyclopedia of Victorian Women's Writing. Cham: Springer International Publishing. pp. 1641–1649. doi:10.1007/978-3-030-78318-1_436. ISBN 978-3-030-78317-4.
- Young, Liam (2022). "Women's Vegetarian Union, The". In Scholl, Lesa; Morris, Emily (eds.). The Palgrave Encyclopedia of Victorian Women's Writing. Cham: Springer International Publishing. pp. 1713–1715. doi:10.1007/978-3-030-78318-1_437. ISBN 978-3-030-78317-4.

=== Theses ===
- Twigg, Julia (Autumn 1981). The Vegetarian Movement in England, 1847–1981: A Study in the Structure of Its Ideology (PhD thesis). London School of Economics.
- Regan, Marguerite Marie (August 2001). The Roasting of John Bull: Vegetarian Protest in Eighteenth-Century English Literature (PhD). University of Arkansas.
- Gregory, James Richard Thomas Elliott (2002). The Vegetarian Movement in Britain c.1840–1901: A Study of Its Development, Personnel and Wider Connections (PhD thesis). University of Southampton.
- Samples, Suzanne (2013-07-19). Disorderly Eating in Victorian England (PDF) (PhD thesis). Auburn University. Archived from the original (PDF) on 2024-07-09.
- Young, Liam (2017). Eating Serials: Pastoral Power, Print Media, and the Vegetarian Society in England, 1847–1897 (PhD thesis). University of Alberta. doi:10.7939/R3JD4Q54B.
- Barrs, Sean (December 2024). The Romantic Vegetable Eaters: The Politics and Poetics of an Active Diet (PhD thesis). Anglia Ruskin University.

== Ethics ==
=== Articles ===
- Doggett, Tyler (2023). "Moral Vegetarianism". In Zalta, Edward N. (ed.). Stanford Encyclopedia of Philosophy. ISSN 1095-5054. OCLC 429049174.

=== Historical ===
- Porphyry (200s). On Abstinence from Eating Animals.
- Mandeville, Bernard (1714). The Fable of the Bees. London.
- Morris, Robert (1746). A Reasonable Plea for the Animal Creation. London: M. Cooper.
- Remarks on Cruelty to Animals. London: G. Nicholson and Co. 1795.
- Oswald, John (1791). The Cry of Nature; or, An Appeal to Mercy and to Justice, on Behalf of the Persecuted Animals. London: J. Johnson.
- Ritson, Joseph (1802). An Essay on Abstinence from Animal Food, as a Moral Duty. London: Richard Phillips.

=== Modern ===
- Linzey, Andrew; Linzey, Clair, eds. (2018-10-25). Ethical Vegetarianism and Veganism. Routledge. ISBN 978-0-429-95581-5.
- Huemer, Michael (2019-03-27). Dialogues on Ethical Vegetarianism. Routledge. ISBN 978-0-429-63800-8.

== Religion ==
=== General works ===
- Walters, Kerry S.; Portmess, Lisa, eds. (2001). Religious Vegetarianism: From Hesiod to the Dalai Lama. SUNY Press. ISBN 978-0-7914-4972-1.

=== Buddhist vegetarianism ===
- Balsys, Bodo (2004). Ahimsā: Buddhism and the Vegetarian Ideal. Munshiram Manoharlal Publishers. ISBN 978-81-215-1102-5.
- Stewart, James (2015-08-14). Vegetarianism and Animal Ethics in Contemporary Buddhism. Routledge. ISBN 978-1-317-62398-4.
- Barstow, Geoffrey (2019-10-01). The Faults of Meat: Tibetan Buddhist Writings on Vegetarianism. Simon and Schuster. ISBN 978-1-61429-505-1.

=== Christian vegetarianism ===
==== Books ====
- Grumett, David; Muers, Rachel (2011-11-03). Eating and Believing: Interdisciplinary Perspectives on Vegetarianism and Theology. A&C Black. ISBN 978-0-567-57736-8.
- Young, Richard Alan (2012-03-30). Is God a Vegetarian?: Christianity, Vegetarianism, and Animal Rights. Open Court. ISBN 978-0-8126-9820-6.

==== Theses ====
- Calvert, Samantha Jane (June 2012). Eden's Diet: Christianity and Vegetarianism 1809–2009 (PDF) (PhD thesis). University of Birmingham. p. 203.

=== Jewish vegetarianism ===
- Schwartz, Richard H. (2001). Judaism and Vegetarianism. Lantern Books. ISBN 978-1-930051-24-9.

== Nutrition ==
=== Articles ===
- Palaniswamy, U. R. (2003). "Vegetarianism and human health". HortTechnology. 13 (2): 243–251. doi:10.21273/HORTTECH.13.2.0243.
- Leitzmann, Claus (2014). "Vegetarian nutrition: past, present, future". The American Journal of Clinical Nutrition. 100 (1): 496S–502S. doi:10.3945/ajcn.113.071365. PMID 24898226.
- Jun Wang, Xiang; Qiang Jiang, Chao; Sen Zhang, Wei; Zhu, Feng; Li Jin, Ya; Woo, Jean; Keung Cheng, Kar; Hing Lam, Tai; Xu, Lin (2020). "Milk consumption and risk of mortality from all-cause, cardiovascular disease and cancer in older people". Clinical Nutrition. 39 (11): 3442–3451. doi:10.1016/j.clnu.2020.03.003. PMID 32229169.

=== Books ===
- Sabate, Joan (2001-03-21). Vegetarian Nutrition. CRC Press. ISBN 978-1-4200-3683-1.
- Carlson, Peggy (2009). The Complete Vegetarian: The Essential Guide to Good Health. University of Illinois Press. ISBN 978-0-252-07506-3.

=== Systematic reviews ===
- Kwok, Chi Shing; Umar, Saad; Myint, Phyo Kyaw; Mamas, Mamas A.; Loke, Yoon K. (2014). "Vegetarian diet, Seventh Day Adventists and risk of cardiovascular mortality: A systematic review and meta-analysis". International Journal of Cardiology. 176 (3): 680–686. doi:10.1016/j.ijcard.2014.07.080. PMID 25149402.
- Wang, Fenglei; Nguyen, Viet T.; Hu, Ying; Fung, Teresa T.; Willett, Walter C.; Hu, Frank B.; Zhang, Chenchen (2015). "Effects of Vegetarian Diets on Blood Lipids: A Systematic Review and Meta-Analysis of Randomized Controlled Trials". Journal of the American Heart Association. 4 (10) e002408. doi:10.1161/JAHA.115.002408. PMC 4845138. PMID 26508743.
- Iguacel, Isabel; Miguel-Berges, María L.; Gómez-Bruton, Alejandro; Moreno, Luis A.; Julián, Cristina (2019). "Veganism, vegetarianism, bone mineral density, and fracture risk: a systematic review and meta-analysis". Nutrition Reviews. 77 (1): 1–18. doi:10.1093/nutrit/nuy045. PMID 30376075.
- Picasso, Maria C.; Tagliabue, Anna; Vinci, Roberta; Curti, Maria; Pasini, Walter; Catellani, Carla; Franchi, Eleonora; Battezzati, Alessandro (2019). "Effect of vegetarian diets on the presentation of metabolic syndrome or its components: A systematic review and meta-analysis". Clinical Nutrition. 38 (3): 1117–1132. doi:10.1016/j.clnu.2018.05.021. PMID 29907356.
- Smits, Kirsten P. J.; Kolossa, Kerstin; Brandt, Markus; Schmalz, Gritt; Schulz-Weidner, Nina (2019). "Vegetarian diet and its possible influence on dental health: A systematic literature review". Community Dentistry and Oral Epidemiology. 48 (1): 7–13. doi:10.1111/cdoe.12498. PMC 6972589. PMID 31571246.
- Viguiliouk, Effie; Stevenson, Chris E.; Guenette, Jordan A.; Chiavaroli, Laura; Kendall, Cyril W. C.; Severi, Christina; Paquette, Mariane; Sievenpiper, John L. (2019). "Effect of vegetarian dietary patterns on cardiometabolic risk factors in diabetes: A systematic review and meta-analysis of randomized controlled trials". Clinical Nutrition. 38 (3): 1133–1145. doi:10.1016/j.clnu.2018.05.032. PMID 29960809.
- Iguacel, Isabel; Huybrechts, Inge; Moreno, Luis A.; Michels, Nathalie (2021-03-09). "Vegetarianism and veganism compared with mental health and cognitive outcomes: a systematic review and meta-analysis". Nutrition Reviews. 79 (4): 361–381. doi:10.1093/nutrit/nuaa030. ISSN 1753-4887. PMID 32483598.
- Salehi, Gelareh; Díaz, Estela; Redondo, Raquel (2023-05-01). "Forty-five years of research on vegetarianism and veganism: A systematic and comprehensive literature review of quantitative studies". Heliyon. 9 (5) e16091. Bibcode:2023Heliy...916091S. doi:10.1016/j.heliyon.2023.e16091. ISSN 2405-8440. PMC 10200863. PMID 37223710.

=== Umbrella reviews ===
- Oussalah, Abderrahim; Levy, Julien; Berthezène, Clémence; Alpers, David H.; Guéant, Jean-Louis (November 2020). "Health outcomes associated with vegetarian diets: An umbrella review of systematic reviews and meta-analyses". Clinical Nutrition (Edinburgh, Scotland). 39 (11): 3283–3307. doi:10.1016/j.clnu.2020.02.037. ISSN 1532-1983. PMID 32204974.

== Cuisine ==
=== Historical ===
- Evelyn, John (1699). Acetaria: A Discourse of Sallets. London: B. Tooke.
- Primitive Cookery. London: J. Williams. 1767.
- Brotherton, Martha (1812). Vegetable Cookery.
- Nichols, T. L. (1888). Dr. Nichols' Penny Vegetarian Cookery. London: Franks & Co.

=== Modern ===
- Madison, Deborah (1997). Vegetarian Cooking for Everyone. Broadway Books. ISBN 978-0-7679-0014-0.
- Ingram, Christine; Denny, Roz (1997). The Complete Encyclopedia of Vegetables and Vegetarian Cooking. Hermes House. ISBN 978-1-901289-03-9.
- Payany, Esterelle (2019-03-05). Encyclopedia of Vegetarian Cuisine. Rizzoli. ISBN 978-2-08-020394-6.

== Cultural and theoretical perspectives ==
=== General works ===
==== Articles ====
- Ruby, Matthew B. (2012). "Vegetarianism: A blossoming field of study" (PDF). Appetite. 58 (1): 141–150. doi:10.1016/j.appet.2011.09.019. PMID 22001025.

==== Books ====
- Hanganu-Bresch, Cristina; Kondrlik, Kristin (2020-12-12). Veg(etari)an Arguments in Culture, History, and Practice: The V Word. Springer Nature. ISBN 978-3-030-53280-2.

=== Feminism and critical theory ===
- Adams, Carol J. (1990). The Sexual Politics of Meat: A Feminist-Vegetarian Critical Theory. Continuum. ISBN 978-0-8264-1184-6.
- Oliver, Catherine (2021-08-12). Veganism, Archives, and Animals: Geographies of a Multispecies World. Routledge. ISBN 978-1-000-42454-6.

=== Vegan studies ===
- Wright, Laura (2015). The Vegan Studies Project: Food, Animals, and Gender in the Age of Terror. Foreword by Carol J. Adams. University of Georgia Press. ISBN 978-0-8203-4856-8.
- Castricano, Jodey; Simonsen, Rasmus R. (2016-09-13). Critical Perspectives on Veganism. Springer. ISBN 978-3-319-33419-6.
- Quinn, Emelia; Westwood, Benjamin (2018-05-24). Thinking Veganism in Literature and Culture: Towards a Vegan Theory. Springer. ISBN 978-3-319-73380-7.
- Griffin, Nathan Stephens (2018-08-01). Understanding Veganism: Biography and Identity. Springer International Publishing. ISBN 978-3-319-84820-4.
- Wright, Laura, ed. (2019-02-20). Through a Vegan Studies Lens: Textual Ethics and Lived Activism. University of Nevada Press. ISBN 978-1-948908-11-5.
- Wright, Laura, ed. (2021-03-30). The Routledge Handbook of Vegan Studies. Routledge. ISBN 978-1-000-36458-3.

== See also ==
- List of vegan and plant-based media
- History of vegetarianism
- Bibliography of animal rights
