= The Cry of Nature; or, An Appeal to Mercy and to Justice, on Behalf of the Persecuted Animals =

1791 book by John Oswald

The Cry of Nature
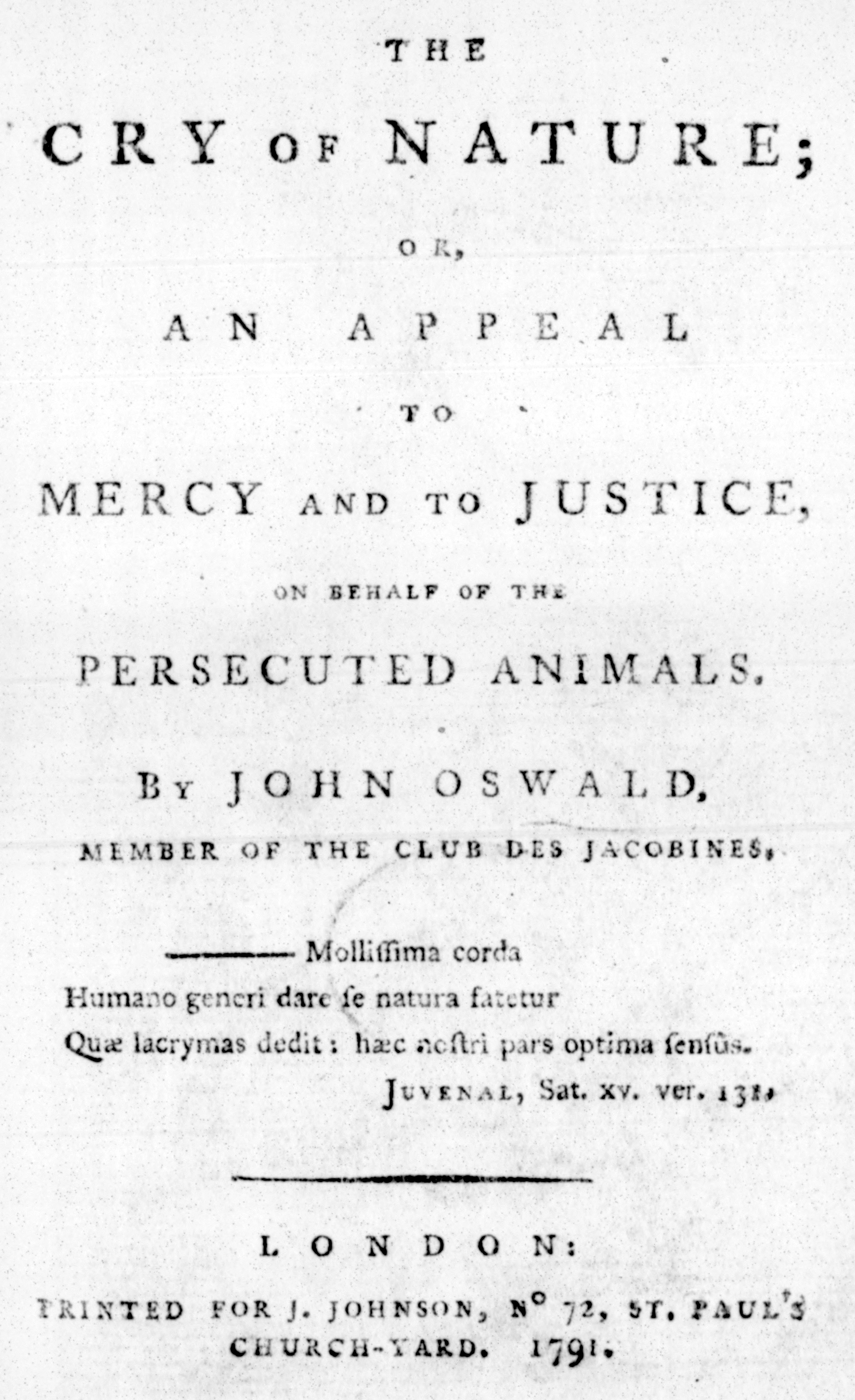
- First edition title page
- Author: John Oswald
- Illustrator: James Gillray (frontispiece)
- Language: English
- Subjects: Ethical vegetarianism; animal ethics
- Genre: Treatise
- Publisher: J. Johnson
- Publication date: 22 June 1791
- Publication place: Kingdom of Great Britain
- Media type: Print
- Pages: 156
- OCLC: 65318929
- Text: The Cry of Nature at Wikisource

The Cry of Nature; or, An Appeal to Mercy and to Justice, on Behalf of the Persecuted Animals is a 1791 treatise by the Scottish writer and revolutionary John Oswald. Published in London by J. Johnson, it argues for ethical vegetarianism and condemns meat-eating, hunting, vivisection, and animal sacrifice. The first edition included a frontispiece by James Gillray.

Oswald presents animals as sentient beings entitled to sympathy and justice, and argues that cruelty towards them damages human morality. He draws on classical, biblical, and Asian sources, including Porphyry's De abstinentia and accounts of Hindu practice. Scholars have examined the book in relation to Rousseauian political thought, Indian vegetarianism, and eighteenth-century debates about animals. The anonymous 1795 tract Remarks on Cruelty to Animals, printed by George Nicholson, used material from Oswald's work.

== Background ==
John Oswald (c. 1760–1793) was a Scottish poet, soldier, political journalist, and revolutionary active in Britain and France. He served in the British Army in India, where he encountered Hindu vegetarian practices, and later adopted vegetarianism. After returning to Britain, he worked in radical political journalism before moving to Paris in the early 1790s. There he joined the Jacobin Club and the Cercle social, advocated a democratic republic based on direct participation, and organised a regiment of volunteer pikemen. He was killed in 1793 during fighting in the War in the Vendée.

Oswald's experience in India informed his discussion of Hindu vegetarianism in The Cry of Nature.

== Publication history ==
The Cry of Nature was first published in London by J. Johnson on 22 June 1791. It was reprinted in 2000 as the fourth volume of Aaron Garrett's series Animal Rights and Souls in the Eighteenth Century.

A separate edition edited by John Hribal, with a preface by Peter Linebaugh, was published by the Edwin Mellen Press in 2000.

== Summary ==
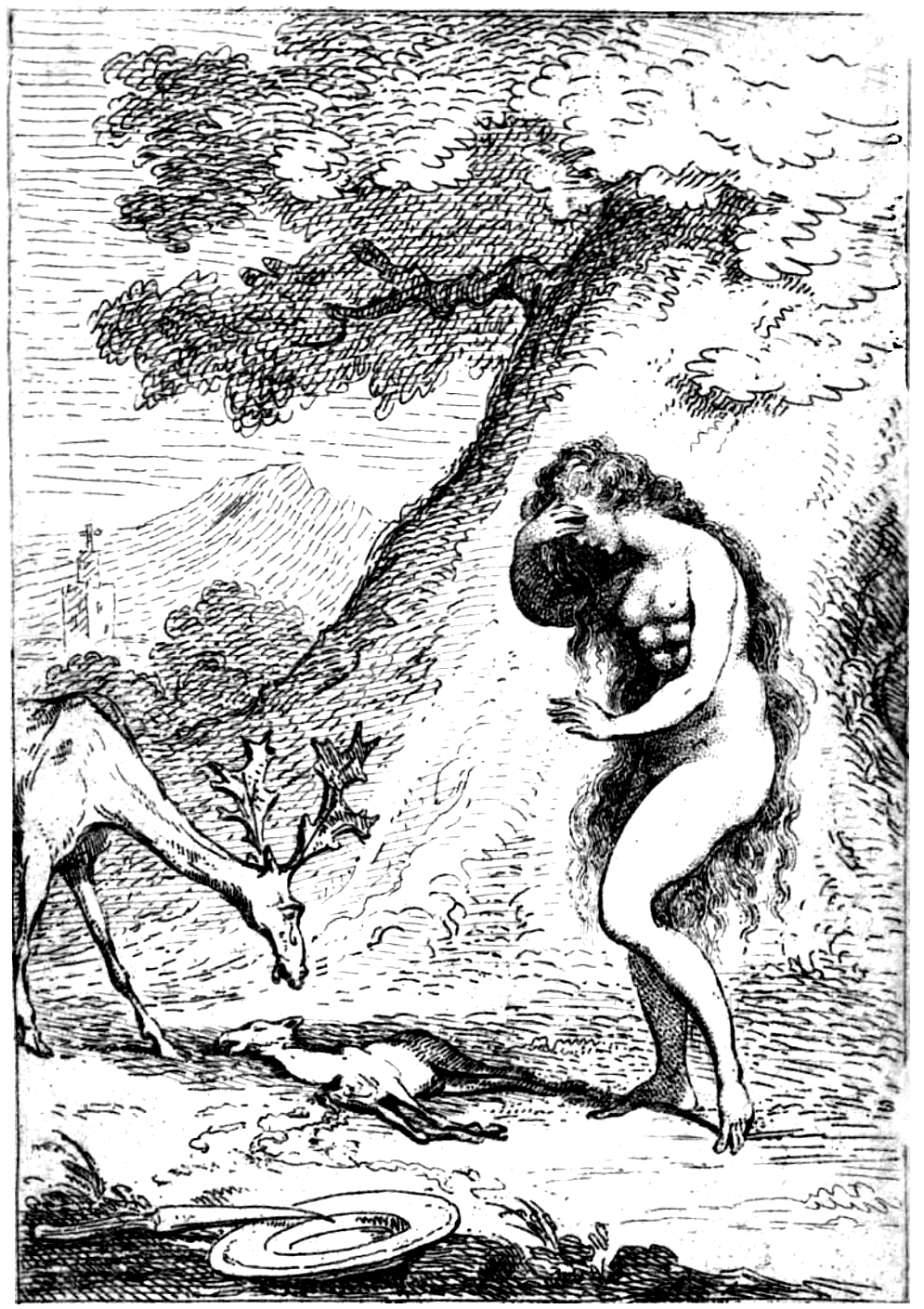
Frontispiece of The Cry of Nature. The caption reads: "The butcher's knife hath laid low the delight of a fond dam, & the darling of Nature is now stretched in gore upon the ground."

Oswald argues that humans are not naturally carnivorous and that meat-eating is maintained by custom, religious teaching, and social convention. He contends that killing animals accustoms people to cruelty and violence. The division of labour, in his account, separates consumers from slaughter and allows them to eat meat without witnessing the killing of animals.

The treatise describes animals as capable of affection, intelligence, grief, and social behaviour. Oswald rejects the belief that they were created for human domination and argues that their capacity for suffering makes them proper objects of compassion.

Oswald contrasts European treatment of animals with practices attributed to Hindustan, where he says religion and law protect animals from violence. He also refers to Pythagorean and early Christian abstention from animal flesh. His authorities include Porphyry, Plutarch, Epicurus, Juvenal, Virgil, Ovid, Homer, Shakespeare, and James Thomson. He discusses Augustine's De moribus Manichaeorum and De quantitate animae in connection with the denial of reason and moral standing to animals.

Biblical passages are used both in support of and against dietary arguments. Oswald cites Genesis 1:29 favourably, but criticises interpretations of Genesis 9 that permit the killing of animals. He also refers to the physicians George Cheyne and John Arbuthnot in support of his claim that animal food is unhealthy and unsuited to the human body.

Oswald presents animal sacrifice as a stage in the development of meat-eating. In his account, early religious offerings consisted of plants, while animals were first killed during periods of fear, famine, or attempts to appease hostile deities. He argues that repeated sacrifice weakened the initial aversion to slaughter, and that priests subsequently authorised the eating of sacrificial victims. Drawing on Greek, Roman, biblical, and other traditions, he describes ritual ceremony as a means of presenting the animal as consenting to its death and of concealing the injustice of the act.

The book describes an original human condition based on agriculture, peace, and a vegetable diet, followed by a decline into warfare and the exploitation of animals. It ends with an appeal to extend sympathy to all sentient beings.

== Scholarly analysis ==
Aaron Garrett describes The Cry of Nature as an attack on meat-eating, vivisection, and violence against animals. In his account, Oswald treated cruelty and claims of human superiority as consequences of estrangement from nature. Garrett relates this argument to a radical form of Rousseauian history in which peaceful relations between humans and animals were displaced by religious doctrine, custom, and the delegation of killing. He also notes Oswald's use of examples from India, China, and Tibet.

John Grey and Garrett read the treatise as combining Rousseau's criticism of commercial society with arguments drawn from Indian vegetarianism, Porphyry, Buddhist and Hindu texts, and the Quran. They state that Oswald regarded meat-eating and animal experiments as forms of estrangement from pity, and that the concealment of slaughter enabled consumers to remain detached from cruelty. They also connect his vegetarianism with his support for an egalitarian democratic society.

== Later use and discussion ==
The anonymous tract Remarks on Cruelty to Animals, printed by George Nicholson in 1795, drew on The Cry of Nature. Karen Attar writes that it combined Oswald's arguments with historical, religious, and scientific material in support of vegetarianism, and repeated his criticism of the separation between consumers and slaughter.

Stephen F. Eisenman took the title of his 2013 book The Cry of Nature: Art and the Making of Animal Rights from Oswald's treatise. In a review of Eisenman's book, Sarah R. Cohen writes that Oswald rejected human dominion over animals and treated them as moral subjects. She describes Eisenman's use of this argument in his discussion of artworks depicting animal suffering and opposition to anthropocentrism.

Indira Nathan, Frances Robinson, Lynne Burgess, and Allan Hackett place the book among eighteenth-century works opposing vivisection and within the history of vegetarian and humanist thought.

== See also ==
- History of animal rights
- History of vegetarianism
- Vegetarianism in the Romantic era
- Anti-vivisection movement
- Ethics of eating meat
- Bibliography of veganism and vegetarianism
