= Ralph Fletcher (surgeon) =

English surgeon and writer (1780–1851)

- Born: 1780; Gloucester, England
- Died: 8 February 1851 (aged 70–71); Gloucester, England
- Resting place: St Mary de Crypt Church, Gloucester
- Education: University of Edinburgh Medical School
- Occupations: Surgeon; writer; civic figure
- Notable work: Sketches from the Case Book (1833); A Few Notes on Cruelty to Animals (1846)
- Title: Mayor of Gloucester
- Term: 1818–1819; 1828–1829
- Spouse: Elizabeth Owen (m. 1805)
- Children: 4

Ralph Fletcher (1780 – 8 February 1851) was an English surgeon, medical and animal welfare writer, and civic figure. He served twice as Mayor of Gloucester and held senior roles at the Gloucester Infirmary and Gloucester Lunatic Asylum. An early advocate of animal welfare, he was President of the Society for the Prevention of Cruelty to Animals in Gloucester. He authored Sketches from the Case Book (1833), considered the first casebook of psychosomatic medicine, and A Few Notes on Cruelty to Animals (1846), an early work highlighting abuses against animals and calling for reform.

== Biography ==
=== Early life and education ===
Fletcher was born in Gloucester in 1780, the son of a baker. He was educated at St Bartholomew's Hospital and studied medicine at the Gloucester County Hospital under Charles Brandon Trye. He obtained his M.D. from the University of Edinburgh.

=== Medical career ===
Fletcher established his own medical practice in Barton Street, Gloucester. His reputation as a consulting physician attracted patients from across the county and from South Wales. In 1811, he became surgeon to the Gloucester Infirmary and to the Gloucester Lunatic Asylum. He was promoted to consultant surgeon at the infirmary in 1833.

In his writings, Fletcher identified a connection between emotional factors and the development or resolution of physical symptoms. In 1833, he published Sketches from the Case Book, now considered the first casebook in the field of psychosomatic medicine. The case studies described patients with symptoms attributed to emotional causes who recovered without surgical or pharmaceutical intervention. He described patients whose symptoms were psychosomatic and were cured without recourse to drugs or surgery.

=== Animal welfare ===
Fletcher was an advocate for animal welfare and was President of the Society for the Prevention of Cruelty to Animals in Gloucester.

In 1846, he authored an early work on animal welfare, A Few Notes on Cruelty to Animals. The book was inspired by his observations of mistreatment near his home on Barton Street, which was close to the town animal pound. The book described abuses including badger-baiting, cat mutilation, the beating of calves, overworked donkeys and dogs, and starvation of pigs. Fletcher proposed the creation of animal hospitals analogous to those for humans. It was positively reviewed in the London Medical Gazette, The Athenaeum and The Veterinary Record.

Fletcher commented that we should show respect for "the interest and feelings of every sentient being that holds life." Upon walking the streets of London, Fletcher would stop and look at poor jaded cab-horses and give a shilling to the cabman who was most attentive to his horses as a way of encouragement.

=== Political career ===
Fletcher was elected Mayor of Gloucester for the terms 1818–1819 and 1828–1829, and remained active in civic affairs throughout his life.

=== Personal life and death ===
Fletcher married Elizabeth Owen on 18 November 1805 at St. Michaels, Gloucester. They had four children.

Fletcher died on 8 February 1851. He was buried at St Mary de Crypt Church, Gloucester. He was an avid collector of paintings and artworks and left a will valued at less than £50,000 (equivalent to £5,775,790 in 2023). He bequeathed £15 (equivalent to £1,733 in 2023) per annum to support the cats he had fed when he was alive.

== Publications ==
- Medico-Chirurgical Notes and Illustrations (1831)
- Sketches from the Case Book: To Illustrate the Influence of the Mind on the Body (1833)
- A Few Notes on Cruelty to Animals: On the Inadequacy of Penal Law, on General Hospitals for Animals (1846)
