= A Few Notes on Cruelty to Animals =

1846 book by Ralph Fletcher

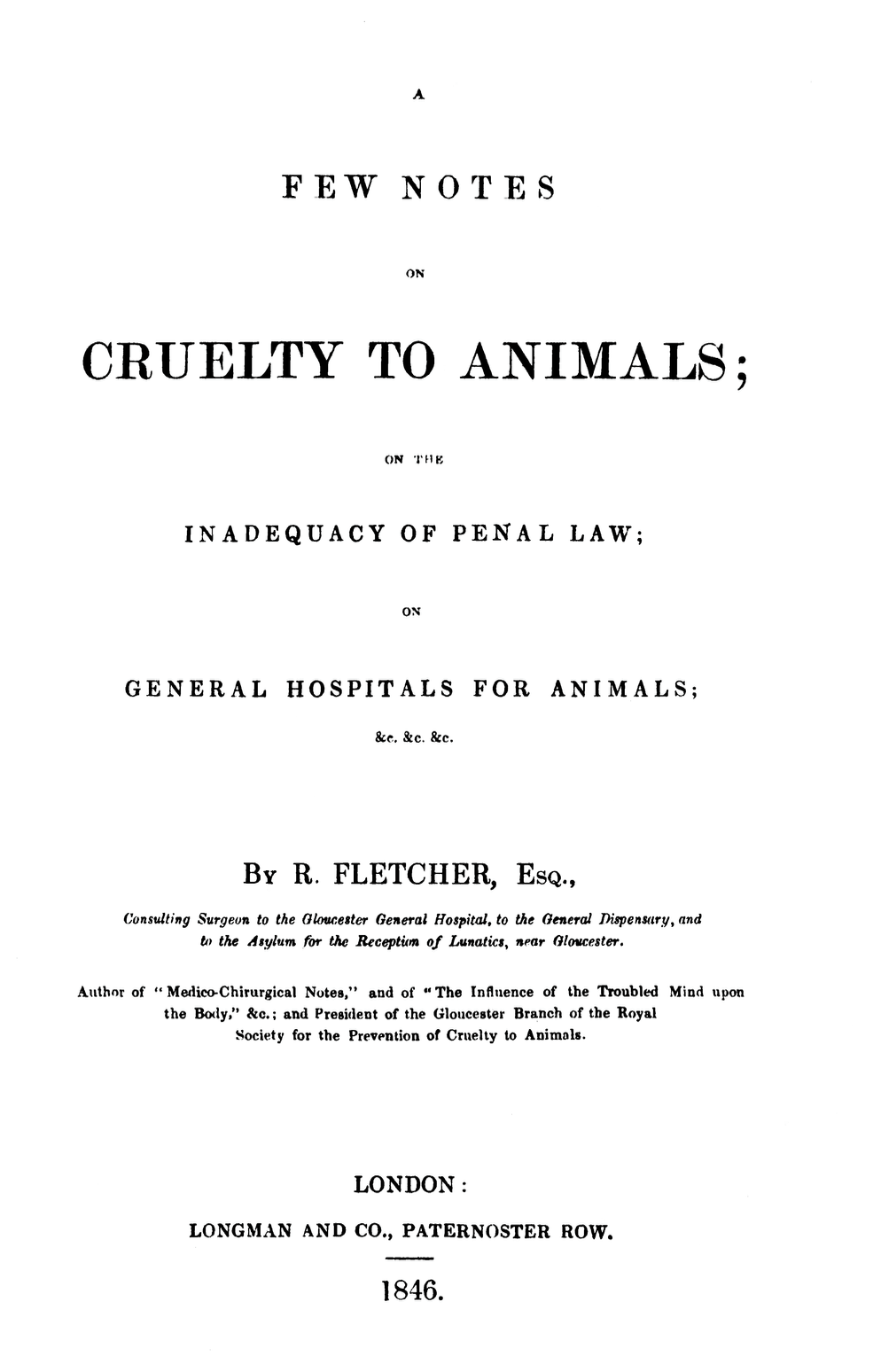
- First edition title page
- Author: Ralph Fletcher
- Language: English
- Subject: Animal cruelty, animal welfare, Christian ethics
- Genre: Treatise
- Publisher: Longman and Co.
- Publication date: 1846
- Publication place: United Kingdom of Great Britain and Ireland
- Media type: Print (hardcover)
- Pages: 105
- OCLC: 970699961
- Text: A Few Notes on Cruelty to Animals at the Internet Archive

A Few Notes on Cruelty to Animals; on the Inadequacy of Penal Law; on General Hospitals for Animals; &c. &c. &c. is an 1846 treatise by the English surgeon Ralph Fletcher. Published in London by Longman and Co., it discusses the treatment of animals in Victorian Britain and argues that existing cruelty laws did not do enough to prevent abuse. Fletcher writes about the suffering of working and domestic animals and calls for stronger penalties for cruelty, supervision of slaughterhouses, humane education, and hospitals for animals.

The book was reviewed in contemporary periodicals including the London Medical Gazette, The Athenaeum, and The Veterinary Record. It was later noted by writers including Henry S. Salt and Charles R. Magel.

== Background ==
Ralph Fletcher (1780—1851) was a surgeon based in Gloucester. He studied at St Bartholomew's Hospital in London and received an M.D. from the University of Edinburgh Medical School. He held appointments at the Gloucester Infirmary, Dispensary, and Lunatic Asylum. He published medical papers on the relation between mental and physical health.

Fletcher was twice elected Mayor of Gloucester and served as president of the local branch of the Society for the Prevention of Cruelty to Animals in Gloucester.

He lived on Barton Street, near the city's animal pound, and his observations of the animals kept there were said to have inspired A Few Notes on Cruelty to Animals.

== Summary ==
In a brief "Preliminary Note", Fletcher writes about the suffering of animals, especially those dependent on humans. He rejects the view that animals are insensible to pain or that their suffering is divinely ordained, and argues for compassion on moral and theological grounds.

In "Importance of the Subject", Fletcher draws on his experience as president of the Society for the Prevention of Cruelty to Animals in Gloucester. He writes that public acts of cruelty form only a small part of a wider problem, and that abuse often takes place in private spaces such as stables, slaughterhouses, and homes. He argues that existing legislation was inadequate, because small fines and judicial discretion to reduce sentences did not deter offenders.

The main part of the book consists of notes on individual animals and practices. Fletcher describes donkeys as animals commonly subjected to overwork and neglect. He condemns blood sports such as shooting tied cocks and badger-baiting. His discussion of cats and dogs contrasts their treatment: he writes that cats were often tormented or killed for amusement, while dogs suffered from starvation, beatings, cart-work, and fighting.

Later sections concern livestock. Fletcher criticises methods used in the rearing and slaughter of calves and lambs, including starvation and repeated bleeding to produce white veal. Horses receive the most attention. He writes about overwork, neglect, and abandonment, and argues that owners as well as drivers should be held legally responsible.

Fletcher ends by calling for tougher penalties for cruelty, official oversight of slaughterhouses and stables, wider public instruction in humane treatment, and hospitals for sick and injured animals.

== Reception ==
A review in the London Medical Gazette described the book as the work of a hospital surgeon acquainted with suffering. The reviewer agreed with Fletcher's criticism of animal experimentation, but called his proposal for hospitals for animals a "somewhat Utopian scheme" said to have some precedent in the East.

The Athenaeum wrote that Fletcher's view that cruelty to animals harmed human character was convincing and agreed that such acts should be treated as offences against society. The review praised his sympathy for animals and his proposal for animal hospitals, though it also referred to an "excess of sentiment" towards lower creatures.

The Veterinary Record referred to the book's descriptions of local cases and supported Fletcher's proposals for legal and institutional reform, including hospitals for animals.

== Legacy ==
The book was included by Henry S. Salt in the "Bibliography of Animal Rights" section of his 1892 work Animals' Rights: Considered in Relation to Social Progress, where he referred to it as a treatise on animal cruelty.

In his 1989 reference work Keyguide to Information Sources in Animal Rights, Charles R. Magel described A Few Notes on Cruelty to Animals as an early account of animal abuse in the Gloucester area and noted its proposal for hospitals for animals modelled on human institutions.

== Publication history ==
A Few Notes on Cruelty to Animals was published in London in 1846 by Longman and Co., comprising 105 pages in octavo format. The text is now in the public domain.

== See also ==
- Animal welfare in the United Kingdom
- Remarks on Cruelty to Animals – 1795 pamphlet published by George Nicholson
- Some Remarks on Cruelty to Animals – 1865 anonymous pamphlet
