= A Reasonable Plea for the Animal Creation =

1746 book by Robert Morris

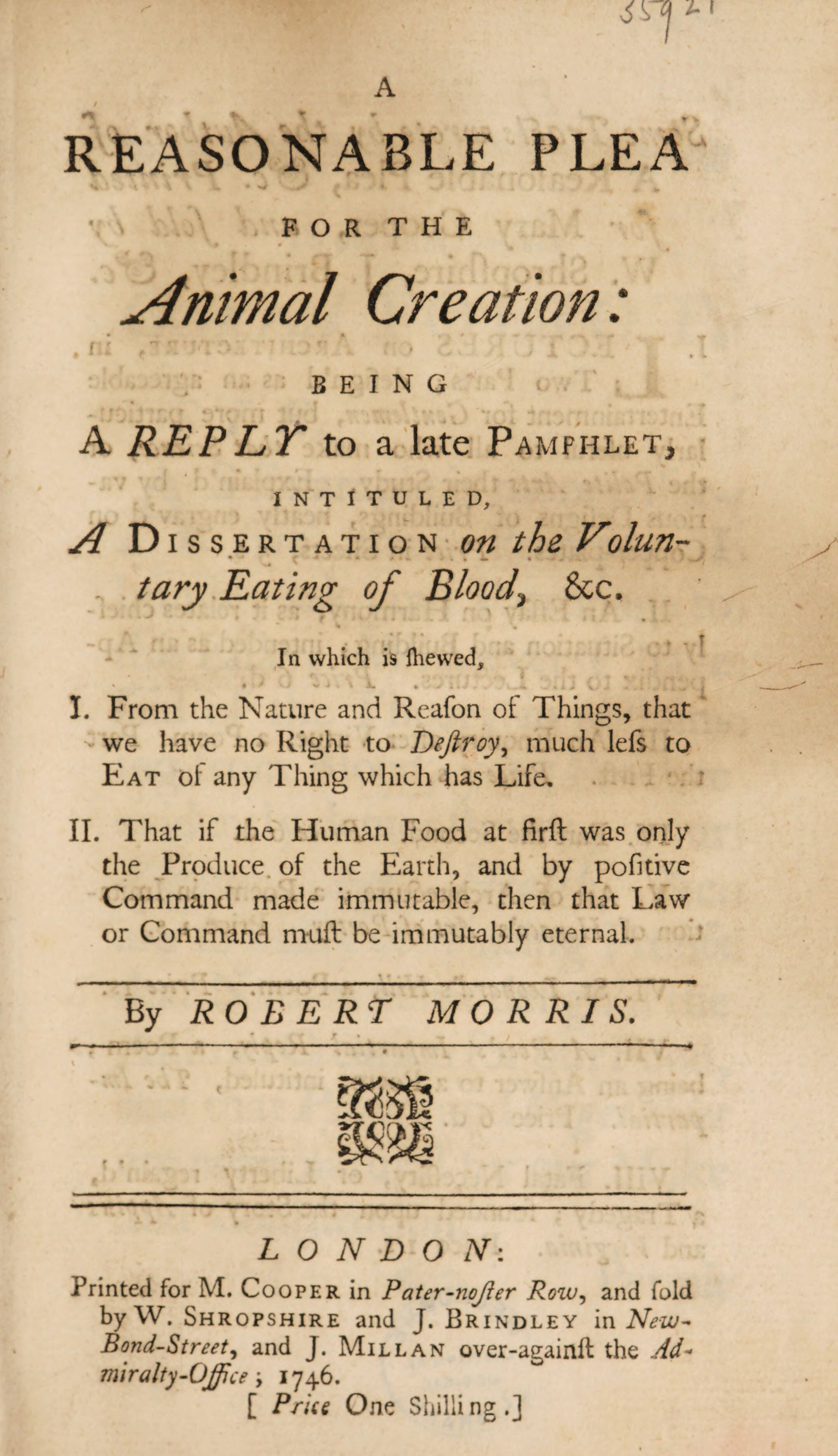
- First edition title page
- Author: Robert Morris
- Language: English
- Subject: Christian vegetarianism; ethical vegetarianism
- Genre: Treatise
- Publisher: M. Cooper
- Publication date: 1746
- Publication place: Kingdom of Great Britain
- Media type: Print
- Pages: 68
- OCLC: 642481846
- Text: A Reasonable Plea for the Animal Creation at the Internet Archive

A Reasonable Plea for the Animal Creation: Being a Reply to a Late Pamphlet, Intituled, A Dissertation on the Voluntary Eating of Blood, &c. (Note: Full title: A Reasonable Plea for the Animal Creation: Being a Reply to a Late Pamphlet, Intituled, A Dissertation on the Voluntary Eating of Blood, &c. In Which Is Shewed, I. From the Nature and Reason of Things, That We Have No Right to Destroy, Much Less to Eat of Any Thing Which Has Life II. That If the Human Food at First Was Only the Produce of the Earth, and by Positive Command Made Immutable, Then That Law or Command Must Be Immutably Eternal.) is a 1746 treatise by the English writer and architectural theorist Robert Morris. Written in reply to A Dissertation on the Voluntary Eating of Blood, it argues against meat-eating on grounds of natural law, moral duty, and the claim that the diet originally given to humans was vegetarian. The work was republished in 2005 in Organization & Environment with an introduction by Carol J. Adams.

== Background ==
Robert Morris (1703–1754) was an English writer on architecture. His published works include Lectures on Architecture (1734–36), An Essay on Harmony (1739), and The Art of Architecture (1742). He also wrote poems, essays, and pamphlets, and worked as a surveyor.

According to Adams, Morris encountered A Dissertation on the Voluntary Eating of Blood in 1745. Expecting an argument against flesh-eating, he instead found a defence of meat consumption based on a post-Flood reading of Genesis. Morris disagreed with that interpretation and wrote a reply, which was published in 1746 as A Reasonable Plea for the Animal Creation.

== Contents ==
The treatise is made up of a preface, a letter to General Foliot, nine letters addressed to a friend, and a concluding reply to A Dissertation on the Voluntary Eating of Blood. Adams writes that the central part of the book consists of letters Morris had written in 1737 and 1738 and later incorporated into the printed work.

Morris argues that humans have no natural right to kill animals for food. He appeals both to Genesis and to "the nature and reason of things", maintaining that the food originally given to humans was the produce of the earth. He rejects attempts to justify meat-eating through scripture, custom, bodily necessity, or animal predation.

He also argues that humans are not naturally fitted for carnivory, and describes butchery and cookery as artificial practices rather than natural ones. Drawing on writers such as Pythagoras and Plutarch, he attributes feeling and a degree of rationality to animals and treats their destruction for food as a matter of cruelty and injustice.

== Publication history ==
A Reasonable Plea for the Animal Creation was published by M. Cooper in Paternoster Row, London, in 1746. Adams states that it was omitted from bibliographies of Morris' work both in his lifetime and by later architectural historians.

In 2005, the treatise was republished in Organization & Environment with an introductory article by Carol J. Adams.

== Reception ==
...I believe it inconsistent with Humanity to eat Flesh, inconsistent with our Nature, or the Intentions of God in our first Formation, to imbrue our Teeth in the Blood of the Animals. They have the same Sense of Pleasure and Pain as we have ...

— Robert Morris, A Reasonable Plea for the Animal Creation, p. 23.

In her introduction to the 2005 republication, Carol J. Adams describes the treatise as a neglected contribution to 18th-century vegetarian and animal-ethical writing. She argues that Morris' case against flesh-eating is centred less on health than on moral obligation, and that his appeal to the "light of Nature" gives the work a distinctive place among early vegetarian texts.

Adams also comments on the book's epistolary form, noting that its letters are addressed to a flesh-eating friend. She treats that structure as part of the book's argument, since Morris repeatedly answers objections and defends vegetarianism against the assumptions of a meat-eating society.

She further notes Morris' rejection of claims of human superiority and his attribution of sentience and reason to animals. On Adams' reading, these features connect the treatise to later debates in animal ethics.

== Legacy ==
Before its republication in 2005, the treatise had appeared only occasionally in modern writing. James B. Whisker, John Simons, and Rod Preece each referred to it as an early contribution to vegetarian and animal-ethical thought.

Simons described Morris, together with John Hildrop, as a precursor to Humphry Primatt. Preece quoted from the treatise and placed Morris among earlier writers who argued for vegetarianism on ethical grounds, including John Oswald, George Nicholson, Joseph Ritson, and John Frank Newton.

== See also ==
- Bibliography of veganism and vegetarianism
- History of vegetarianism
- Vegetarianism in the Romantic Era
