= Remarks on Cruelty to Animals =

1795 pamphlet published by George Nicholson

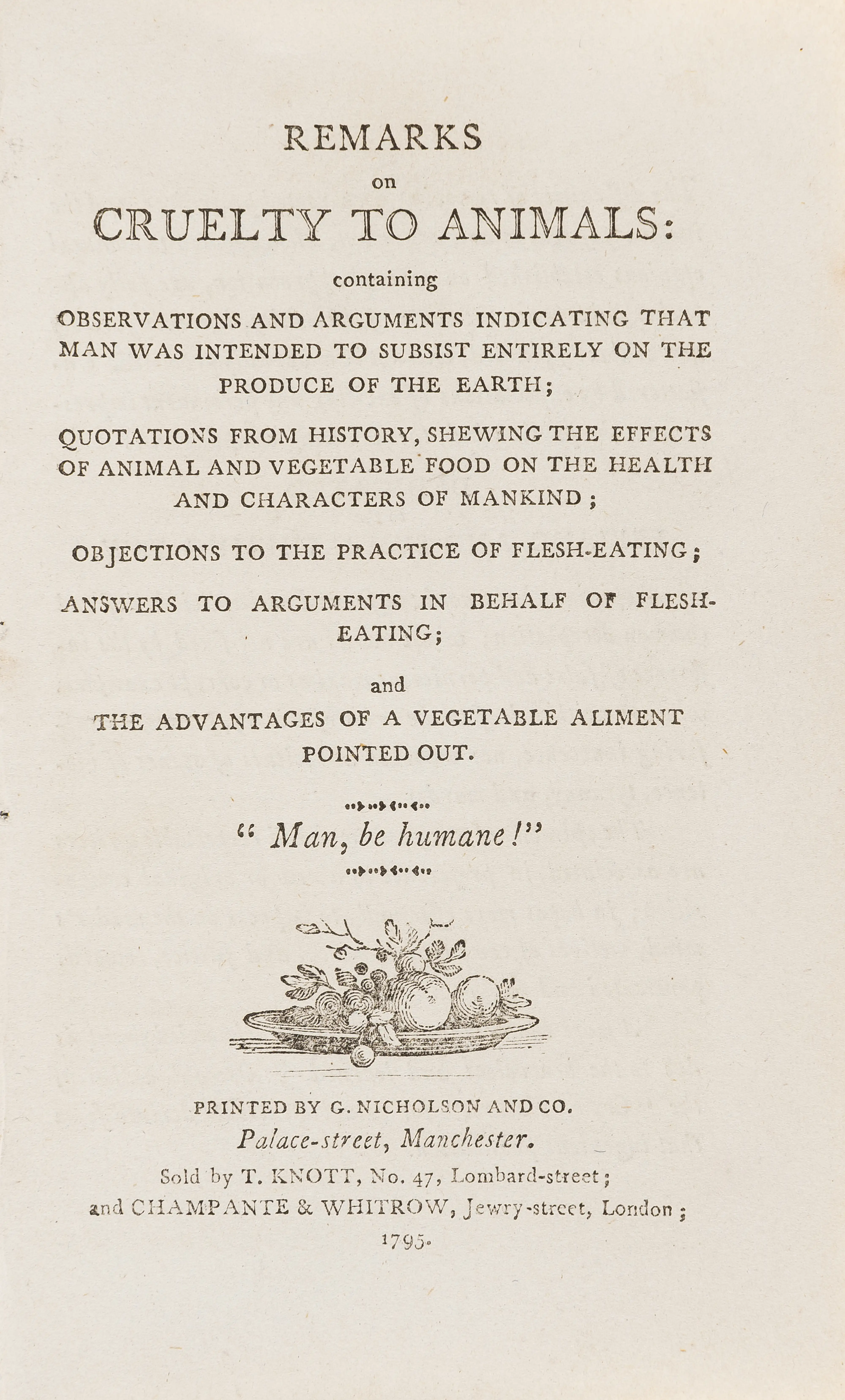
- First edition title page
- Author: Anonymous
- Language: English
- Subjects: Animal welfare; vegetarianism
- Publisher: G. Nicholson and Co.
- Publication date: 1795
- Publication place: Kingdom of Great Britain
- Media type: Print (pamphlet)
- Pages: 54

Remarks on Cruelty to Animals (Note: Full title: Remarks on Cruelty to Animals: Containing Observations and Arguments Indicating that Man Was Intended to Subsist Entirely on the Produce of the Earth; Quotations from History, Shewing the Effects of Animal and Vegetable Food on the Health and Characters of Mankind; Objections to the Practice of Flesh-Eating; Answers to Arguments in Behalf of Flesh-Eating; and the Advantages of a Vegetable Aliment Pointed Out.) is an anonymous pamphlet published in Manchester in 1795 by George Nicholson. It argues against killing animals for food and advocates vegetarianism on moral and health grounds. Drawing on historical, literary and religious sources, particularly John Oswald's The Cry of Nature (1791), the pamphlet discusses animal suffering, the effects of diet on human health and character, and objections to eating meat.

== Publication ==
Remarks on Cruelty to Animals was published by George Nicholson (1760–1825), a printer who had previously worked in Bradford before moving to Manchester. Nicholson also published works on vegetarianism and the treatment of animals. Rod Preece describes his On the Conduct of Man to Inferior Animals (1797) as a compilation of earlier vegetarian and animal protection writings, subsequently expanded as On the Primeval Diet of Man; Arguments in Favour of Vegetable Foods; On Man's Conduct to Animals &c. &c. (1801).

The pamphlet was published anonymously in Manchester in 1795. It comprised 54 pages in duodecimo format and was sold by T. Knott and Champante & Whitrow in London.

Rare-books curator Karen Attar describes the pamphlet as appearing in a miscellany alongside John Gregory's A Father's Legacy to His Daughters and a collection titled Preceptive, Moral and Sentimental Pieces. She suggests that the arrangement was intended to encourage readers interested in one work to read the others.

== Content ==
Remarks on Cruelty to Animals brings together arguments against eating animals and in favour of a vegetable diet. Its title page advertises "Quotations from History", and the pamphlet draws extensively on earlier writings, particularly John Oswald's The Cry of Nature (1791). Other sources include William Cowper's poetry, John Dryden's translation of Ovid, George Sale's translation of the Qur'an, Buffon's Natural History, James Adair's History of the American Indians (1775), Peter Simon Pallas's work on sheep (1794), and the writings of physician George Cheyne.

The title page includes an appeal to humane conduct taken from Jean-Jacques Rousseau's Emile. The author argues that animal food is a luxury rather than a necessity, observing that many people, particularly the poor, consume little meat because of its expense. The pamphlet cites examples of vegetarian practices in antiquity and maintains that agriculture encourages peaceful and humane dispositions.

The author also advances health arguments for vegetarianism, claiming that vegetable foods promote longevity, physical strength and mental well-being. Meat consumption is associated with digestive disorders and adverse effects on the mind. Among the examples given is the claim that infants breastfed by vegetarian nurses are less susceptible to intestinal complaints than those fed by women who eat meat.

The pamphlet argues that killing animals is contrary to human nature because people generally recoil from bloodshed. It suggests that consumers would be less willing to eat meat if they witnessed the slaughter of the animals from which it came. Drawing on accounts of animal behaviour, the author presents animals as sentient beings capable of reasoning and social conduct, and describes their slaughter for food as murder.

The concluding passage, taken from Oswald's The Cry of Nature, returns to the benefits of a vegetable diet, presenting it as conducive to bodily health, mental pleasure and intellectual life.

== Later discussion ==
In a 2020 article about a copy acquired by Senate House Library, Karen Attar examined the pamphlet's moral and medical arguments for vegetarianism. She observed that its arguments remained familiar in later vegetarian advocacy, although it did not address environmental concerns or the economic advantages of using agricultural land to grow food rather than raise livestock. Attar also noted the pamphlet's small, potentially inexpensive format and considered whether it might have influenced later vegetarian advocacy in Manchester, while acknowledging that such influence could not be established.

Historian Diana Donald discusses Remarks on Cruelty to Animals alongside Oswald's The Cry of Nature in her study of women's involvement in animal protection. In examining Mary Wollstonecraft's emphasis on women's rationality and her scepticism towards the late-18th-century "cult of sensibility", Donald refers to contemporary radical arguments for animal rights.

== See also ==
- History of animal rights
- Animal welfare in the United Kingdom
- History of vegetarianism
- Vegetarianism in the Romantic era
- A Few Notes on Cruelty to Animals – 1846 book by Ralph Fletcher
- Some Remarks on Cruelty to Animals – 1865 anonymous pamphlet
