= Some Remarks on Cruelty to Animals, and the Principles in Human Nature from which That Vice Proceeds =

1865 anonymous pamphlet

Some Remarks on Cruelty to Animals, and the Principles in Human Nature from Which That Vice Proceeds
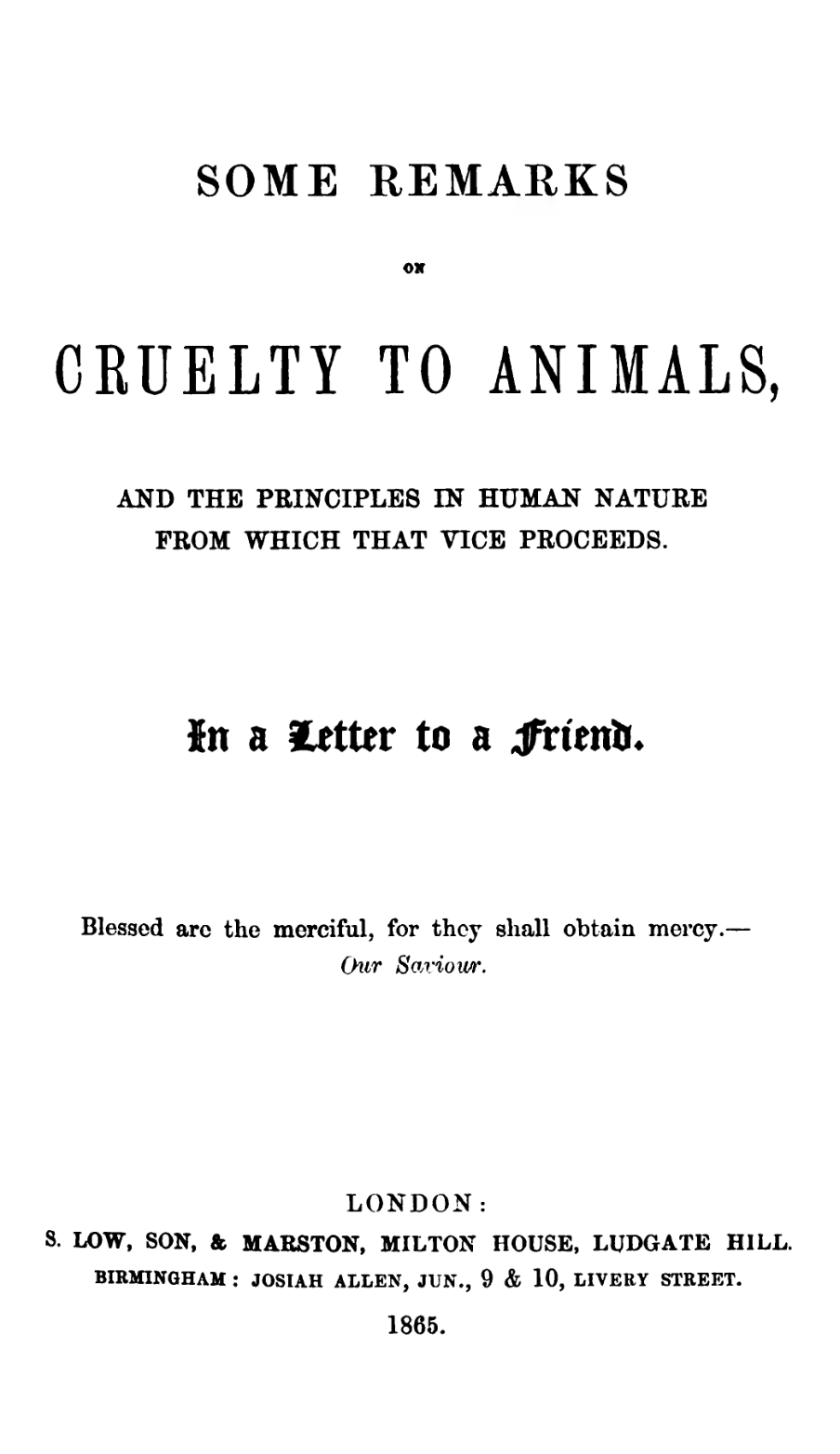
- First edition title page
- Author: Anonymous
- Language: English
- Subjects: Animal cruelty; animal welfare; Christian ethics
- Genre: Epistolary literature
- Publisher: S. Low, Son, & Marston; Josiah Allen, jun.
- Publication date: 1865
- Publication place: United Kingdom of Great Britain and Ireland
- Media type: Print (pamphlet)
- Pages: 83
- OCLC: 308543337
- Text: Some Remarks on Cruelty to Animals, and the Principles in Human Nature from Which That Vice Proceeds at Google Books

Some Remarks on Cruelty to Animals, and the Principles in Human Nature from Which That Vice Proceeds. In a Letter to a Friend is an anonymous pamphlet published in 1865 by S. Low, Son, & Marston in London and Josiah Allen, jun. in Birmingham. Written as a deathbed letter to an unnamed friend, it discusses animal cruelty and animal welfare from a Christian ethical perspective. The pamphlet argues that intense physical pain is the most severe form of suffering, considers animal suffering in relation to sin and divine providence, and criticises practices including the treatment of livestock, hunting and other blood sports, and some experimentation on animals.

== Publication ==
Some Remarks on Cruelty to Animals, and the Principles in Human Nature from Which That Vice Proceeds was published anonymously in 1865, with an imprint for S. Low, Son, & Marston in London and Josiah Allen, jun. in Birmingham. It comprised 83 pages in octavo format and was priced at one shilling.

== Summary ==
Written as a deathbed letter to an unnamed friend and dated 1 October 1865, the pamphlet argues that intense physical pain is the most severe form of suffering. It suggests that legal and social protections for humans mean that comparable physical suffering is more often borne by animals than by people. The author frames cruelty to animals as raising a theological problem about animal suffering, and discusses suffering caused by predation, in which one animal lives by killing another.

The author distinguishes between "cruelty proper", described as indifference to, or pleasure in, another creature's agony, and other motives that may lead to cruel conduct. The pamphlet argues that strong family and social attachments may coexist with a lack of concern for animal suffering.

The pamphlet compares cruelty with offences against property, arguing that social and legal judgments often treat cruelty more lightly than theft. It includes examples involving livestock being driven to slaughter, including a case in which a drover was fined for setting a fire under an exhausted ox's head after it collapsed on the road.

Later passages discuss blood sports and hunting. The author rejects arguments that hunted animals suffer less than they would in nature, describes the fear and exhaustion involved in coursing and fox-hunting, and distinguishes between the excitement of pursuits such as fox-hunting and spectacles such as cock fighting and dog fighting.

The pamphlet also gives practical recommendations. It urges readers who eat meat to ensure animals are killed by "humane slaughtermen" and to supervise the conditions of slaughter. It discusses responsibilities toward domestic animals, including the disposal of unwanted litters. It criticises some experimentation on animals, while allowing that certain experiments might be justified if they were necessary for scientific progress.

== Reception ==
A brief notice in the Sunday Dispatch described the pamphlet as well-meaning but "somewhat heavy". It commented on the pamphlet's sympathetic account of a fox pursued during a hunt, and added an ironic aside contrasting this with the fact that foxes themselves kill geese.

A notice in the Birmingham Gazette described the pamphlet as written "in the kindest spirit" and "worth a careful reading", while remarking that such works rarely reach those "who need them most". It drew attention to the author's criticism that the law on cruelty to animals protected cattle and domestic animals but not wild animals, which the reviewer called an anomaly and a mistake on the grounds that wild animals also suffer pain and torture.

== Later discussion ==
In 1872, the American animal welfare magazine Our Dumb Animals included the pamphlet in a bibliographic feature titled "Humane Books, Papers and Essays".

In Conceptualizing Cruelty to Children in Nineteenth-century England, Monica Flegel listed the pamphlet among 19th-century essays that linked animals and children in discussions of cruelty and the development of a humane disposition. She discussed it alongside Clara Balfour's Cruelty and Cowardice: A Word to Butchers and their Boys (1866) and later animal welfare and animal rights periodicals.

In Women Against Cruelty: Protection of Animals in Nineteenth-Century Britain, Diana Donald cited the pamphlet as an example of arguments that cruelty to animals could be compatible with conventional standards of respectability. She quoted the pamphlet's claim that an individual's "instinct of cruelty" to animals, or indifference to their suffering, could coexist with kindness to other humans, and that a reputation for kindness could make cruelty to animals appear unobjectionable.

Donald also compared the pamphlet with Anna Sewell's Black Beauty, writing that the pamphlet's author claimed to be writing from a deathbed and discussed what it called the "inexplicable" problem of why creatures "incapable of sin or moral offence" suffer, while stressing the severity of acute physical pain.

== See also ==
- Animal welfare in the United Kingdom
- Christian vegetarianism – Vegetarianism based on Christian religious views
- Problem of evil – Philosophical question
- Theodicy – Theological attempt to resolve the problem of evil
- Remarks on Cruelty to Animals – 1795 pamphlet published by George Nicholson
- A Few Notes on Cruelty to Animals – 1846 book by Ralph Fletcher
