= Acetaria: A Discourse of Sallets =

1699 treatise by John Evelyn

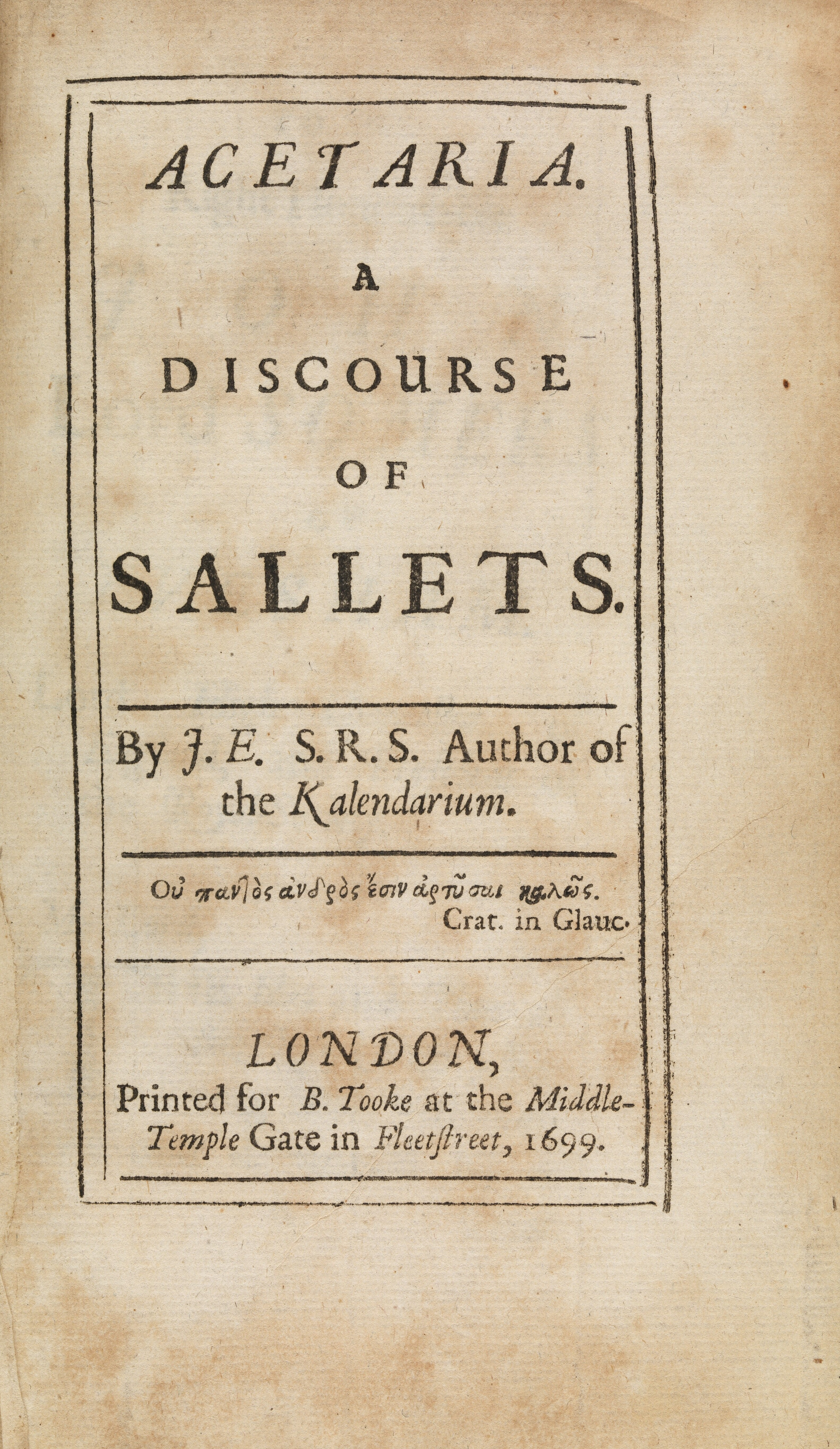
- First edition title page
- Author: John Evelyn
- Language: English
- Subject: Salads; vegetable cookery; gardening
- Genre: Treatise; cookbook
- Publisher: B. Tooke
- Publication date: 1699
- Publication place: Kingdom of England
- Media type: Print
- Pages: 40 + 192 + 48
- OCLC: 13820847

Acetaria: A Discourse of Sallets is a 1699 treatise by the English writer John Evelyn on salads, vegetable cookery, and gardening. It discusses the cultivation and preparation of salad plants, includes a catalogue of 82 ingredients, and gives a nine-part method for dressing a salad. The work also draws on classical and medical authorities, including Galen, in its discussion of diet and health.

The text grew out of material Evelyn had assembled by the late 1670s and was connected to his larger horticultural project Elysium Britannicum. It has often been described as the first standalone book devoted to salads. Later writers have discussed it in relation to the history of cookery and vegetarian writing.

== Background ==
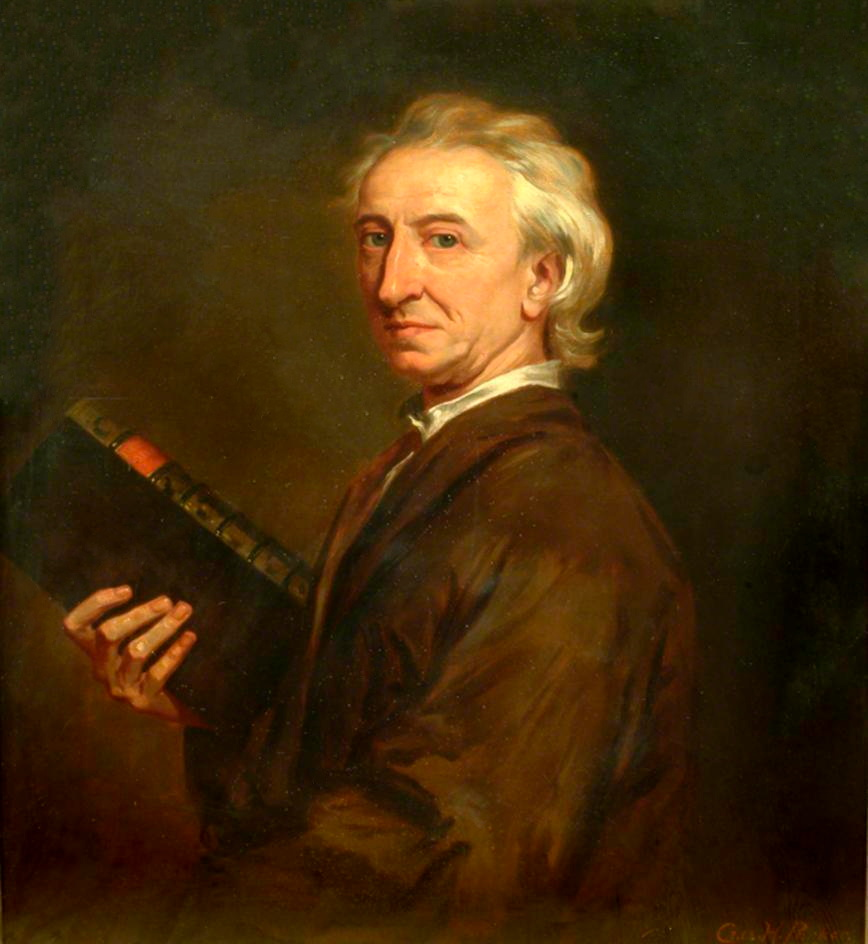
Evelyn in 1687

John Evelyn (1620–1706) was an English author, diarist, and country gentleman, known for works on art, forestry, and religion. He studied at Oxford and the Middle Temple before travelling in Europe. After the Restoration, he held public offices and became a fellow of the Royal Society in 1662. He wrote on subjects including engraving and forestry, and his Sylva, or A Discourse of Forest-Trees and the Propagation of Timber (1664) was widely read.

In 1668, Robert Boyle printed in the Philosophical Transactions a list of questions for inquiry, including "What herbs are fit to make Sallets, and how are they to be ordered for that purpose?" C. F. Main writes that this question prompted Evelyn to write Acetaria. Material for the work had been gathered by 1679 and was first intended for Evelyn's horticultural manuscript Elysium Britannicum. That work was published posthumously in 2001.

Sandra Sherman relates the book to 17th-century religious ideas about diet and the Garden of Eden, including the idea of a prelapsarian vegetarian diet. Writers have also placed it alongside other contemporary works on plants and gardening, including books by Nehemiah Grew and Hugh Plat.

== Content ==
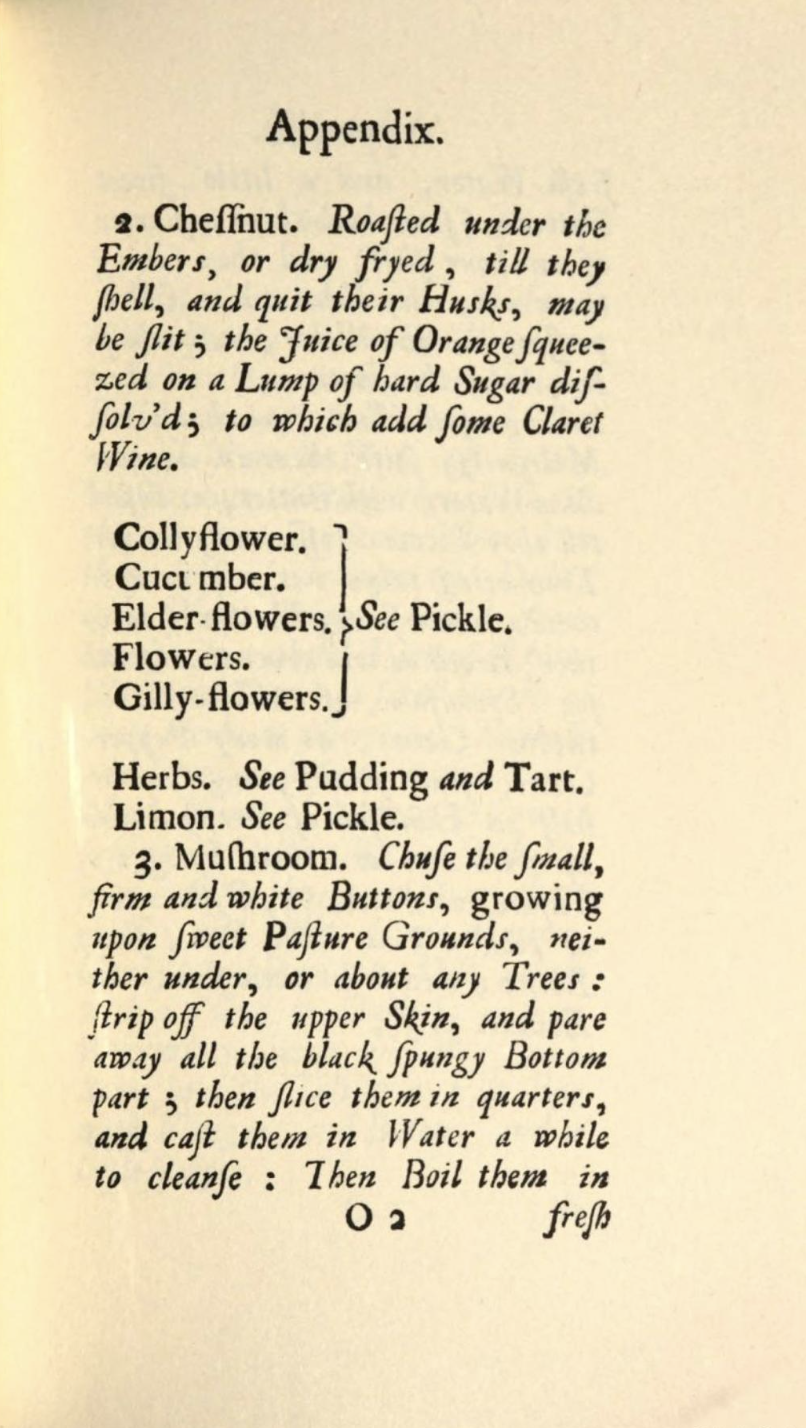
An excerpt outlining vegetable and herb preparations

Acetaria discusses the history and dietary use of raw vegetables and cites ancient and early modern authorities, including Galen. Alongside these discussions, it gives practical advice on growing, choosing, and preparing salad ingredients.

The book contains a catalogue of 82 salad plants, with notes on season and preparation. It also sets out a nine-part method for dressing a salad. Evelyn recommends careful washing and seasoning, and discusses suitable implements and vessels. Among his recommendations are silver knives, porcelain or Delftware bowls rather than pewter, and wine vinegar infused with aromatics such as cloves and rosemary.

The work ends with an appendix of recipes. Sherman describes its central salad recipe as an attempt to present an ideal form of the dish and connects this to contemporary interest in Edenic imagery and restoration.

== Publication history ==
Acetaria was published in 1699, printed for B. Tooke on Fleet Street, London. It was dedicated to Lord Chancellor John Somers, president of the Royal Society, and Evelyn personally presented him with a copy. A second edition was published in 1706, also printed by B. Tooke.

In 1937, an edition was published by the Women's Auxiliary of the Brooklyn Botanic Garden, with a foreword by Helen Morgenthau Fox. In 1996, another edition was published by Prospect Books, edited by Christopher P. Driver, with an introduction by Tom Jaine.

== Reception ==
In The Ethics of Diet (1883), Howard Williams treated Acetaria as an early work in favour of a vegetarian diet and wrote that it had been neglected by later writers.

In 1983, C. F. Main described the book as a "delightful" work and wrote that it showed Evelyn's wit, curiosity, and learning.

== Legacy ==
Acetaria has often been described as the first book on salads. Modern writers have also discussed it as more than a recipe book. Sherman places it in the history of vegetarian and cookery writing, and argues that it brought together questions of seasonality, health, taste, and domestic practice. Caroline Lieffers discusses it as a work concerned with gardens, books, the body, and the table, and as part of Evelyn's wider habits of collecting and ordering knowledge.

== See also ==
- Bibliography of veganism and vegetarianism
- Christian vegetarianism
- History of English cuisine
- History of vegetarianism
