= Rachel Prescott =

British poet & philanthropist (1766–1824)

- Born: 1766; Leigh, Greater Manchester, England
- Died: 6 December 1824 (aged 57–58)
- Occupations: Poet and philanthropist

Rachel Prescott (1766 – 6 December 1824) was a British poet and philanthropist. She wrote about philanthropy and good works and left her own estate to found a charity.

== Life ==
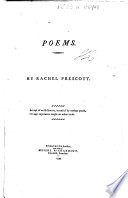
Poems by Rachel Prescott 1799

Prescott was born in Leigh, Greater Manchester, England. Prescott's father had printed the Manchester Journal from 1754 to 1761. She is thought to have assisted with Prescott's Manchester Journal, which was a newspaper her father founded in 1771 and was then printed weekly until 1780.

In 1799, she published Poems ('by Rachel Prescott') which was reprinted by Longman in 1812. Her book of poems was dedicated to the printer and vegetarianism advocate George Nicholson. Nicholson and his brother had just moved their printing business to Manchester. Her dedication was based on his "congeniality of mind, and on principles which can experience neither alloy nor decay". She exchanged letters with William Godwin about the nature of marriage. Godwin's first wife, the early feminist Mary Wollstonecraft, had died in childbirth in 1797. Godwin responded with a considered reply in April 1799. She had read the works of Godwin and Wollstonecraft and years before she had published verses based on Wollstonecraft's Vindication of the Rights of Woman in the Star newspaper. These "Stanzas to the late Mrs Godwin2 were included in her 1799 book.

She wrote about philanthropy and good works and left her own estate, which included a house in Exchange Street, to found a charity. The charity was to support elderly Anglican people in the area of Leigh. Prescott died aged 58 on 6 December 1824. She was buried at the Swedenborgian St John's Church, Manchester.

The charity that she founded was registered until 2011.
