= Robert Morris (British writer) =

English writer (1703–1754)

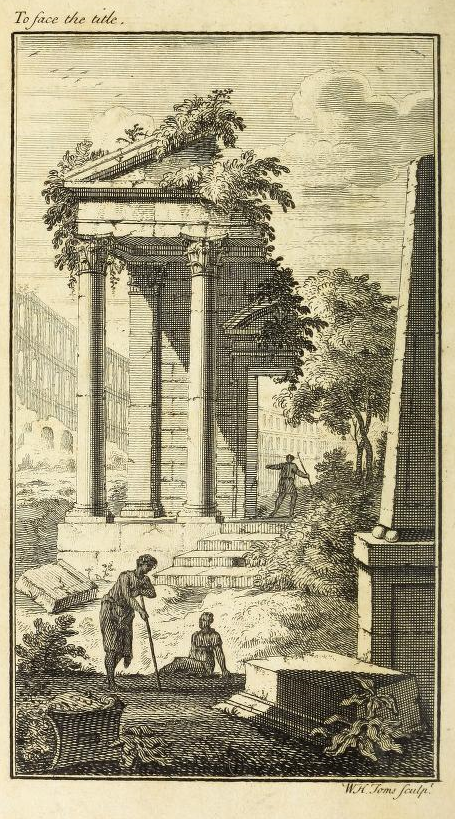
- Frontispiece to Lectures on Architecture, 1759
- Born: February 1703; Twickenham, England
- Died: 12 November 1754 (aged 51); London, England
- Occupations: Writer; architectural theorist; surveyor
- Known for: Contributions to the Palladian revival; early writing on vegetarianism and animal rights
- Notable work: An Essay in Defence of Ancient Architecture (1728); Lectures on Architecture (1734–1736); A Reasonable Plea for the Animal Creation (1746)
- Children: 4
- Relatives: Roger Morris

Robert Morris (February 1703 – 12 November 1754) was an English writer, architectural theorist, and surveyor. He wrote on Palladian architecture and published architectural treatises and pattern books, including Lectures on Architecture (1734–1736), Rural Architecture (1750), and The Architectural Remembrancer (1751). Few executed works can be securely attributed to him, but he worked as a surveyor and has been associated with projects including Inveraray Castle, Richmond Park, and Culverthorpe Hall.

Morris also published anonymous philosophical and satirical works. His 1746 essay A Reasonable Plea for the Animal Creation argued for moral consideration of animals and has been discussed in histories of animal ethics and vegetarianism.

== Biography ==
=== Early life and education ===
Robert Morris was born in February 1703 in Twickenham, the son of Thomas Morris, a joiner.

Morris received his architectural education while working under his kinsman, Roger Morris, who held the post of "carpenter and principal engineer to the Board of Ordnance" and died on 31 January 1749.

=== Career ===
==== Architectural career ====
Morris first came to public attention with the publication of An Essay in Defence of Ancient Architecture (1728). In the work, he contrasted modern baroque buildings, including examples in Twickenham, with classical models, especially those associated with Andrea Palladio. He expressed admiration for architects including Christopher Wren and James Gibbs, while criticising many contemporary buildings. He made exceptions for figures including Lord Burlington, Henry Herbert, 10th Earl of Pembroke, and Sir Andrew Fountaine.

His main theoretical work was the two-volume Lectures on Architecture (1734–1736), a series of 14 lectures presented to an otherwise unidentified "Society established for the Improvement of Arts and Sciences". Morris argued that design should respond to setting, for example that a flat, open landscape suited the simplicity of the Doric order. He also proposed a modular system of seven ideal geometric proportions, compared with musical notes. These ideas were developed further in two anonymously published works: An Essay on Harmony (1739) and The Art of Architecture, a Poem (1742). Gerald Beasley states that Morris's writings received limited attention in his lifetime, and describes them as among the more substantial architectural theories published in eighteenth-century Britain.

Morris also produced two pattern books: Rural Architecture (1750) and The Architectural Remembrancer (1751). Both were reissued in 1755 under new titles by Robert Sayer, and again in 1757 with additional unused designs originally created for The Modern Builder's Assistant.

Morris worked professionally as a surveyor. His commissions included overseeing work at Culverthorpe Hall, Lincolnshire, for Sir Michael Newton in the early 1730s; assessing a model of the Mansion House, London, for the City of London in 1740; surveying brickwork for the banker George Middleton in Twickenham in 1743; and measuring plasterwork at Sir William Beauchamp Proctor's house in Bruton Street, London, in 1753 or 1754. He also produced unexecuted designs for the Octagon Chapel in Norwich in 1753–1754. Plans for the south front of Culverthorpe Hall have also been connected with Morris, although Beasley states that these are more securely attributed to Roger Morris.

The earliest executed work attributed to Robert Morris is the Gothic-style Inveraray Castle, begun in 1745 and completed in 1761. Roger Morris is thought to have contributed to the initial design, with Robert supervising construction after Roger's death. The central tower was destroyed by fire in 1877 and rebuilt in 1880. Robert Morris also collaborated with S. Wright on the central portion of the lodge in Richmond Park for George II, although the design has also been attributed to Henry Herbert, 10th Earl of Pembroke.

Around 1750, Morris remodelled a house at Hammersmith for George Bubb Dodington, later known as Brandenburgh House, which was demolished in 1822. He was also responsible for the construction of Coomb Bank in Kent and Wimbledon House in Surrey, probably in collaboration with Lord Burlington. Wimbledon House was destroyed by fire in 1785; its ancillary buildings were used as a residence until a new house by Henry Holland was completed in 1801. Around the same period, Morris and Burlington also designed Kirby Hall in Yorkshire, with interior work carried out by John Carr of York. The plans were reportedly based on ideas provided by the owner, S. Thompson. In 1736, Morris also constructed a Palladian-style bridge at Wilton House in Wiltshire.

==== Other writing ====
Morris anonymously authored several literary and professional works, including An Enquiry into Virtue (1740), Yes, They Are (1740), Have at You All (1740), and Rupert to Maria: An Heroic Epistle (1748). He may also have written the political play Fatal Necessity; or Liberty Regain'd (1742, Dublin), as well as two pamphlets for surveyors in 1752: The Qualifications and Duty of a Surveyor and a Second Letter on the same subject.

==== Animal advocacy ====
Morris wrote the essay A Reasonable Plea for the Animal Creation (1746), which argued against cruelty to animals and in favour of moral consideration for animals. Carol J. Adams has described the work as a valuable addition to the history of vegetarianism. In 2005, Organization & Environment republished the essay.

=== Later life and death ===
By 1740, Morris was living on Hyde Park Street, near Grosvenor Square in London, and remained there until at least 1751. He died on 12 November 1754. His will directed that his books and drawings be sold to support his children: Thomas, Mary, James, and Hannah.

== Publications ==
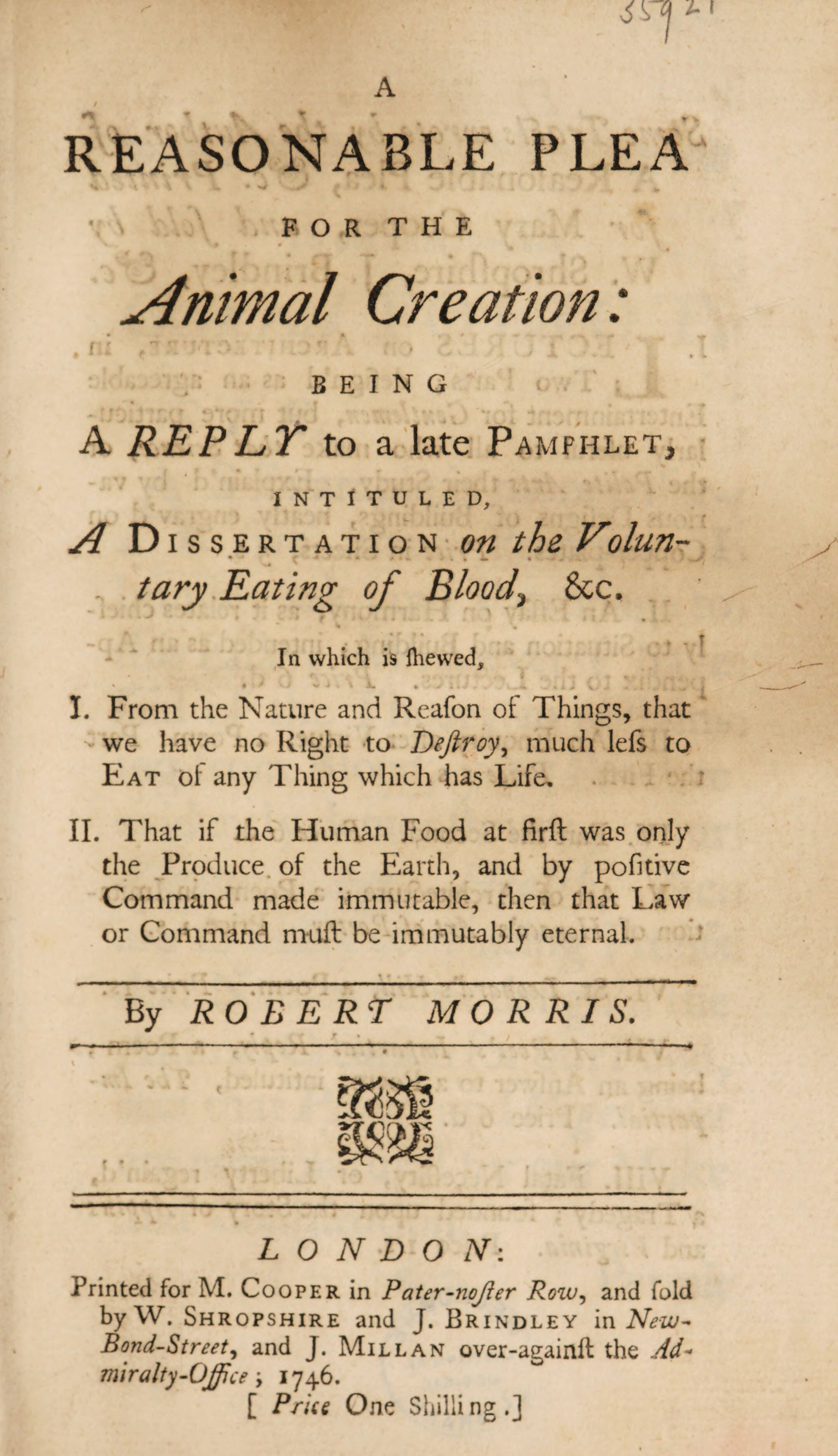
Title page of A Reasonable Plea for the Animal Creation (1746)

=== Essays and treatises ===
- An Essay in Defence of Ancient Architecture (London: D. Browne; W. Bickerton; J. Pote; J. Walthoe, 1728)
- Lectures on Architecture (London: J. Brindley, 1734–1736)
- An Essay on Harmony. As it Relates Chiefly to Situation and Building (London: T. Cooper, 1739)
- The Art of Architecture, a Poem. In Imitation of Horace's 'Art of Poetry' (London: R. Dodsley, 1742; also attributed to John Gwynn)
- A Reasonable Plea for the Animal Creation (London: M. Cooper, 1746)
- The Qualifications and Duty of a Surveyor (London: W. Owen, 1752)
- A Second Letter on the Qualifications and Duty of a Surveyor (1752)

=== Pattern books ===
- Rural Architecture (London: self-published, 1750); retitled Select Architecture in later editions
- The Architectural Remembrancer (London: self-published, 1751); retitled Architecture Improved in later editions
- Select Architecture: Being Regular Designs of Plans and Elevations Well Suited to Both Town and Country (London: self-published, 1757; expanded edition)

=== Poetical and anonymous works ===
- An Enquiry After Virtue: In a Letter to a Friend (1740)
- Yes, They Are (London, 1740)
- Have at You All (1740)
- Rupert to Maria: An Heroic Epistle (1748)
- Fatal Necessity; or Liberty Regain'd (Dublin, 1742; attributed)

== See also ==
- History of vegetarianism
- Vegetarianism in the Romantic Era
- Vegetarianism in the United Kingdom
