= John Oswald (revolutionary) =

Scottish philosopher and revolutionary (c. 1760–1793)

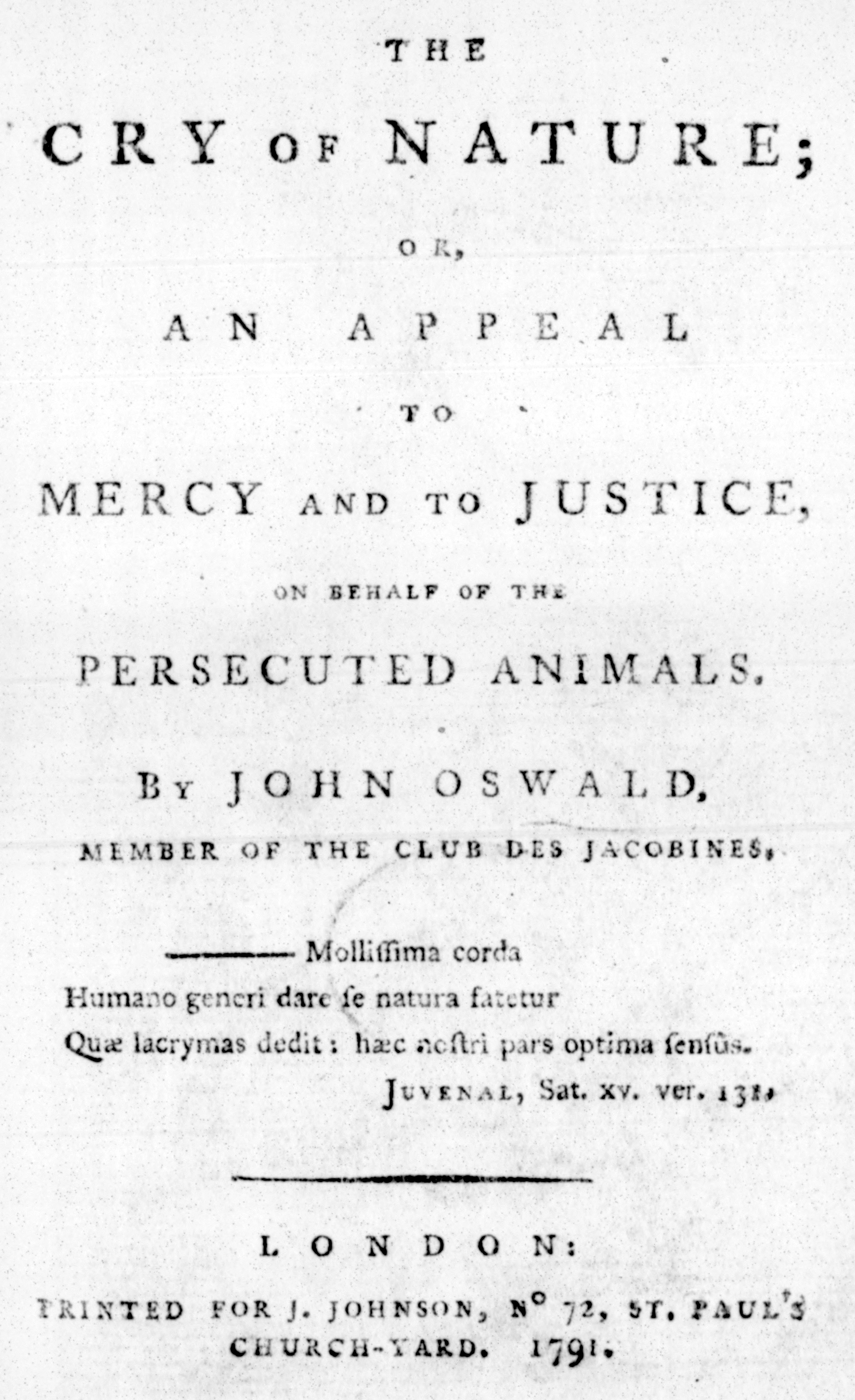
- Title page of The Cry of Nature
- Born: c. 1760; Edinburgh, Scotland
- Died: 14 September 1793 (aged 33); Thouars, Deux-Sèvres, France
- Other names: Ignotus; Sylvester Otway; H. K.
- Occupations: Philosopher; writer; soldier; revolutionary
- Notable work: The Cry of Nature (1791)
- Spouses: Louisa (died before 1784); Bathsheba Fagge Owen (m. 1784)
- Children: 4
- Military career
- Allegiance: Great Britain; France
- Branch: British Army (1776/1777–1783); French Revolutionary Army (1792–1793)
- Rank: Lieutenant (British Army)
- Units: 18th Regiment of Foot; 42nd Regiment of Foot
- Commands: Parisian battalion of pikemen (1793)
- Conflicts: American Revolutionary War; Second Anglo-Mysore War; War in the Vendée; Battle of Vrines †

John Oswald (c. 1760 – 14 September 1793) was a Scottish philosopher, writer, soldier, and revolutionary. After serving in the British Army, he became involved in radical literary and political circles in London and Paris. He advocated republicanism and direct democracy, opposed hereditary privilege, and wrote on atheism, animal rights, and vegetarianism.

During his military service in India, Oswald encountered Hindu vegetarianism and adopted a vegetarian diet. His best-known work, The Cry of Nature; or, an Appeal to Mercy and Justice on Behalf of the Persecuted Animals (1791), argued against killing animals for food and defended their moral standing. His writings connected compassion for animals with opposition to political oppression.

Oswald became involved in the French Revolution, joined the Jacobin Club, and helped found the journal Chronique du Mois and the British Club in Paris. He proposed a constitution for a universal republic based on popular assemblies and, in 1793, advocated a French invasion of Britain to overthrow the monarchy. He subsequently commanded a battalion in the French Revolutionary Army and was killed during the War in the Vendée in September 1793.

== Biography ==
=== Early life ===
Oswald was born in Edinburgh around 1760. (Note: Some earlier sources, including Henry S. Salt and Howard Williams, give his birth year as 1730. His rediscovered death certificate records his age as 33 at death, placing his birth around 1760.) Contemporary sources differ on his family background. According to one account, his father, also named John Oswald, was a goldsmith of considerable learning who operated a coffee house in Edinburgh. Another account states that his mother kept "John's Coffee-house".

Oswald was apprenticed to a goldsmith or jeweller. He learned Latin and Greek at a young age and later acquired knowledge of Arabic, French, Italian, Spanish, and Portuguese.

Accounts of his early military career vary. According to one version, he enlisted as a private in the 18th Regiment of Foot around 1776 or 1777, was promoted to sergeant because of his education, and later used money, either from a legacy or a marriage dowry, to purchase his discharge and a commission as an ensign in the 42nd Regiment of Foot.

He briefly served during the American Revolutionary War and, in 1780, was commissioned as a lieutenant in the newly raised second battalion of the 42nd Foot, which was then sent to India to fight in the Second Anglo-Mysore War. Before departing, he married his first wife, Louisa, with whom he had two sons.

=== India (1780–1783) ===
During the voyage to India, Oswald reportedly fought a duel with Colonel Norman Macleod. Although Oswald was not the instigator, the two men exchanged two shots without injury.

After arriving in India, Oswald did not dine with the officers' mess because of limited personal funds and instead lived on the standard rations issued to enlisted soldiers. He served in the Second Anglo-Mysore War. While in India, he began to express doubts about his military role and about colonialism.

Marguerite M. Regan attributes Oswald's changing views to his low social position among fellow officers and his appreciation of the local cultures he encountered in India, which she writes led him to reflect critically on colonialism. Through contact with Indian cultures, Oswald was introduced to vegetarianism and adopted it. He eventually resigned his commission and left the British Army.

=== Return to Britain (1783–1790) ===
Oswald returned overland to Britain in 1783. His first wife having died, he married Bathsheba Fagge Owen (bapt. 1759) in 1784; they had a daughter, Jane, and an infant son.

During the 1780s, Oswald moved to London and was active in literary and political circles. He worked on the Political Herald and Review under the pseudonym Ignotus, and co-published The British Mercury with James Ridgway, which featured illustrations by James Gillray and Thomas Rowlandson. He also reported parliamentary debates for the London Gazetteer and took part in public lectures and debates, including at the Society of Free Debate in 1790.

Writing under the pseudonym Sylvester Otway, he published poetry and political pamphlets, including Review of the Constitution of Great Britain (traditionally dated 1784), (Note: The publication history of Review of the Constitution of Great Britain is uncertain. Thomas Finlayson Henderson dated its first edition to 1784, whereas historian John Dinwiddy dated its composition to 1790, referring to the advertisement in the third edition (1792).) Ranae Comicae Evangelizantes (1786), Euphrosyne; or, An Ode to Beauty (1788), and The Cry of Nature; or, an Appeal to Mercy and Justice on Behalf of the Persecuted Animals (1791). By this time, he was associated with figures including Thomas Paine, John Horne Tooke, and James Mackintosh, and was known for his revolutionary sympathies in England and France. His 1793 work Constitution for the Universal Commonwealth was circulated alongside writings by Paine, Sieyès, and Mirabeau.

=== The Cry of Nature ===
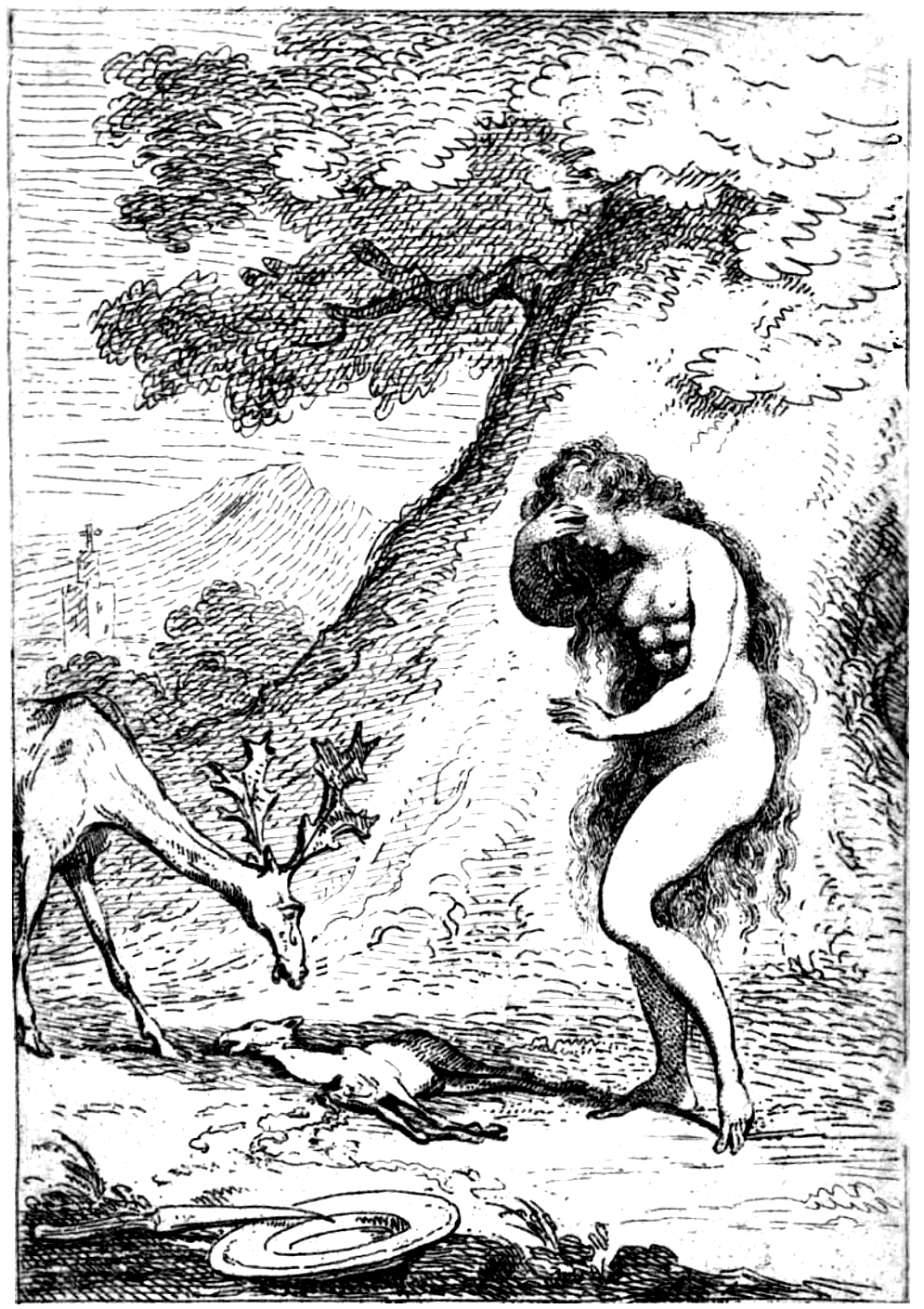
Frontispiece of The Cry of Nature (1791)

Oswald's encounter with Hindu vegetarianism during his time in India influenced his 1791 work, The Cry of Nature; or, an Appeal to Mercy and Justice on Behalf of the Persecuted Animals. He had previously argued that humans were naturally suited to a vegetable diet in The British Mercury. A historical overview by Indira Nathan, Frances Robinson, Lynne Burgess, and Allan Hackett describes the book as a contribution to the development of vegetarian thought in the Western tradition.

In the book, Oswald argued that modern society was at odds with innate human nature, in a way comparable to arguments made by Jean-Jacques Rousseau. He maintained that humans possess a natural disposition toward mercy and compassion, especially toward animals. Oswald suggested that vegetarianism would be more widely adopted if people were required to witness or carry out the killing of animals themselves. He argued that the division of labour allowed people to consume meat while remaining detached from its ethical consequences, and that social conditioning weakened natural sympathetic responses. Although Oswald promoted compassion and practised vegetarianism, Peter Marshall notes that he did not advocate pacifism.

=== France (1790–1793) ===
==== Revolutionary activity in Paris ====
By May 1790, Oswald had settled in Paris and became involved in revolutionary politics. He attended sessions of the National Assembly and presented a patriotic ode in September that year. During this period, he came into contact with revolutionary figures including Thomas Cooper, Wolfe Tone, Camille Desmoulins, Georges Danton, and Théroigne de Méricourt.

Contemporary descriptions of Oswald state that he was of average or middle height but had a commanding or noble presence. In Paris, he was said to affect a Roman style of dress, with an open collar and hair styled à la Brutus. One account described him as having a "heroic and grave face, sober manners and [being] a bit stiff".

==== Journalism and political involvement ====
In 1791, Oswald helped found the journal Chronique du Mois, which he co-edited with Nicholas Bonneville until late 1792. He also contributed to the Cercle social, a reformist intellectual circle that included Brissot and Condorcet. In 1791, he published an article in Bonneville's newspaper La Bouche de fer, signing it "Franc-anglois". He worked briefly on the English-language newspaper Universal Patriot, which reported on political developments in Britain and France.

By 1791, Oswald was a member of the Jacobin Club, as stated on the title page of The Cry of Nature. In 1792, a third English-language edition of Review of the Constitution of Great Britain appeared with substantial additions. In October that year, an attempt to import 1,000 copies from France into Britain ended in their confiscation after the Earl Camden called Oswald "a most wicked and unprincipled incendiary" and his work "diabolical".

In January 1793, Oswald helped found the British Club in Paris, a group of British expatriates supporting the French Revolution, and served as its secretary. He addressed the Jacobin Club on several occasions, published La tactique du peuple, and produced a subsidised English translation of Collot d'Herbois's Almanach des père Gérard.

In early 1793, Oswald presented a plan for a French invasion of northern England. In a speech to the Jacobin Club on 4 February, he proposed encouraging British officers and sailors to join the revolutionary cause, organising an insurrection in London, and sending 60,000 French revolutionaries to march on the capital in support of the uprising. He predicted that the British monarchy could be overthrown within three months and envisaged France and England forming a single republic.

==== French military service and death ====
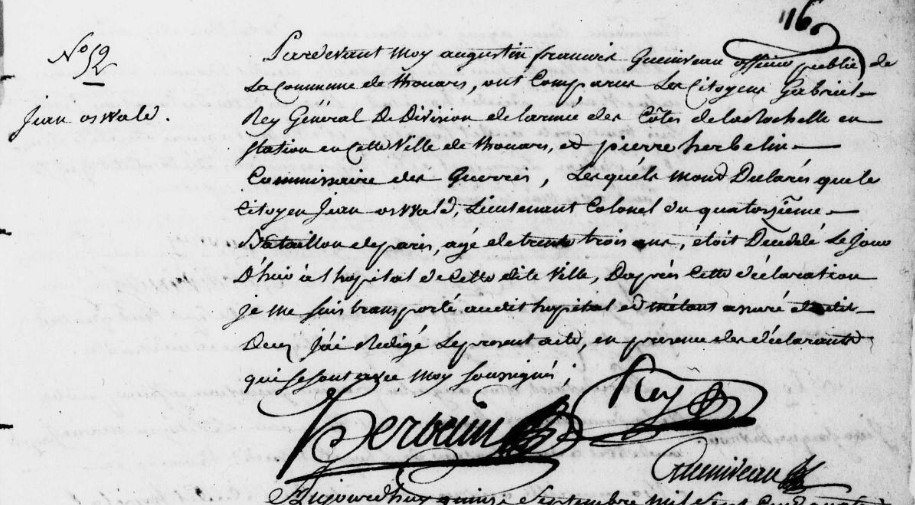
Oswald's death certificate

In September 1792, Jacques Pierre Brissot proposed granting Oswald French citizenship, but the proposal was not adopted. Oswald subsequently commanded a battalion in the French Revolutionary Army. His two sons joined him as drummers. Oswald's strict discipline made him unpopular among his troops, and his attempt to replace muskets with specially designed pikes met resistance, with soldiers reportedly refusing to train with them.

In May 1793, he took command of the Parisian battalion of pikemen, later designated the 14th battalion of Paris, and joined the fighting in the War in the Vendée. Although his death had previously been attributed to either Les Ponts-de-Cé or Thouars, official records confirm that he died at Thouars on 14 September 1793. His death certificate, filed under the name "Jean Oswale" by Major General Gabriel Rey, lists his age as 33. A military report dated 24 September 1793 listed Oswald among four men killed in the fighting, described him as brave, and stated that he had two children.

The exact circumstances of his death remain uncertain. He was probably killed at the Battle of Vrines, also known as the Second Battle of Thouars, on 14 September 1793, during fighting between Republican forces and Vendéen troops led by Louis Marie de Lescure. Accounts differ on the fate of his sons, with some reporting that they were killed alongside him and others stating that they were wounded but survived.

Accounts also differ on how Oswald died. One states that he was killed by a cannonball and his sons by grapeshot; another that he and one of his sons were shot while attempting to rally their retreating battalion under heavy fire; and a third suggests that disgruntled soldiers may have killed Oswald, his sons, and another English officer because of his unpopularity.

== Philosophy ==
=== Political thought ===
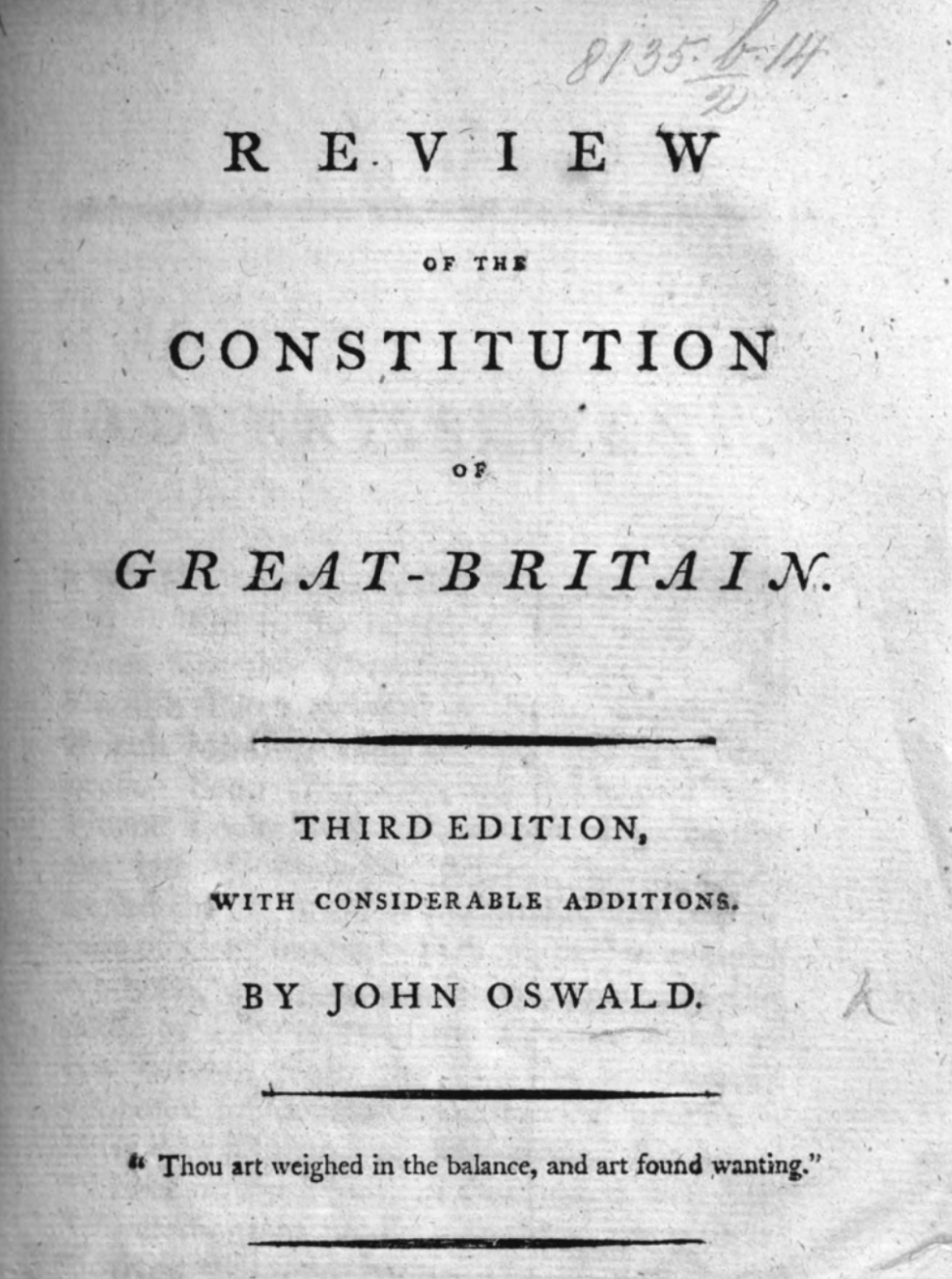
Third edition title page of Review of the Constitution of Great Britain (1793)

Oswald's political thought has been described as drawing on the Scottish Enlightenment, radical egalitarianism, and classical republicanism. Anna Plassart describes him as a lesser-known figure among British supporters of the French Revolution and discusses his contributions to debates on commerce, property, and democratic government.

Oswald drew on the ideas of writers including David Hume, Adam Smith, and Adam Ferguson, particularly in his writings for the Political Herald and Review and The British Mercury. He adopted the four stages theory of social development and praised the social benefits of commerce, while criticising hereditary privilege and advocating direct democracy and civic virtue. His Review of the Constitution of Great Britain opposed representative government and promoted legislation by popular acclamation. In the same work, he argued that parliamentary reform would not remedy the defects of British government and called for a National Assembly.

Oswald also criticised the concentration of property and defended the idea of land as a common inheritance, influenced by William Ogilvie. His final political text, Le gouvernement du peuple (1793), proposed a universal republic based on decentralised cantonal assemblies and mass approval of laws.

His political and military thought were closely linked. Concerned that modern commercial societies might lose their capacity for self-defence, he advocated a citizen militia and published La tactique du peuple (1792), a manual promoting military training for the people without reliance on standing armies. Plassart writes that these ideas combined elements of classical civic humanism with Enlightenment-era commercial republicanism.

=== Animal rights and vegetarianism ===
In The Cry of Nature, Oswald rejected the traditional human-animal hierarchy and argued for the moral standing of non-human animals. Sarah R. Cohen, reviewing Stephen F. Eisenman's The Cry of Nature: Art and the Making of Animal Rights, writes that Oswald's work challenged human dominion and presented animals as moral subjects. Oswald argued that hunting was morally indefensible, that killing animals for food was unnecessary, and that animals possess feelings and rights.

Regan argues that Oswald treated vegetarianism as a form of political resistance. In The Cry of Nature, he connected abstention from meat with opposition to tyranny and brutality, linking compassion for animals with democratic revolution. Historian Erica J. Mannucci likewise describes the work as a moral and political argument, relating its appeal for justice towards animals to Oswald's republicanism.

Oswald practised vegetarianism in daily life. According to one account, he lived on fruits and fruit juices, and when dining in company would eat only potatoes, leaving the meat untouched.

=== Religious views ===
Oswald was an atheist, a position reflected in his writings and noted by contemporaries such as Henry Redhead Yorke. In his 1786 satirical pamphlet Ranae Comicae Evangelizantes; or, The Comic Frogs Turned Methodist, he criticised religious enthusiasm and mocked Methodist preachers.

Oswald reiterated his irreligious views while living in revolutionary France. In Le gouvernement du peuple (1793), he argued against the role of religion in public life and government, described Christianity as an "imposture", and advanced arguments associated with radical Enlightenment secularism. Although exposed to Hinduism during his military service in India, he rejected its theological claims, including reincarnation.

== Reception ==
Oswald received some recognition during his lifetime. He was included in Francis Marshall's Catalogue of Five Hundred Celebrated Authors of Great Britain, Now Living (1788), which described him in a fourteen-line entry.

His political views attracted both support and criticism. He was attacked in the British press as a dangerous Jacobin. In March 1793, Edmund Burke cited Oswald's Constitution for the Universal Commonwealth in the House of Commons, presenting it as an example of radical democratic thought. In England, his name became associated with violent republicanism; in France, he was part of the expatriate British revolutionary network, though not fully assimilated into it.

Oswald's name later appeared in literary contexts. William Wordsworth used the name "Oswald" for the antagonist in his play The Borderers, written between 1795 and 1797 and published in 1842, though it is unclear whether this was intended as a direct reference to John Oswald.

George Nicholson reproduced passages from The Cry of Nature in On the Primeval Diet of Man (1801). Joseph Ritson also discussed Oswald's life and vegetarian diet in An Essay on Abstinence from Animal Food, as a Moral Duty (1802), although he did not cite Oswald's published writings.

Oswald's service in the French Revolutionary Army attracted attention in Britain. At one point, the Scottish author William Thomson proposed an unsupported theory that Oswald and Napoleon Bonaparte were the same person, citing similarities in character and interests. The claim was dismissed after General Pasquale Paoli affirmed his personal knowledge of Bonaparte's early life, including having acted as his godfather.

== Later assessment ==
In the 19th century, Oswald was portrayed as a precursor to socialism and utopian thought, including by André Lichtenberger. In the 20th and 21st centuries, scholars including David V. Erdman and Anna Plassart have reassessed his work, especially his combination of Scottish Enlightenment ideas with radical political practice.

According to Cohen's review of Eisenman's The Cry of Nature: Art and the Making of Animal Rights, Eisenman treats Oswald's work as part of the development of modern animal rights thought, because it calls for animals to be recognised as sentient beings with agency rather than as objects of human compassion or utility.

In 1996, Éditions de la passion published a collection of Oswald's short texts under the title Le gouvernement du peuple : Plan de constitution pour la république universelle.

In 2022, French researcher Frédéric Augris confirmed the location of Oswald's death by finding his death certificate in the civil records of Thouars. Earlier biographers had debated whether Oswald died at Thouars or Les Ponts-de-Cé during the War in the Vendée. The certificate, found by Augris while examining archival records from communes in northern Deux-Sèvres, places his death in Thouars on 14 September 1793.

== Publications ==
- Review of the Constitution of Great Britain (traditionally dated London, 1784; third edition, 1792)
- Ranae Comicae Evangelizantes: Or, The Comic Frogs Turned Methodist (as Sylvester Otway; London: Mucklow, 1786)
- The British Mercury (also served as editor; London: J. Ridgway; L. Macdonald, established 1787), contributed essays, articles, and satirical short stories, including "The Brain-Sucker: Or, the Distress of Authorship"
- The Alarming Progress of French Politics: A Pamphlet on the Commercial Treaty (London: Jameson, 1787)
- Euphrosyne; or, An Ode to Beauty (as Sylvester Otway; addressed to Mrs Crouch of Drury Lane Theatre; London, 1788)
- Poems, to Which Is Added "The Humours of John Bull", an Operatic Farce; in Two Acts (as Sylvester Otway; London: Murray, 1789)
- The Cry of Nature; or, An Appeal to Mercy and Justice on Behalf of the Persecuted Animals (London: J. Johnson, 1791)
- Chronique du Mois (co-editor with Nicolas Bonneville; 1791–1793)
- La tactique du peuple; ou, Nouveau principe pour les évolutions militaires, par lequel le peuple peut facilement apprendre à combattre par lui-même et pour lui-même, sans le secours dangereux des troupes réglées ("The Tactics of the People; or, A New Principle for Military Manoeuvres, by Which the People Can Easily Learn to Fight by Themselves and for Themselves, Without the Dangerous Aid of Regular Troops"; Paris: Gueffier, c. 1790s)
- The Government of the People; or, A Sketch of a Constitution for the Universal Commonwealth (Paris: The English Press, 1792). Translated and published as Le gouvernement du peuple, ou Plan de constitution pour la République universelle in 1793. Also translated into Dutch as De volksregering, of oprichtingsplan voor de universele republiek

== See also ==
- Vegetarianism in the Romantic era
- Robert Pigott (radical) – English radical and vegetarian who supported the French Revolution
- A Vindication of Natural Diet – 1813 pamphlet by Percy Bysshe Shelley advocating vegetarianism
