= The Medical Times and Gazette =

- Discipline: General medical
- Language: English

Publication details
- History: 1852–1885

Standard abbreviations
- ISO 4: Med. Times Gaz.

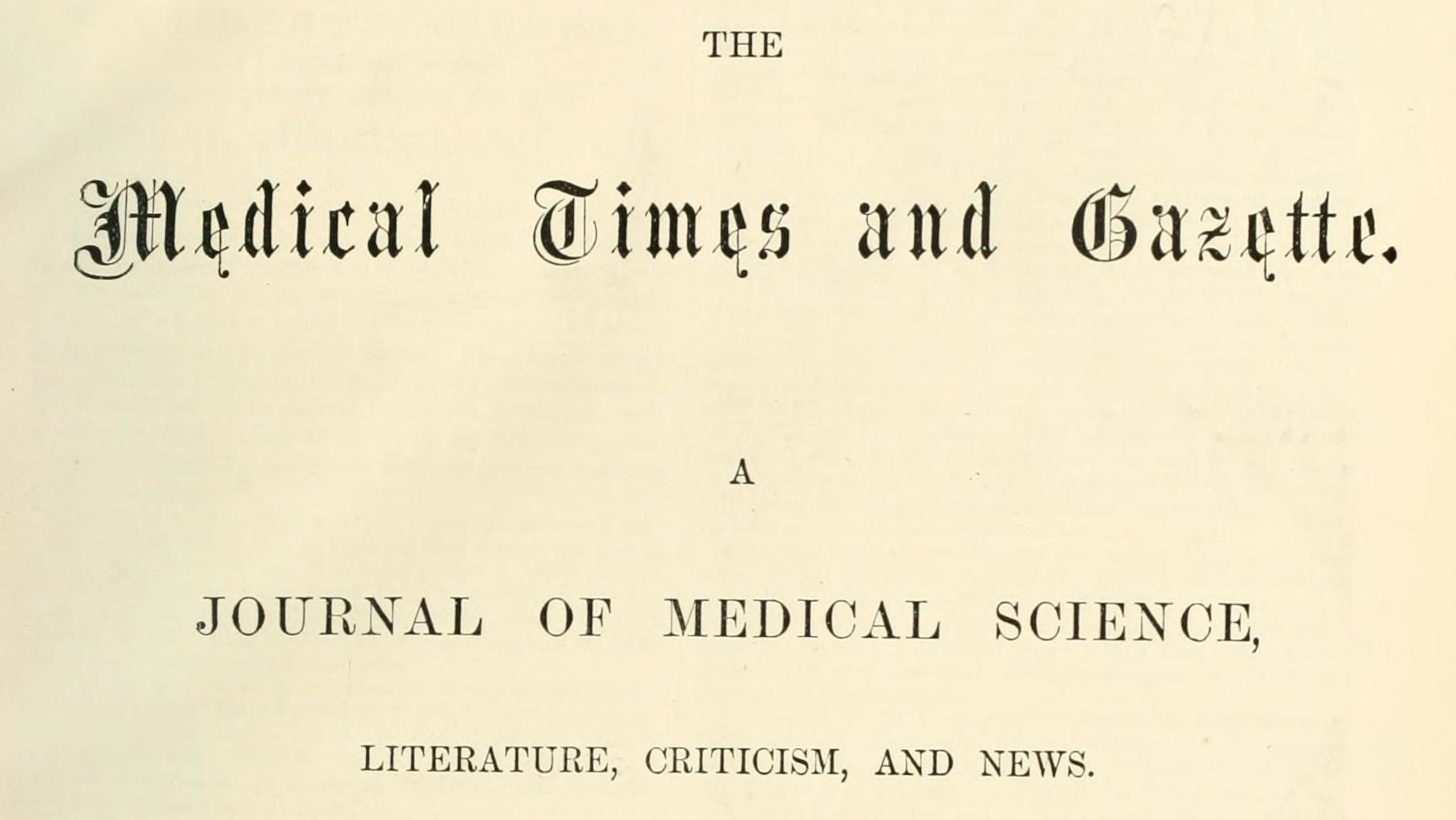
Title page of The Medical Times and Gazette journal

The Medical Times and Gazette was one of the principal medical journals of 19th century Britain.

The paper was established in January 1852, and ceased publishing in December 1885. It incorporated the earlier Medical Times and the London Medical Gazette, and was also known as the London Medical Times and Gazette.

== See also ==
- British Medical Journal
