= Gloucestershire Royal Infirmary =

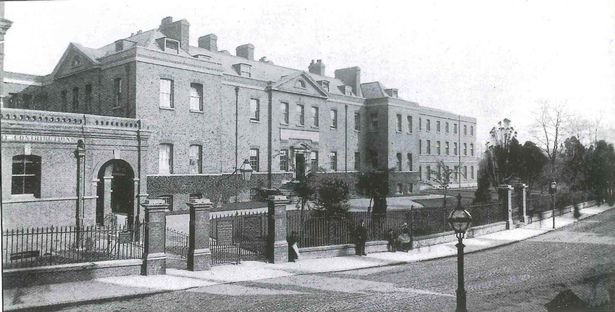
- Gloucestershire Royal Infirmary

- Shown in Gloucestershire

Geography
- Location: Gloucester, United Kingdom
- Coordinates: 51.8622°N 2.2509°W

Organisation
- Care system: Public NHS
- Type: General

History
- Founded: 1755
- Closed: 1984

Links
- Lists: Hospitals in the United Kingdom

The Gloucestershire Royal Infirmary was a hospital in Southgate Street, Gloucester.

== History ==
The hospital was originally established at a public house in Westgate Street 1755 but moved to more permanent premises, which were designed by Luke Singleton and erected in Southgate Street, as the Gloucestershire General Infirmary in 1756. The Infirmary merged with the Gloucestershire Eye Institution in 1878 and, with the permission of King Edward VII, the combined facility became the Gloucestershire Royal Infirmary and Eye Institution in 1909.

On the introduction of the National Health Service in 1948 it was amalgamated with the Gloucester City General Hospital. Queen Elizabeth II, accompanied by Duke of Edinburgh, paid a visit to the hospital during a visit to the city on 3 May 1955. The hospital in Southgate Street closed to in-patients in 1975 and to out-patients in the early 1980s. It was demolished in 1984 and replaced by offices known as Southgate House.

== Notable staff ==
A number of matrons at Gloucestershire Royal Infirmary, and its predecessor hospital were trained or worked at The London Hospital under Eva Luckes.

- Elizabeth Yeats (1847–1928), Matron, from 1887 to 1904. Yeats trained at The Nightingale School at St Thomas's Hospital, London. Yeats then worked as a sister at Shadwell Infirmary and Manchester Infirmary before working at The London for six years between 1881 and 1887. Yeats was also Matron of Gloucester Isolation Hospital, 'Over Hospital', Gloucestershire from November 1904 until she retired in 1905. Following her death a tablet in her memory was erected in the hospital chapel by her former colleagues in 1929.
- Gertrude M. Carrick (1878– ), Assistant Matron from 1917 to 1919. She trained at The London between 1903 and 1905.
- Florence Mary Tillson (1875–1964), Matron, 1917 until about 1922. She also trained at The London between 1903 and 1905.
