= Stephen F. Eisenman =

American art historian

Stephen F. Eisenman is an American art historian, professor emeritus of art history at Northwestern University in Evanston, Illinois and an Honorary Research Fellow at the University of East Anglia.

== Career ==
Eisenman is the author of nine books including Gauguin's Skirt (1997), The Abu Ghraib Effect (2007), and The Cry of Nature – Art and the Making of Animal Rights (2013). His Gauguin’s Skirt ignited an international, scholarly debate about Gauguin’s entanglement or repudiation of French imperialism and racism in the Pacific. He has curated major exhibitions in the United States and Europe and is the principal author and editor of the textbook Nineteenth Century Art: A Critical History (fourth edition 2010).

Eisenman is also an activist: From 2008 to 2013, he was spokesman for the prison reform organization, Tamms Year Ten which in 2013 succeeded in closing Illinois’ only supermax prison. In 2017, he founded a 501c3 nonprofit, Anthropocene Alliance with his wife, the British environmentalist, Harriet Festing. He has twice been elected President of the Northwestern University Faculty Senate.

Eisenman is the principal author and editor of Nineteenth Century Art: A Critical Edition (fourth edition 2010). Eisenman has curated numerous exhibitions in the United States and Europe, including Paul Gauguin - Artist of Myth and Dream (2007), Design in the Age of Darwin (2008), and The Ecology of Impressionism (2010). The catalog for his exhibition, William Blake in the Age of Aquarius Northwestern's Block Museum (September 2017 to March 2018) was among The New York Times' The Best Art Books of 2017.

His article "The Intransigent Artist, Or How the Impressionists Got Their Name", published in the catalogue for the exhibition, The New Painting, Impressionism, Fine Arts Museums of San Francisco, 1986, is frequently cited and has twice been anthologized. Since 2020, Eisenman has been a regular contributor to the radical, online magazine, Counterpunch. His 175 plus columns (as of January 2026) range from politics, and the environment, to art, film, music, and literature.

== Selected publications ==
- (with Sue Coe), The Young Person’s Illustrated Guide to American Fascism (OR Books, 2024)
- (with Sue Coe), Zooicide; Seeing Cruelty, Demanding Abolition (AK Press, 2018)
- The Ghosts of Our Meat (New York: DAP, 2014)
- The Cry of Nature – Art and the Making of Animal Rights (London: Reaktion, 2013)
- Nineteenth-Century Art: A Critical History revised and expanded Fourth Edition), (London and New York: Thames and Hudson, 2010)
- Paul Gauguin (Barcelona: Poligrapha, 2010)
- The Ecology of Impressionism (Milan: Skira, 2010)
- Design in the Age of Darwin: From William Morris to Frank Lloyd Wright (Evanston: Northwestern University Press, 2008)
- Paul Gauguin: Artist of Myth and Dream (Milan: Skira, 2007)
- The Abu Ghraib Effect (London: Reaktion Books; Chicago: University of Chicago Press, 2007. Turkish Edition, 2008; Revised Spanish Edition, 2014)
- (with Richard Brettell), Nineteenth-Century Art in the Norton Simon Museum of Art, (London and New Haven: Yale University Press, 2006)
- Gauguin’s Skirt (London and New York: Thames and Hudson, 1997. Paperback, 1999)
- The Temptation of Saint Redon — Biography, Ideology and Style in the Noirs of Odilon Redon (Chicago: University of Chicago Press, 1992)
