= George Nicholson (printer) =

English printer, writer, and social reformer (1760–1825)

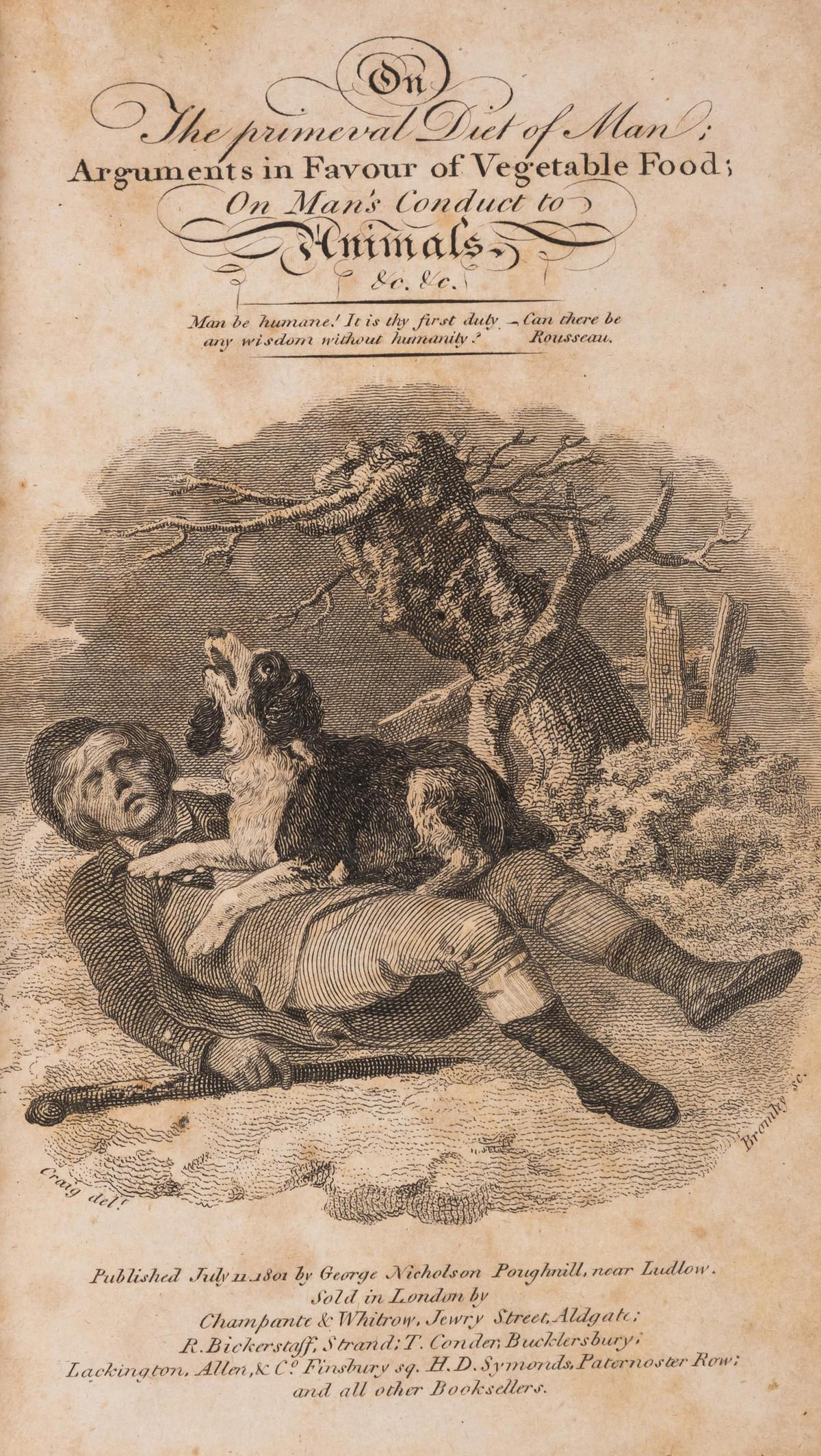
- First edition title page of On the Primeval Diet of Man (1801)
- Born: 1760; Keighley, West Riding of Yorkshire, England
- Died: 1 November 1825 (aged 65); Stourport-on-Severn, Worcestershire, England
- Occupations: Printer; writer; social reformer
- Notable work: On the Conduct of Man to Inferior Animals (1797); On the Primeval Diet of Man (1801)
- Spouse: Mary Nicholson

George Nicholson (1760 – 1 November 1825) was an English printer, writer, and social reformer. He wrote on vegetarianism, animal welfare, women's rights and the abolition of slavery. His works included On the Conduct of Man to Inferior Animals (1797), later expanded as On the Primeval Diet of Man: Arguments in Favour of Vegetable Food: On Man's Conduct to Animals &c. &c. (1801).

== Life and career ==
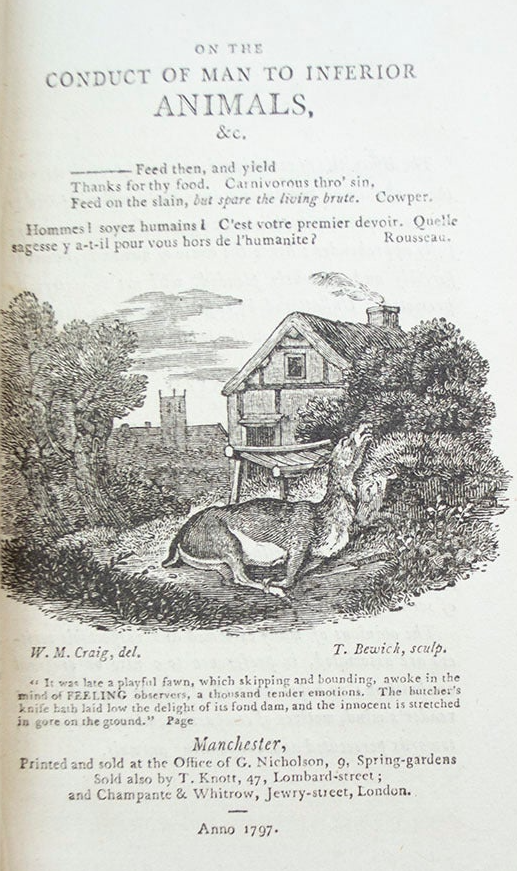
Title page of On the Conduct of Man to Inferior Animals (1797)

Nicholson was born in 1760 in Keighley, West Riding of Yorkshire, the son of the bookseller John Nicholson. The family moved to Bradford in 1781.

Nicholson started a printing business with his brother and in 1797 they moved the business to Manchester. Their publications included Pious Reflections for Every Day of the Month; Translated from the French of Fénelon by John Clowes and Nicholson's On the Conduct of Man to Inferior Animals.

Rachel Prescott published a book of poetry in 1799 which was dedicated to Nicholson. Her dedication referred to his "congeniality of mind, and on principles which can experience neither alloy nor decay".

Nicholson settled in Stourport-on-Severn, Worcestershire, in 1808, where he remained for the rest of his life. His printing press was at 15 Bridge Street; the premises are now a listed building.

Nicholson also supported animal welfare, women's rights and the abolition of slavery.

Nicholson died in Stourport on 1 November 1825, aged 65. After his death, his widow Mary Nicholson announced in that she intended to continue his printing and bookselling business in Stourport.

== Vegetarianism ==
Nicholson was a vegetarian. He wrote On the Conduct of Man to Inferior Animals in 1797 and expanded it as On the Primeval Diet of Man: Arguments in Favour of Vegetable Food: On Man's Conduct to Animals &c. &c. in 1801. Nicholson cited writers including Porphyry, Plutarch, Erasmus Darwin, and John Arbuthnot. A supplement, On Food, was added to the 1803 edition and included vegetarian recipes. The book was republished by Edwin Mellen Press in 2000, with an introduction and notes by historian Rod Preece.

Nicholson argued that the earliest humans ate a vegetarian diet and that this diet should be followed for reasons of health and morality. He also argued that human treatment of animals was often unjust, that recognition of similarities between humans and other species should lead to more respectful treatment of animals, and that animals should receive education-based and legal protection.

== Selected publications ==
- On the Conduct of Man to Inferior Animals. Manchester: George Nicholson. 1797.
- The Primeval Diet of Man: Arguments in Favour of Vegetable Food: On Man's Conduct to Animals &c. &c. Poughnhill: George Nicholson. 1801.

== See also ==
- Animal welfare in the United Kingdom
- History of vegetarianism
- Vegetarianism in the Romantic Era
