= The Ideal Publishing Union =

British publisher (1894–1906)

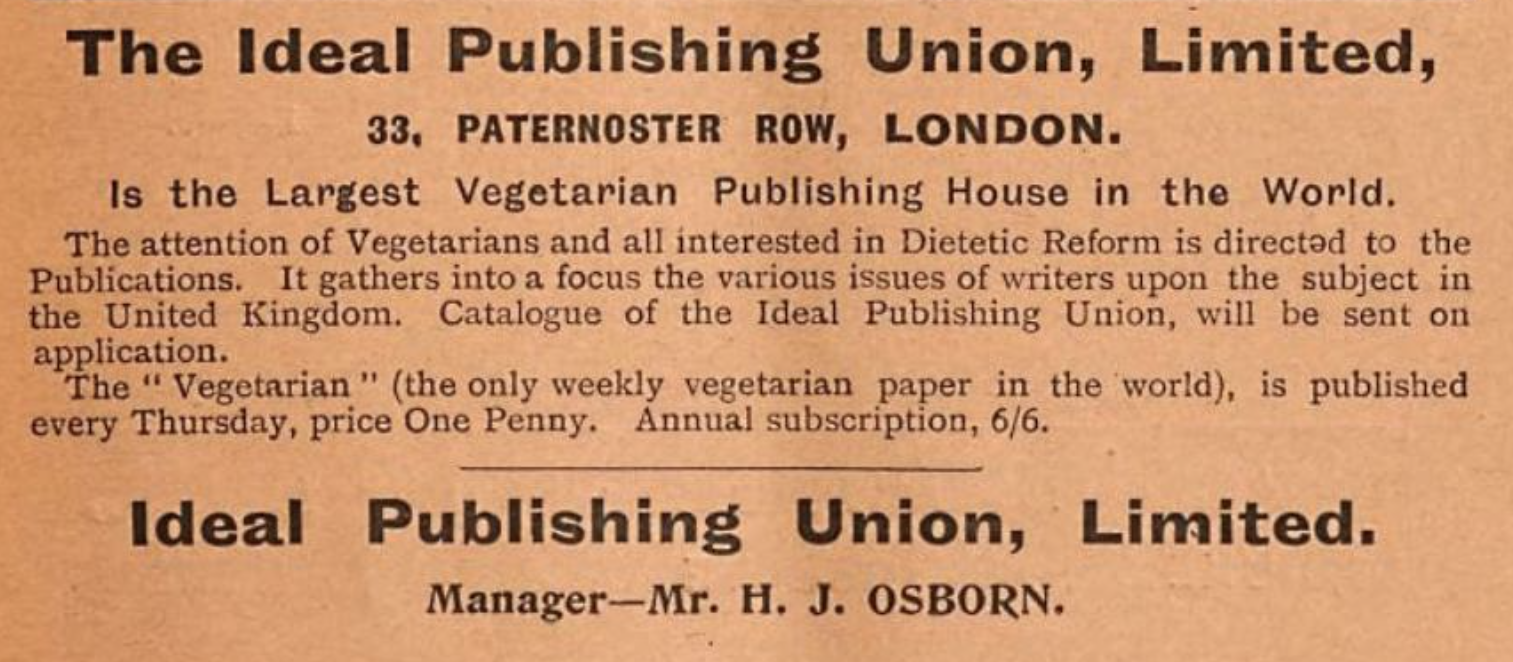
- Advertisement in The Vegetarian Messenger (1900)
- Trade name: The Ideal Publishing Union, Ltd.
- Industry: Publishing
- Genre: Temperance literature; Vegetarian literature
- Founded: February 1894; 132 years ago
- Founder: Arnold Hills
- Defunct: 16 November 1906
- Headquarters: Memorial Hall, Farringdon Street, London; 33 Paternoster Row, London
- Key people: Arnold Hills (owner and chairman); Josiah Oldfield (director); Charles W. Forward (director)

The Ideal Publishing Union was a British publisher of temperance and vegetarian literature in the late 19th and early 20th centuries. It was funded by Arnold Hills and incorporated in 1894 to acquire The Vegetarian and The Vegetarian Review. Its directors included Hills as chairman, Josiah Oldfield, and Charles W. Forward as managing director. The company was based at Memorial Hall in Farringdon Street and later at 33 Paternoster Row. It was dissolved on 16 November 1906.

== History ==
The Ideal Publishing Union was funded by the temperance and vegetarianism activist Arnold Hills. The company was first based at Memorial Hall, Farringdon Street, London, and later at 33 Paternoster Row, London.

A February 1894 notice in The Vegetarian Messenger reported that the company had been incorporated to acquire The Vegetarian, a weekly newspaper, The Vegetarian Review, a quarterly magazine, and the associated printing and publishing business. The notice also stated that it would publish The Merry-go-Round, a humorous illustrated monthly magazine. It named Hills as chairman, Josiah Oldfield as a director, and Charles W. Forward as managing director.

An 1898 notice in The Bookseller reported that the National Temperance League had transferred its interest in the depot at 33 Paternoster Row to the Ideal Publishing Union. The notice stated that the business would continue under the joint title The National Temperance Publication Depot (Ideal Publishing Union Limited), with H. J. Osborn as manager. It also stated that there would be no immediate changes to its operations, and that the existing manager, Thomas Rowe, would remain for some months.

A 1900 advertisement in The Vegetarian Messenger described it as the "Largest Vegetarian Publishing House in the World".

The company was dissolved on 16 November 1906.

== Publications ==
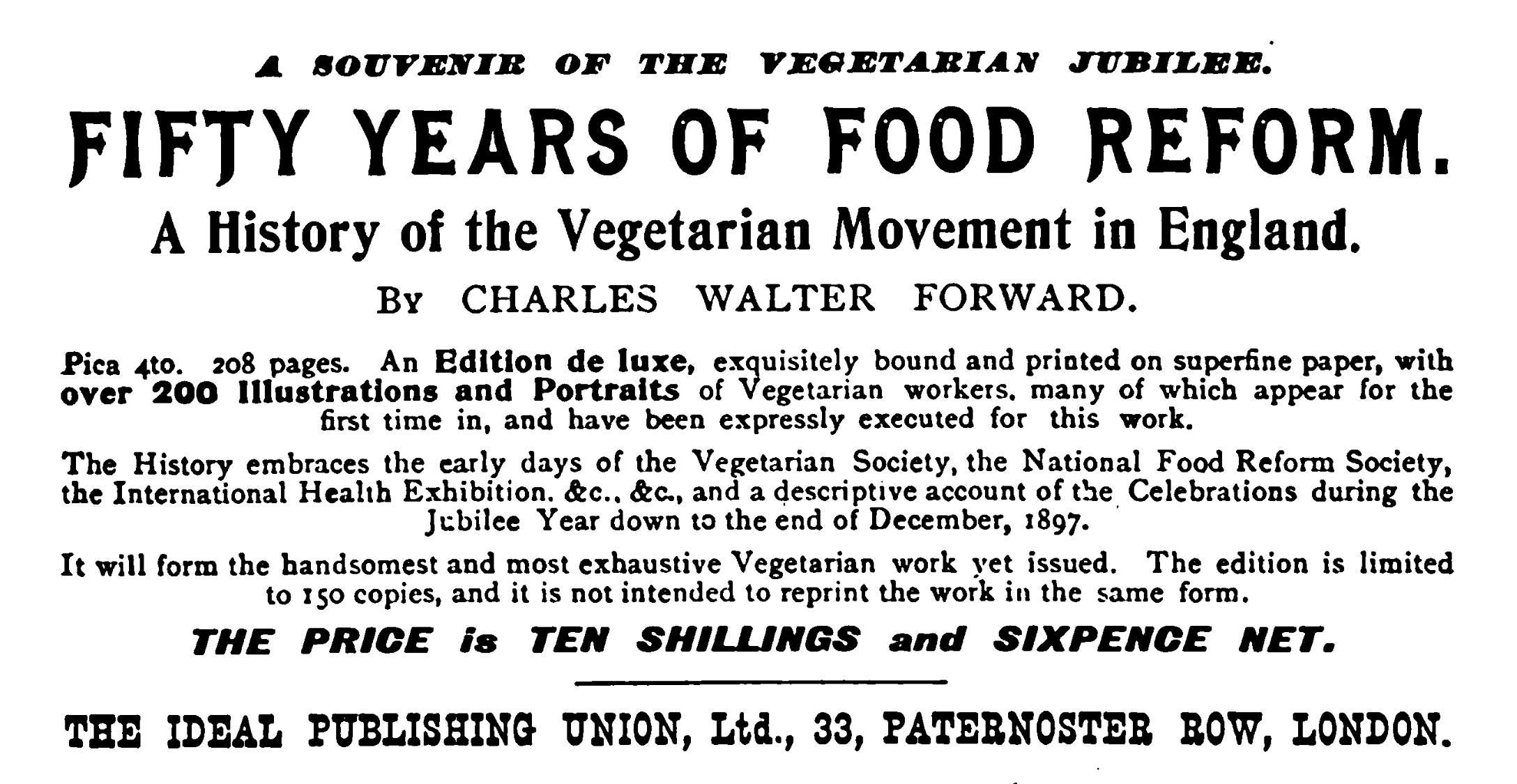
Advertisement for Fifty Years of Food Reform (1898)

The Ideal Publishing Union published temperance and vegetarian literature. Its publications included Charles W. Forward's Fifty Years of Food Reform (1898), a history of the British vegetarian movement. It also published works by the physician and reformer Josiah Oldfield.

=== Vegetarian Jubilee Library ===
Charles W. Forward edited the 12-volume Vegetarian Jubilee Library series, issued from 1897 to 1900 for the 50th anniversary of the Vegetarian Society in 1897.

1. Hills, Arnold F. (1897). Vegetarian Essays. OCLC 38857255.
2. Newton, John Frank (1897). The Return to Nature. OCLC 46486685.
3. Mayor, John E. B. (1897). Plain Living and High Thinking: Selected Addresses and Sermons. OCLC 38857284.
4. Smith, John (1897). Fruits and Farinacea: The Proper Food of Man. OCLC 2628860.
5. Gleizes, Jean Antoine (1897). Thalysie: Or the New Existence. Translated by C. H. Collyns. OCLC 267097830.
6. Tolstoy, Leo (1897). The Gospel of Humaneness. OCLC 300574590.
7. Graham, Sylvester (1897). The Physiology of Feeding: Consisting of the Three Lectures on Diet from The Science of Human Life. OCLC 63363130.
8. Forward, Charles W. (1898). Cameos of Vegetarian Literature: A Collection of Lectures and Essays on Food Reform. OCLC 915635277.
9. Kingsford, Anna Bonus (1898). The Ideal in Diet: Selections From the Writings of Anna Bonus Kingsford. OCLC 915635277.
10. Forward, Charles W. (1898). Dulce Sodalitium: A Selection of Stories and Sketches by Vegetarian Writers. OCLC 232009406.
11. Salt, Henry S. (1898). The Logic of Vegetarianism: Essays and Dialogues. OCLC 25359999.
12. Forward, Charles W. (1900). Vegetariana: A Collection of Facts and Opinions on the Subject of Food Reform.

== See also ==
- Bibliography of veganism and vegetarianism
- History of vegetarianism
- Vegetarianism in the United Kingdom
- Vegetarianism in the Victorian era
- Temperance movement in the United Kingdom
