= Thomas Holliday Barker =

English temperance and vegetarianism advocate (1818–1889)

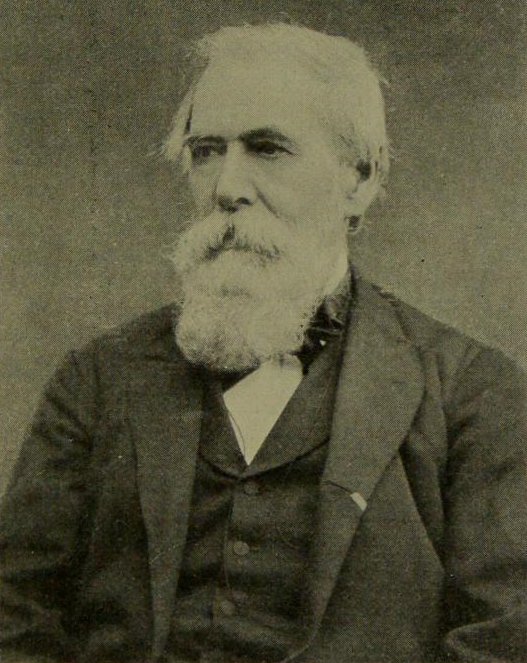
- Portrait from Fifty Years of Food Reform (1898)
- Born: 6 July 1818; Peterborough, England
- Died: 26 June 1889 (aged 70); Fallowfield, England
- Occupations: Temperance and vegetarianism advocate
- Spouse: Millicent Bates (m. 1844)
- Children: 4

Thomas Holliday Barker (6 July 1818 – 26 June 1889) was an English temperance and vegetarianism advocate. He was a founding member of the United Kingdom Alliance (UKA).

== Biography ==
Thomas Holliday Barker was born in Peterborough on 6 July 1818. As a young man he was employed as a clerk for a wine merchant. He worked for Wood & Westhead warehousemen in Manchester from 1844 to 1851. He then became an accountant and commission agent at an office on Princess Street, Manchester. Barker suffered from poor health and became a teetotaller. In 1837, he signed an abstinence pledge and became secretary of the Spalding Temperance Society.

In 1843, Barker refused to drink the fermented wine at Wesleyan chapel in Lincoln. This generated controversy, and he was disciplined by the church. As a result, he severed his connection with them. He appealed for support from Frederic Richard Lees.

Barker was a founding member of the United Kingdom Alliance (UKA) and its secretary from 1853 to 1883. He was paid £500 a year and became a well known temperance leader in Britain. He married Millicent Bates in 1844 and they had four sons.

Barker communicated with American temperance advocates such as Edward C. Delavan and Neal Dow. He was a founder of the Union and Emancipation Society. Barker was a vegetarian. In the 1850s, he served in the committee of the Manchester and Salford Vegetarian Association. He authored the vegetarian book, Thoughts, Facts and Hints on Human Dietetics. Barker was influential in converting Francis William Newman to vegetarianism. He was an early member of the Vegetarian Society. He also served as vice-president of the Society.

Barker died in Fallowfield on 26 June 1889.

== Selected publications ==
- Thoughts, Facts and Hints on Human Dietetics (1870)
