= Emil Weilshäuser =

German publisher and social reformer (1827–1917)

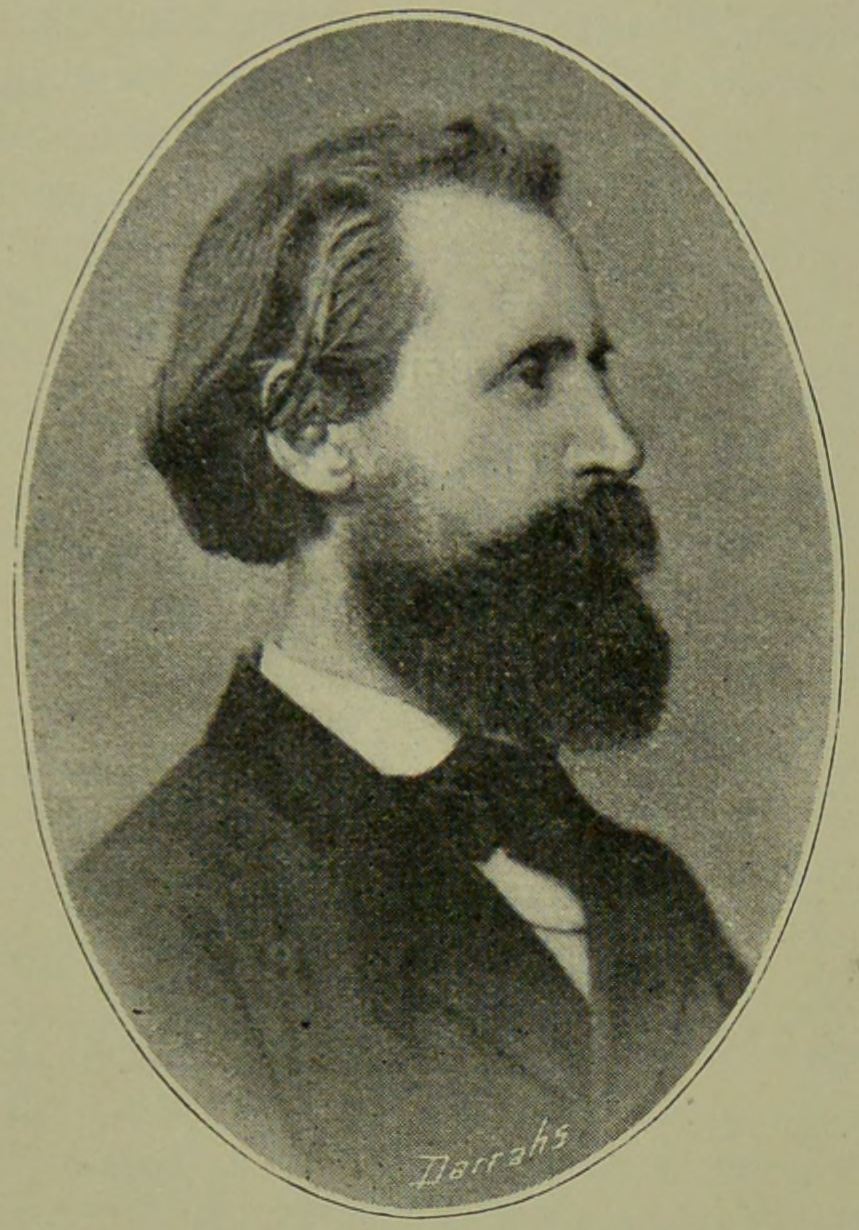
- Portrait from Fifty Years of Food Reform (1898)
- Born: Carl Emil Weilshäuser; 31 July 1827; Oppeln, Province of Silesia, Kingdom of Prussia
- Died: 7 December 1917 (aged 90); Oppeln, Province of Silesia, Kingdom of Prussia, German Empire
- Occupations: Publisher; writer; translator; social reformer
- Known for: Vegetarianism and anti-vivisection activism
- Notable work: Familienbibliothek: Gesundheit, Wohlstand, und Gluck; Vegetarisches Kochbuch (1871)

Emil Weilshäuser (Note: His surname has variously been spelled as Weilshauser or Weilshaeuser.) (31 July 1827 – 7 December 1917) was a German publisher, writer, translator, and social reformer. He was active in the early German vegetarian and anti-vivisection movements, and published and translated English-language works on vegetarianism into German. He also wrote several works on the subject, including a vegetarian cookbook that went through several editions. Weilshäuser was president of the Vegetarian Society of Germany from 1882 to 1885, and was a member of the British Vegetarian Society and the Victoria Street and International Anti-Vivisection Society. He also advocated for women in medicine and was associated with the Lebensreform movement.

== Biography ==
=== Early life and education ===
Weilshäuser was born in Oppeln, Province of Silesia, Kingdom of Prussia, on 31 July 1827, the sixth child of a printer named Weilshäuser and his wife (née Krumbhorn). A contemporary birth notice records his given names as Carl Emil. He was educated at the local gymnasium and learned printing in his father's office. His eldest brother, Gustave, a lifelong vegetarian who died in 1890, influenced his views on diet.

=== Conversion to vegetarianism ===
Weilshäuser became a vegetarian after seeing a butchered calf look at him as it died. In May 1844, his brother lent him Wilhelm Zimmerman's Der Weg zum Paradies ("The Way to Paradise"), which strengthened his commitment to vegetarianism. Although his father opposed his views, Weilshäuser continued to read vegetarian literature, including Gustav Struve's Mandaras' Wanderungen ("The Wanderings of Mandaras") and Jean-Antoine Gleizes's Thalysie. He translated Thalysie into German but was unable to find a publisher.

=== Emigration and career ===
In 1850, Weilshäuser emigrated to Texas with other Silesians, but returned the following year because he found it difficult to maintain his vegetarian diet there. From 1855 to 1862, he ran a printing office in Neustadt, Silesia. After several unsuccessful business ventures, he retired on a modest income.

=== Vegetarian and anti-vivisection organisations ===
Weilshäuser became a member of the British Vegetarian Society in October 1852, with his declaration signed by James Simpson. He was also a foreign corresponding secretary of the society. He was an honorary corresponding member of the Victoria Street and International Anti-Vivisection Society (later the National Anti-Vivisection Society). In 1870, he published a pamphlet translated from English that criticised vivisection.

Weilshäuser later returned to Oppeln. He attended the inaugural meeting of the Vegetarian Society of Germany in May 1869. After the death of Eduard Baltzer, he served as president of the society for three years.

In 1888, Weilshäuser wrote to the British Vegetarian Society to congratulate it on its 41st anniversary. In 1907, he wrote again to mark the society's diamond jubilee.

=== Vegetarian publications ===
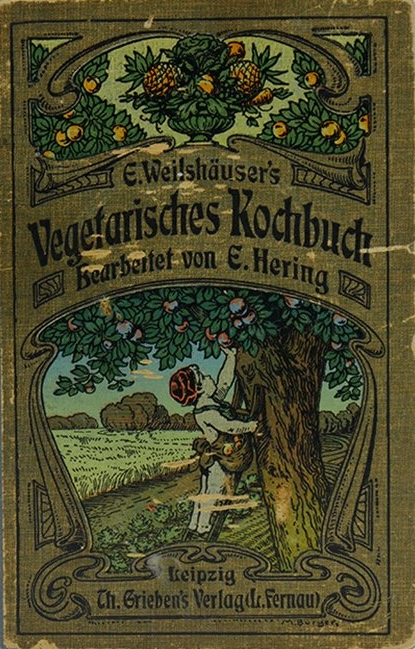
Cover of the 11th edition of Weilshäuser's Illustriertes Vegetarisches Kochbuch (1910)

Weilshäuser published several works connected with the German vegetarian movement between 1855 and 1861. His twelve-volume Familienbibliothek: Gesundheit, Wohlstand, und Gluck ("Family Library: Health, Wealth, and Happiness") contained translations of works on vegetarianism and hygiene by authors including O. S. Fowler, Lydia Fowler, R. G. Gammage, Sylvester Graham, William Horsell, F. R. Lees, T. L. Nichols, A. Nicholson, James Scholefield, John Smith, Laroy Sunderland, and F. Towgood.

The first use of the German word for vegetarianism ("vegetarianismus") in a book has been attributed to an 1855 work published by Weilshäuser, Was ist Vegetarianismus?, a translation of William Horsell's What is Vegetarianism?. An appendix, published in 1856, contained recipes from Vegetable Cookery by the English cookbook writer Martha Brotherton. In 1871, Weilshäuser wrote a vegetarian cookbook. It went through several editions, and later editions included illustrations. In 1886, he wrote Wissenschaftliche Zeugnisse zu Gunsten der vegetarianischen Lebensweise ("Scientific evidence in favour of the vegetarian lifestyle"), which argued for vegetarianism from a scientific perspective.

In 1876, Weilshäuser, Theodor Hahn and others co-published Der Vegetarianer: Zeitschrift für naturgemäße Nähr- und Lebensweise ("The Vegetarians: Newspaper for a Natural Way of Eating and Living"), a German-language periodical on vegetarianism and natural living. It ran from May 1876 to December 1877 and published 12 issues per year. It was published in St. Gallen, Switzerland, and Berlin, Germany.

=== Women in medicine ===
In 1868, Weilshäuser brought English and American debates about allowing women to become doctors to a wider German readership. His paper was titled "Weibliche Ärzte fü Frauen" ("Female Doctors for Women"). In the paper, he quoted the English physician James Edmunds at the opening of the Female Medical Society in London. Edmunds said that, although admitting women to medicine would honour the judgement of "highly civilised nations", opponents could still emerge "from the toad pond of old prejudices".

=== Death ===
Weilshäuser died in Oppeln on 7 December 1917, aged 90.

== Appraisal ==
German historian Wolfgang R. Krabbe described Weilshäuser as the "most important propagandist [of the vegetarian idea] before 1866".

== Selected publications ==
- Was ist Vegetarianismus? Eine Beleuchtung dieses Universal-Princips [What is Vegetarianism? An Examination of This Universal Principle]. 1855.
- Weibliche Aerzte für Frauen, Mädchen und Kinder Ein Wort zur Beherzigung für alle wahren Freunde des socialen Fortschritts [Female Doctors for Women, Girls, and Children: A Word to Heed for All True Friends of Social Progress]. 1868.
- Gesundheit, Wohlstand und Glück [Health, Wealth and Happiness]. 1868.
- Vegetarisches Kochbuch [Vegetarian Cookbook]. 1871.
- Wissenschaftliche Zeugnisse zu Gunsten der Vegetarianischen Lebensweise [Scientific Evidence in Favour of the Vegetarian Lifestyle]. 1886.

== See also ==
- History of vegetarianism
- Vegetarianism in Germany
