= William Hoyle (temperance reformer) =

English temperance and vegetarianism advocate (1831–1886)

William Hoyle FSS
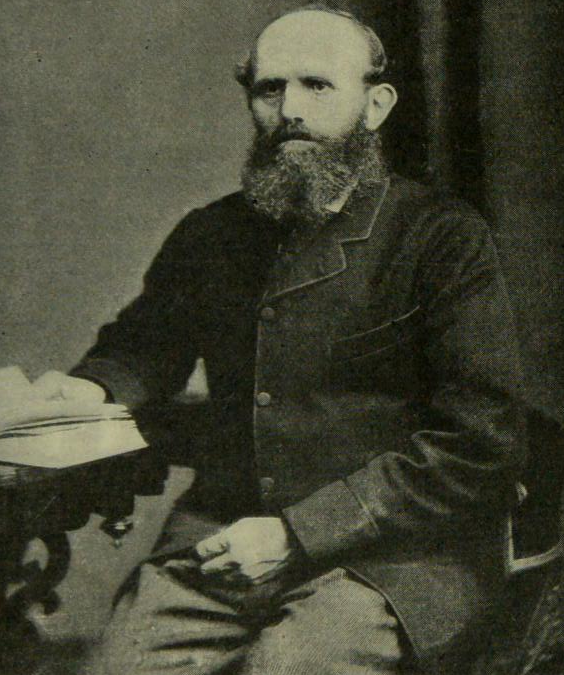
- Hoyle in Fifty Years of Food Reform (1898)
- Born: 5 November 1831; Rossendale Valley, England
- Died: 26 February 1886 (aged 54); Southport, England
- Occupations: Temperance and vegetarianism advocate; writer; manufacturer
- Spouse: Alice Fenton (m. 1859)
- Children: 2

William Hoyle FSS (5 November 1831 – 26 February 1886) was an English temperance and vegetarianism advocate, writer, and cotton manufacturer. He was active in the United Kingdom Alliance, the British Temperance League, and the Vegetarian Society.

== Biography ==
=== Early life and business career ===
Hoyle was born in the Rossendale Valley on 5 November 1831, the fourth child of poor Methodist parents. He began work in a mill at the age of eight and was fully employed as a mill worker by the age of 13. He later became a full operative and supervised several looms.

In 1851, Hoyle was a cotton manufacturer at Brooksbottom with his father. He established his own mill at Tottington in 1859, which employed 500 men by 1877. He married Alice Fenton in 1859; they had a son and a daughter.

=== Temperance work ===
Hoyle became a teetotaller in about 1846. He wrote books and pamphlets on temperance and contributed to its statistical literature. He was elected a Fellow of the Statistical Society, was an executive member and vice-president of the United Kingdom Alliance, and served as treasurer of the British Temperance League.

=== Vegetarianism ===
Hoyle became a vegetarian at the age of 17 for economic and hygienic reasons. In the 1850s, he was secretary of a local vegetarian society at Crawshawbooth. He contributed to The Dietetic Reformer. His pamphlet Food: Its Nature and Adaptability: An Argument for Vegetarian Diet was published in 1864. He was a vice-president of the Vegetarian Society.

=== Death and posthumous publication ===
Hoyle died at Southport on 26 February 1886. He had been in ill health before his death, and had travelled to Southport on medical advice in the hope that rest and a change of air would aid his recovery.

Frederic Richard Lees edited and published Hoyle's final work, Wealth and Social Progress in Relation to Thrift, Temperance and Trade, in 1887. The volume included a biographical essay on Hoyle.

== Selected publications ==
- Food: Its Nature and Adaptability: An Argument for Vegetarian Diet (1864)
- An Inquiry into the Long-Continued Depression in the Cotton Trade (1869)
- Our National Resources and How They Are Wasted (1871)
- On the Waste of Wealth (1873)
- Crime in England and Wales in the Nineteenth Century (1876)
- Wealth and Social Progress in Relation to Thrift, Temperance and Trade (with Frederic Richard Lees, 1887)
