= 1853 Manchester City Council election =

Local election in Manchester

- 1 November 1853

16 of 64 seats to Manchester City Council 33 seats needed for a majority

Elections to Manchester City Council were held on Tuesday, 1 November 1853. One third of the councillors seats were up for election, with each successful candidate to serve a three-year term of office.

== Ward results ==
=== All Saints' ===
All Saints'
Party	Candidate	Votes	%	±%
Conservative	Richard Potter*	142	80.2	N/A
Liberal	Thomas Brittain	35	19.8	N/A
Majority		107	60.4	N/A
Turnout		177		
Conservative hold		Swing		

=== Ardwick ===
Ardwick
Party	Candidate	Votes	%	±%
Liberal	William Vickers*	uncontested		
Liberal hold		Swing		

=== Cheetham ===
Cheetham
Party	Candidate	Votes	%	±%
	George Wadsworth	uncontested		
		Swing		

=== Collegiate Church ===
Collegiate Church
Party	Candidate	Votes	%	±%
Liberal	Miles Craston*	331	83.8	+12.6
Conservative	James Collinge	64	16.2	−12.6
Majority		267	67.6	+25.2
Turnout		395		
Liberal hold		Swing		

=== Exchange ===
Exchange
Party	Candidate	Votes	%	±%
Liberal	Ivie Mackie*	uncontested		
Liberal hold		Swing		

=== Medlock Street ===
Medlock Street
Party	Candidate	Votes	%	±%
Ratepayers	Abraham Dearden*	uncontested		
Ratepayers hold		Swing		

=== New Cross ===
New Cross
Party	Candidate	Votes	%	±%
Conservative	Thomas Lewis Williams*	360	57.1	−2.0
Conservative	John Gibson	318	50.4	−5.3
Liberal	James Scholefield*	301	47.7	−0.7
Liberal	Daniel Stone	282	44.7	−3.7
Majority		17	2.7	−4.6
Turnout		631		
Conservative hold		Swing		
Conservative gain from Liberal		Swing		

=== Oxford ===
Oxford
Party	Candidate	Votes	%	±%
Liberal	James Bake*	274	53.7	N/A
Conservative	Thomas B. Sharp	236	46.3	N/A
Majority		38	7.4	N/A
Turnout		510		
Liberal hold		Swing		

=== St. Ann's ===
St. Ann's
Party	Candidate	Votes	%	±%
Conservative	William Gibb*	uncontested		
Conservative hold		Swing		

=== St. Clement's ===
St. Clement's
Party	Candidate	Votes	%	±%
Conservative	William Gibbon Newton	237	52.9	N/A
Liberal	Robert George Stracey*	211	47.1	N/A
Majority		26	5.8	N/A
Turnout		448		
Conservative gain from Liberal		Swing		

=== St. George's ===
St. George's
Party	Candidate	Votes	%	±%
Conservative	John Haworth*	uncontested		
Conservative hold		Swing		

=== St. James' ===
St. James'
Party	Candidate	Votes	%	±%
Liberal	Thomas Goadsby*	424	65.0	N/A
Conservative	Charles Clarke	228	35.0	N/A
Majority		196	30.0	N/A
Turnout		652		
Liberal hold		Swing		

=== St. John's ===
St. John's
Party	Candidate	Votes	%	±%
Conservative	William Bowker*	uncontested		
Conservative hold		Swing		

=== St. Luke's ===
St. Luke's
Party	Candidate	Votes	%	±%
Liberal	Cornelius Randall*	uncontested		
Conservative	Robert Kay	no votes		
Liberal hold		Swing		

=== St. Michael's ===
St. Michael's
Party	Candidate	Votes	%	±%
Liberal	Hugh Warburton	297	63.5	+10.2
Conservative	Charles Ashmore*	171	36.5	−10.2
Majority		126	27.0	+20.4
Turnout		468		
Liberal gain from Conservative		Swing		
