= Luigi Rubio =

Italian painter

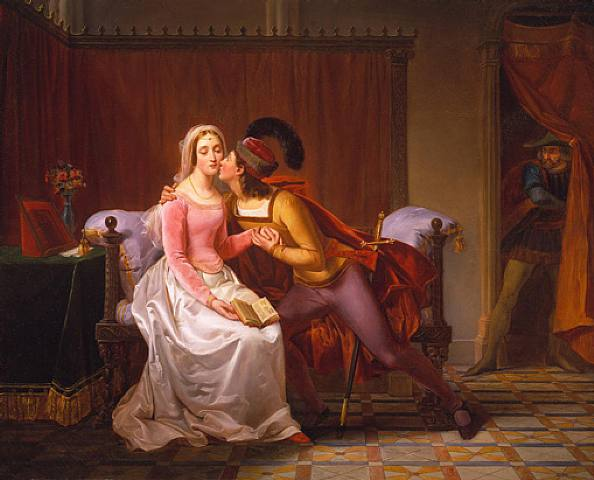
Paolo and Francesca by Louis Rubio - oil on canvas, 1833

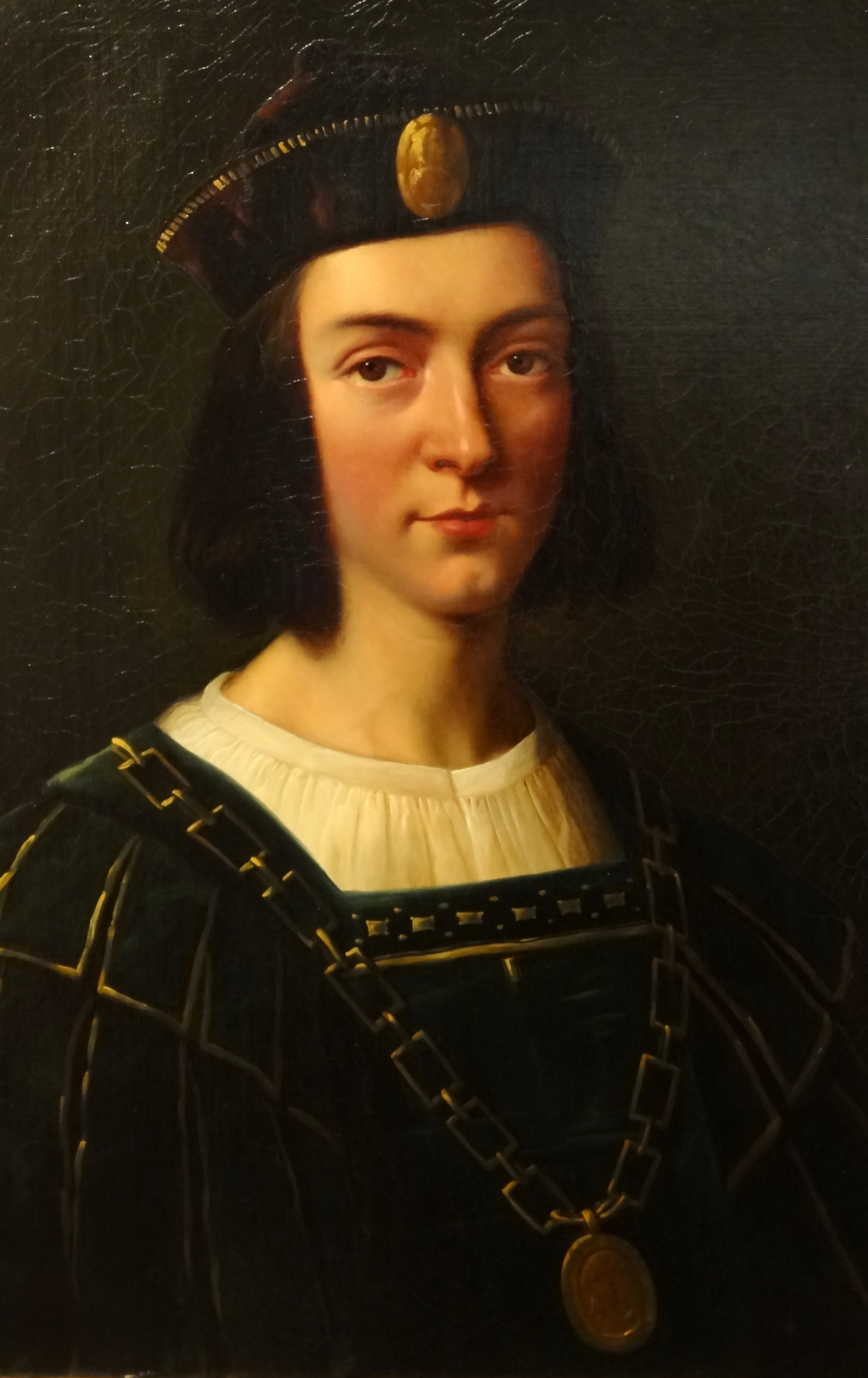
Louis II of Bourbon

Luigi or Louis Rubio (Rome, 6 February 1801 – Florence, 2 August 1882) was an Italian painter, active in both Neoclassicism but later Romantic styles, painting mainly historic-mythologic canvases, as well as some genre subjects, and portraits. His works harked back to the Troubadour style twenty years earlier.

== Biography ==
He was a resident of Rome. He studied as a young man at the Academy of San Luca, and there won the Canova prize. In 1823 he moves to study at the Institute of Fine Arts of Parma: here he won a prize for his Priam at the feet of Achilles. In 1824 at Rome, his canvas of The Samaritan won the Pio Clementine Prize, two gold medals, and granted him a pension of 15 scudi monthly for three years, paid by the papal government under Pope Leo XII. In 1827 he was nominated honorary academic at the Academy in Rome. From 1827-1830, he was commissioned to work for the Count Zamoyski, President of the Senate at Warsaw, Poland.

In 1830-1848, he moved to Paris. His major painting Paolo and Francesca was a highly finished and detailed canvas exhibited at the Paris Salon of 1833, whose colours harked back to those of the turn of the 19th century. Its composition owes much to other depictions of the episode, such as Ingres' many versions, Coupin de la Couperie's painting (1812, purchased by Josephine Bonaparte) and 19th-century engravings. At the 1836 Exposition there, he displayed a canvas depicting Marriage of Salvator Rosa on his Deathbed; and he won a gold medal a number of commissions for the Museum of Versailles, which was being opened by King Louis Philippe I. In 1835 he painted a portrait of Parisian composer Louise Farrenc. At Paris, in addition to portraits, he painted canvases for the Russian Chapel, and a canvas for the church of the contessa Malacoska; another for the Catholic Church of Moscow, a Christ, Saints Peter and Paul. In 1842, he won silver medal at the Exposition at Alençon. In 1843, he won the silver medal at the Exhibition of Boulogne sur-Mer for his portraits.

While in Paris, Rubio met Harriet de Boinville, a well-connected widow who frequently hosted social gatherings for Italian revolutionaries and intellectuals. She attempted, unsuccessfully, to use her social influence to convince the French government to commission a painting by Rubio. A letter written by Claire Clairmont - stepsister to Mary Shelley - unfavorably mentions Rubio:

"Madame de Boinville and Mrs. Turner were very busy in getting deputies to sign a paper to the Chambers to buy a certain pictures of Rubio's. It will most likely not succeed because the French only encourage their own artists of which they have a clamorous multitude. And then Rubio is not such a painter of the first talent, and has no right to expect such a favor."

Harriet de Boinville also introduced Rubio to Vera de Kolgrivoff. The Russian pianist had studied under Frederic Chopin from 1842 to 1846; yet, she struggled to make ends meet and depended on de Boinville's aid. In 1846, Rubio married de Kolgrivoff, with a wedding feast at Madame de Boinville's house.

In 1849, Pope Pius IX raised him to equestrian rank in the order of San Silvestro. In 1862 named knight of the Order of Saints Maurizio and Lazzaro. In 1870 he was nominated professor of the Academy of Fine Arts of Florence and in 1862, his self-portrait was added to the hall of painters at the Uffizi Gallery in Florence.

He was also awarded a prize by Abdülmecid I, for whom Rubio crafted a portrait while in Istanbul. In 1853 he was elected professor at the Academy of Fine Arts of St Petersburg. In 1867 he made painted an icon of San Stanislaus sent to Tsar Alexander II, after decorating the Russian church in Geneva.

Among his later works are: Donna che attinge acqua al fonte (1844); The painter Rubens persuades young Van Dyck to leave the Flemish village of Saventhem, where he had stayed for the love of a young woman (1851); Costumes from the surroundings of Rome(1861); Una filatrice (1861); Shepherds of the Roman Campagna (1861); Contadina che fila (1861); The Charity (1863); Neapolitan Fishermen (1863); Episode from the 1174 Siege of Ancona (1866); and a Portrait of Marcello (1870), the famous classical music composer.
