= 1847 Manchester Borough Council election =

Local election in Manchester

- 1 November 1847

16 of 64 seats to Manchester Borough Council 33 seats needed for a majority

Elections to Manchester Borough Council were held on Monday, 1 November 1847. One third of the councillors seats were up for election, with each successful candidate to serve a three-year term of office.

== Ward results ==
=== All Saints' ===
All Saints'
Party	Candidate	Votes	%	±%
Liberal	Sidney Potter*	uncontested		
Liberal hold		Swing		

=== Ardwick ===
Ardwick
Party	Candidate	Votes	%	±%
	James McConnell	uncontested		
		Swing		

=== Cheetham ===
Cheetham
Party	Candidate	Votes	%	±%
	William Evans*	uncontested		
		Swing		

=== Collegiate Church ===
Collegiate Church
Party	Candidate	Votes	%	±%
Liberal	George Thompson	uncontested		
Liberal hold		Swing		

=== Exchange ===
Exchange
Party	Candidate	Votes	%	±%
Liberal	Ivie Mackie	233	56.1	+3.2
Ratepayers	James Hibbert	182	43.9	−3.2
Majority		51	12.2	+6.4
Turnout		415		
Liberal hold		Swing		

=== Medlock Street ===
Medlock Street
Party	Candidate	Votes	%	±%
Ratepayers	Abraham Dearden	uncontested		
Ratepayers gain from Liberal		Swing		

=== New Cross ===
New Cross
Party	Candidate	Votes	%	±%
Conservative	Thomas Lewis Williams*	266	81.3	N/A
Liberal	James Scholefield	260	79.5	N/A
	William Hamer	65	19.9	N/A
Liberal	John Woolfall	63	19.3	N/A
Majority		195	59.6	N/A
Turnout		327		
Conservative hold		Swing		
Liberal gain from Conservative		Swing		

=== Oxford ===
Oxford
Party	Candidate	Votes	%	±%
Liberal	James Bake	269	61.7	+21.1
Conservative	William Gibb	167	38.3	N/A
Majority		102	23.4	+4.6
Turnout		436		
Liberal hold		Swing		

=== St. Ann's ===
St. Ann's
Party	Candidate	Votes	%	±%
Liberal	John Shawcross*	uncontested		
Liberal hold		Swing		

=== St. Clement's ===
St. Clement's
Party	Candidate	Votes	%	±%
Liberal	Robert George Stracey*	uncontested		
Liberal hold		Swing		

=== St. George's ===
St. George's
Party	Candidate	Votes	%	±%
Conservative	John Haworth	uncontested		
Conservative gain from Liberal		Swing		

=== St. James' ===
St. James'
Party	Candidate	Votes	%	±%
Liberal	David Ainsworth*	uncontested		
Liberal hold		Swing		

=== St. John's ===
St. John's
Party	Candidate	Votes	%	±%
Ratepayers	William Bowker	uncontested		
Ratepayers gain from Conservative		Swing		

=== St. Luke's ===
St. Luke's
Party	Candidate	Votes	%	±%
Liberal	Cornelius Randall*	uncontested		
Liberal hold		Swing		

=== St. Michael's ===
St. Michael's
Party	Candidate	Votes	%	±%
Conservative	Charles Ashmore*	246	68.7	N/A
Liberal	John Kirkham	112	31.3	N/A
Majority		134	37.4	N/A
Turnout		296		
Conservative hold		Swing		
