= C. H. Collyns =

English priest, translator and activist (1820–1885)

The Reverend C. H. Collyns
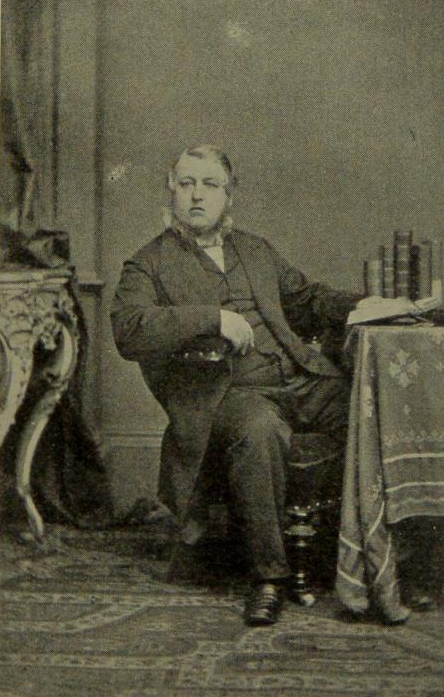
- Born: 1820; Exeter, England
- Died: 8 July 1885 (aged 65); Sheffield, England
- Education: Christ Church, Oxford
- Occupations: Priest, translator, activist

Charles Henry Collyns (1820 – 8 July 1885) was an English priest, translator and activist for temperance and vegetarianism.

== Biography ==
Collyns was born in Exeter in 1820. He was educated at Christ Church, Oxford, and was admitted to orders in 1844. During 1844–1845 he was curate of St Mary Magdalen's Church, Oxford. From 1867 to 1874 he was Headmaster of the Grammar School at Wirksworth, Derbyshire. Collyns was a teetotaller. He was secretary of the British Temperance League which was the oldest national temperance organization in England.

Collyns became a vegetarian in 1872 and joined the Vegetarian Society in September 1873. He later became a vice-president of the society. Collyns was also a member of the Anti-Compulsory Vaccination League, Anti-Narcotic League and the United Kingdom Alliance. He translated the works of Pacian published in the Library of the Fathers in 1844. He also translated Jean-Antoine Gleizes' Thalysie, but it was not published.

Collyns suffered from gout. He died age 65 in Sheffield on 8 July 1885.

== Selected publications ==
- Simplicity of Tastes (Vegetarian Society, 1879)
- The Jubilee of Teetotalism (1882)
