= Fifty Years of Food Reform =

1898 book by Charles W. Forward

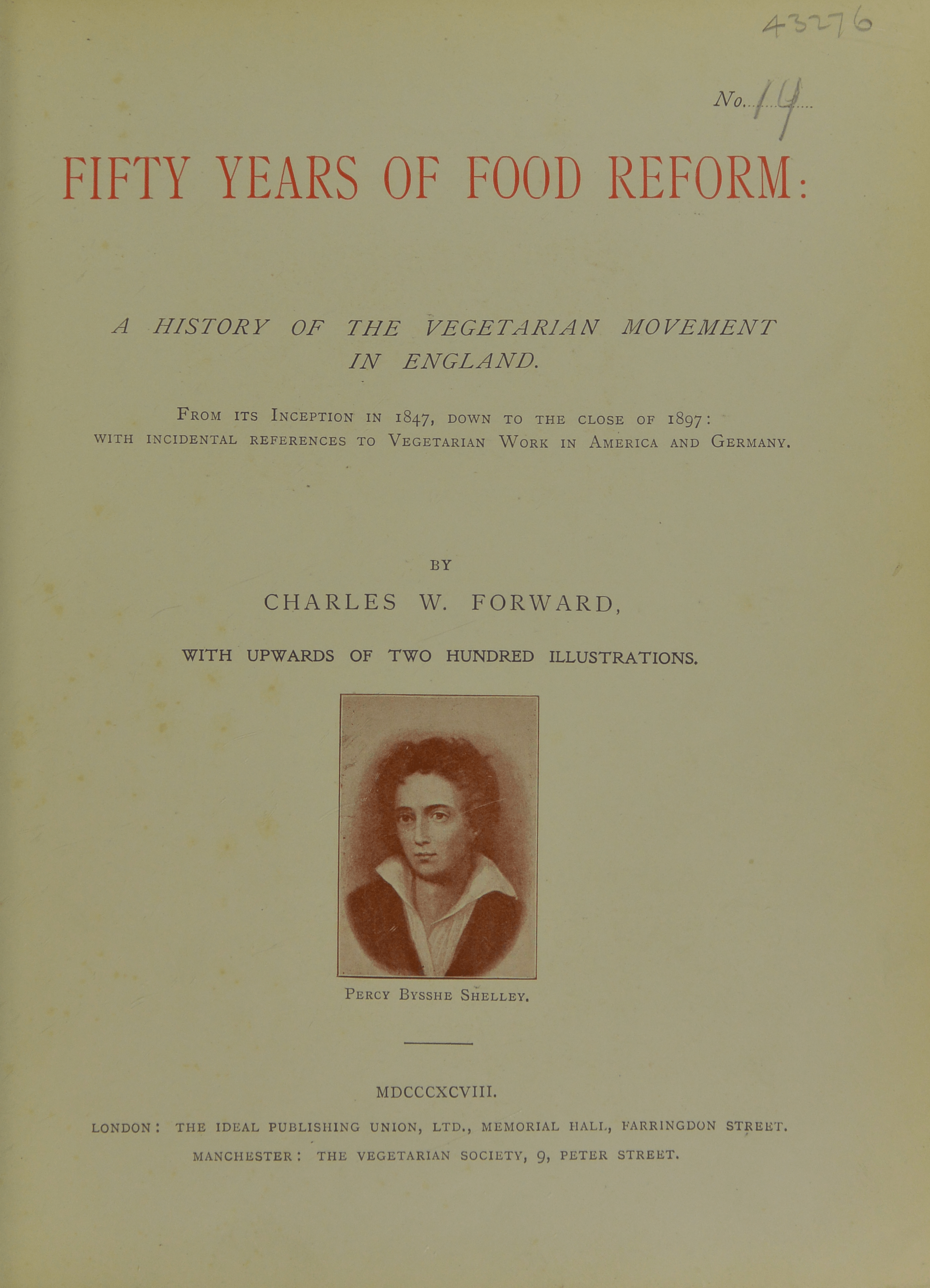
- Title page of the first edition
- Author: Charles W. Forward
- Language: English
- Subjects: Vegetarianism in classical antiquity; Vegetarianism in the Romantic era; Vegetarianism in the Victorian era
- Publisher: The Ideal Publishing Union; Vegetarian Society
- Publication date: 1898
- Publication place: United Kingdom of Great Britain and Ireland
- Media type: Print (hardcover)
- Pages: 192
- OCLC: 62552784
- Text: Fifty Years of Food Reform at the Internet Archive

Fifty Years of Food Reform: A History of the Vegetarian Movement in England (Note: Full title: Fifty Years of Food Reform: A History of the Vegetarian Movement in England: From Its Inception in 1847, Down to the Close of 1897: With Incidental References to Vegetarian Work in America and Germany: With Upwards of Two Hundred Illustrations) is an 1898 book by Charles W. Forward, published by The Ideal Publishing Union and the Vegetarian Society. Based on a series of articles Forward published in The Vegetarian Review in 1897, it surveys vegetarian ideas from classical antiquity through the Romantic and Victorian eras, and traces the British vegetarian movement from the founding of the Vegetarian Society in 1847 to the end of 1897. It also includes brief discussion of related activity in the United States and Germany.

The book contains over 200 illustrations, including portraits and photographs of people, places, and events associated with the movement. Later writers have used it as a source on the British vegetarian movement and its visual record.

== Background ==
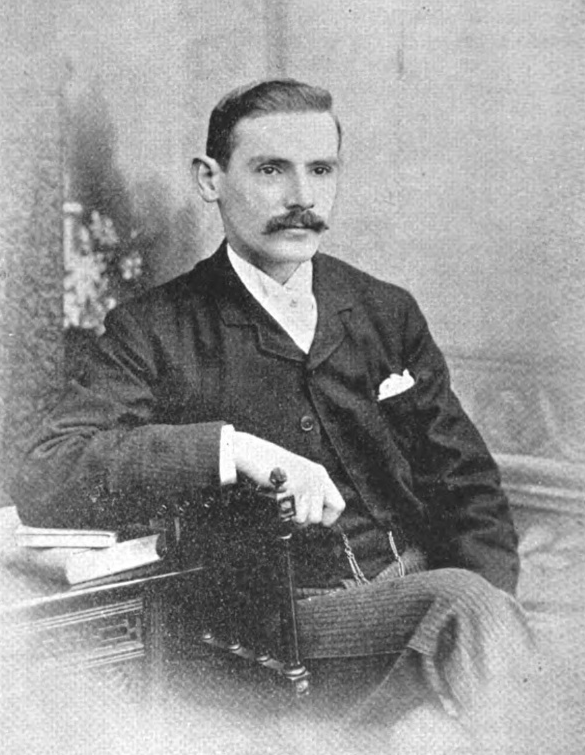
Charles W. Forward (1863–1934)

Charles W. Forward (1863–1934) joined the Vegetarian Society (VS) in 1881 and was active in the vegetarian movement in London. He was a close associate of Arnold Hills, to whom he dedicated the book.

In January 1897, to mark the VS's jubilee, Forward published a series of articles in The Vegetarian Review on the history of the movement. Fifty Years of Food Reform, published the following year, was based on those articles. According to James Gregory, the VS objected to chapter 12 and asked for its name to be removed from the book edition.

Historian Chien-hui Li writes that Howard Williams's The Ethics of Diet (1883), which includes biographical entries on nearly 60 historical figures associated with vegetarian ideas, was a foundation for later histories of the movement, including Forward's.

== Content ==
My endeavour has been to make this volume complete as a history and compendium of information for the student of the movement, rather than to write it with special regard to its literary value.

— Charles W. Forward

Forward begins with an overview of vegetarian ideas from classical antiquity through the Romantic and Victorian eras. He discusses figures including Pythagoras, Ovid, Seneca, and Plutarch, before turning to writers including William Lambe, George Nicholson, John Frank Newton, John Oswald, Richard Phillips, Joseph Ritson, William Cowherd, and Percy Bysshe Shelley.

The book then traces the British vegetarian movement from the founding meeting at Northwood Villa, Ramsgate, on 30 September 1847 to the end of 1897. Forward covers the Vegetarian Society's early organisation and leading figures, its annual meetings, membership and finances, and disputes over whether the movement should promote dietary abstinence alone or a wider reform programme. He also discusses vegetarian literature and restaurants, the revival of organised vegetarianism in London, the National Food Reform Society, the London Vegetarian Society, the Vegetarian Cycling and Rambling Club, the Vegetarian Federal Union, and local societies. An appendix discusses the Battle Creek Sanitarium and John Harvey Kellogg. Parallel movements in the United States and Germany are treated briefly, including the 1893 Vegetarian Congress in Chicago.

The book contains over 200 illustrations, mostly portraits of figures associated with vegetarianism, together with group photographs and views of places and events. The index lists images of delegates at the Vegetarian Congress at Brighton in 1894 and at the World's Fair in Chicago in 1893, views of Northwood Villa at Ramsgate, a map and views of vegetarian restaurants in London, and a photograph of a vegetarian dinner at the Holborn Restaurant in 1897. It also lists illustrations relating to vegetarian and health reform outside Britain, including the Vegetarian Federal Union stall at the World's Fair, Kellogg's sanitarium in Michigan, Russell Thacher Trall's water-cure establishment in the United States, and Shaker communities in the United States.

== Reception ==
A review in The Animals' Friend described Fifty Years of Food Reform as a "handsomely bound historical survey" and praised the amount of research and detail in the work, which it said showed the author's "zeal and devotion". The review also noted the book's "upwards of 200 illustrations", particularly its many portraits of figures associated with the movement, and recommended the volume to readers sympathetic to vegetarianism and humanitarian reform.

== Later assessment ==
Charles Magel included Fifty Years of Food Reform in his 1989 bibliography of animal rights, Keyguide to Information Sources in Animal Rights.

In History of Vegetarianism and Veganism Worldwide (1430 BCE to 1969), Akiko Aoyagi and William Shurtleff describe it as the "best, most comprehensive general history of vegetarianism up to this time" and one of the best sources of historical photographs of the movement.

James Gregory calls Fifty Years of Food Reform "a key source and framework for subsequent treatment of the movement", and considers it a largely accurate history, with some minor problems arising from its origins as a series of short articles. He characterises Forward's account of tensions between the Manchester Vegetarian Society and the London Vegetarian Society as forthright.

== Publication history ==
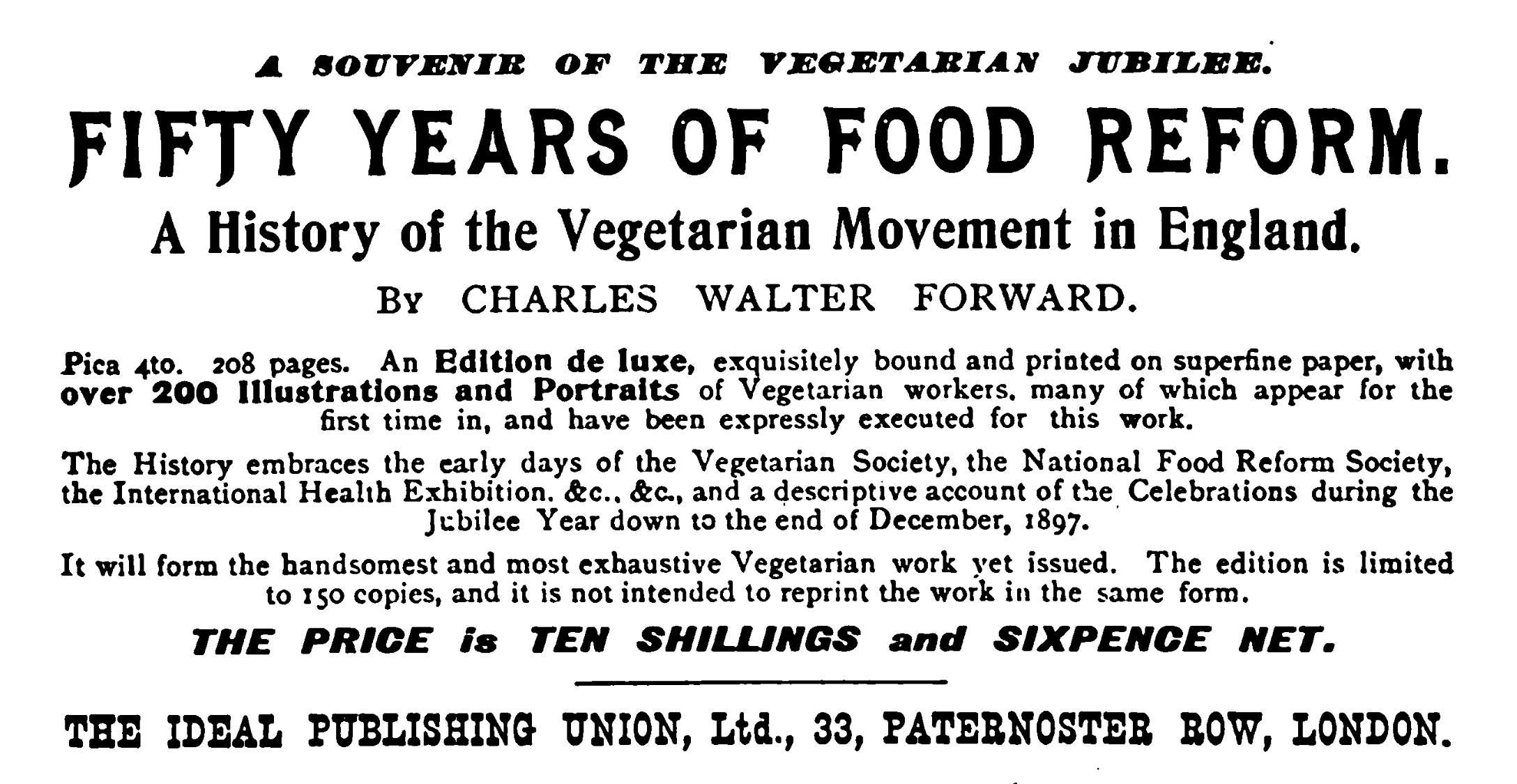
Advertisement for an "edition de luxe" in The Vegetarian Messenger and Review

Fifty Years of Food Reform was published in 1898 by The Ideal Publishing Union in London and by the Vegetarian Society in Manchester. A contemporary advertisement in The Vegetarian Messenger and Review promoted an "edition de luxe" of the book, described as a limited edition of 150 copies, "exquisitely bound" and printed on superfine paper, and priced at £0.53 (equivalent to £59.56 in 2025).

Reprint editions were published by Legare Street Press in 2021 and 2023.

== Selected illustrations ==
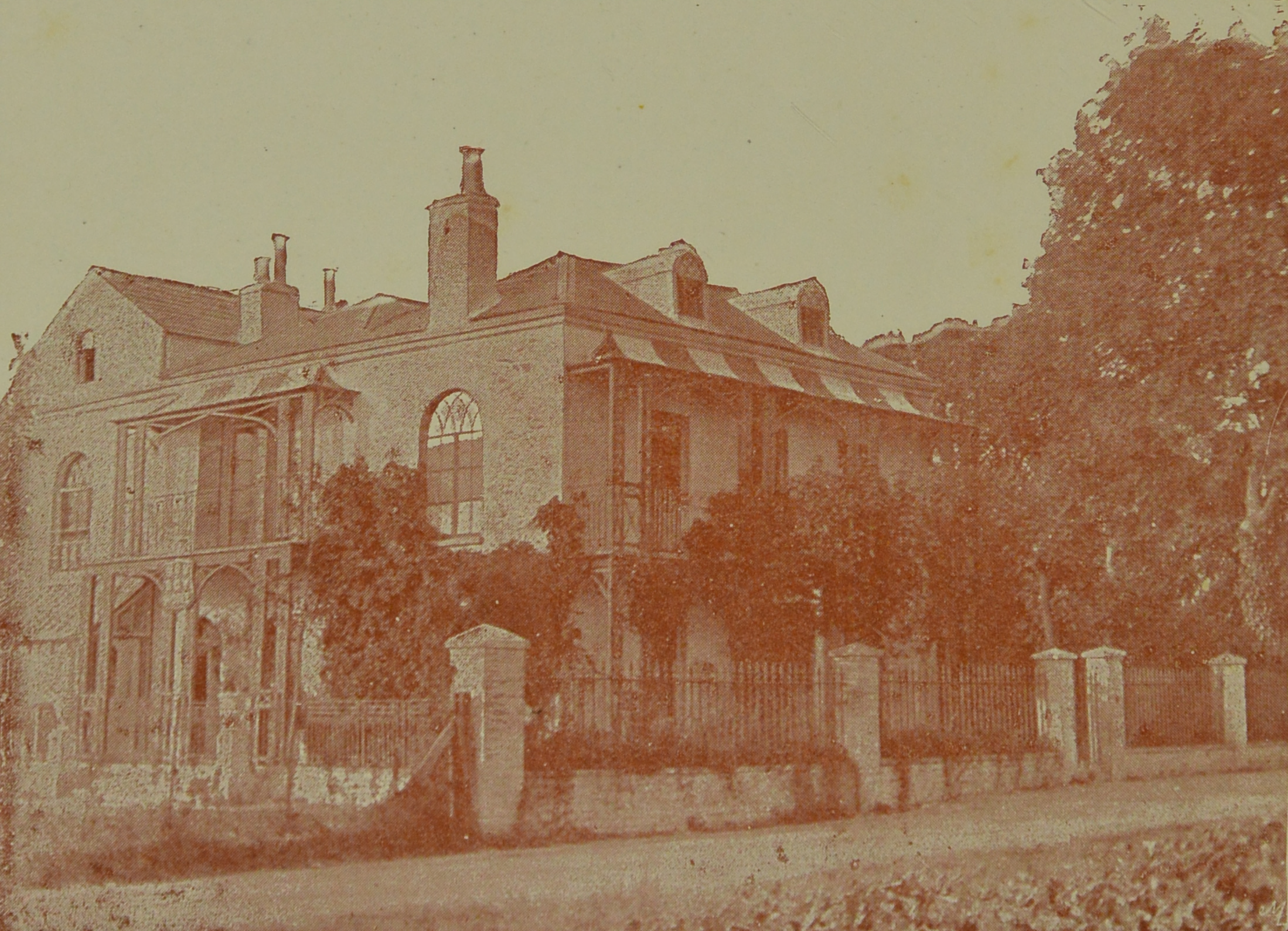
Northwood Villa, Ramsgate, where the Vegetarian Society was founded in 1847

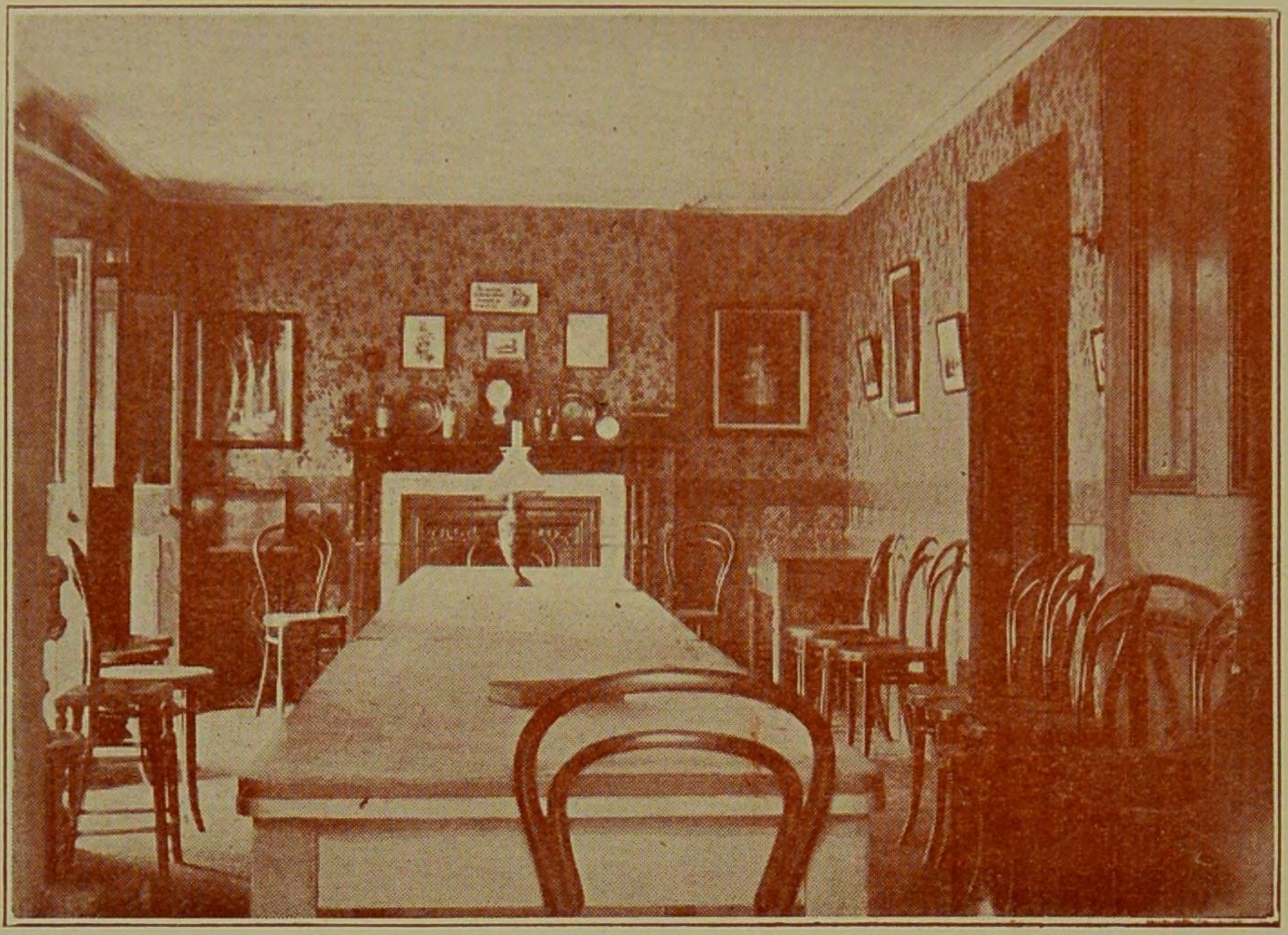
Interior of Northwood Villa

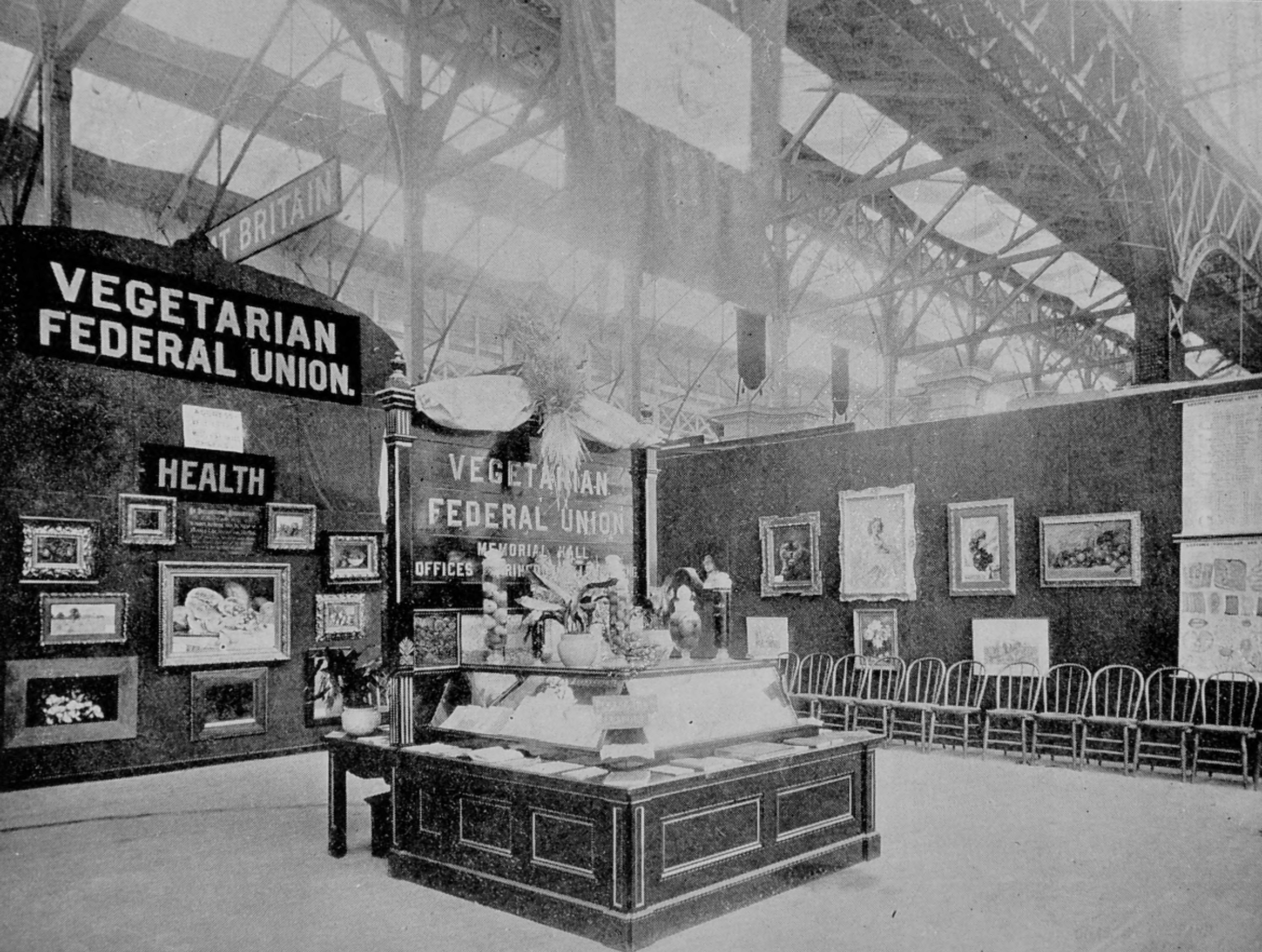
Vegetarian Federal Union stall at the World's Fair in Chicago (1893)

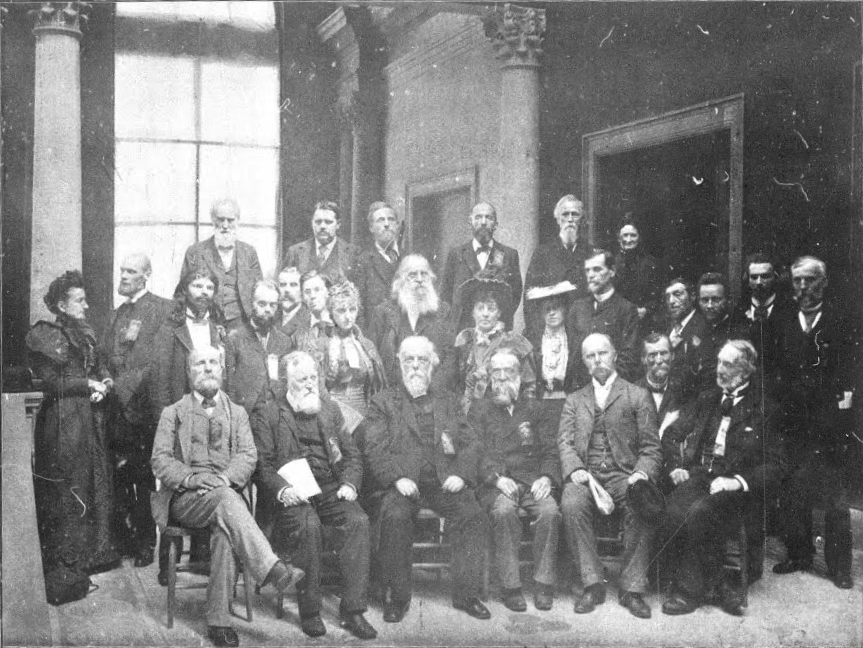
Vegetarian delegates to the World's Fair in Chicago (1893)

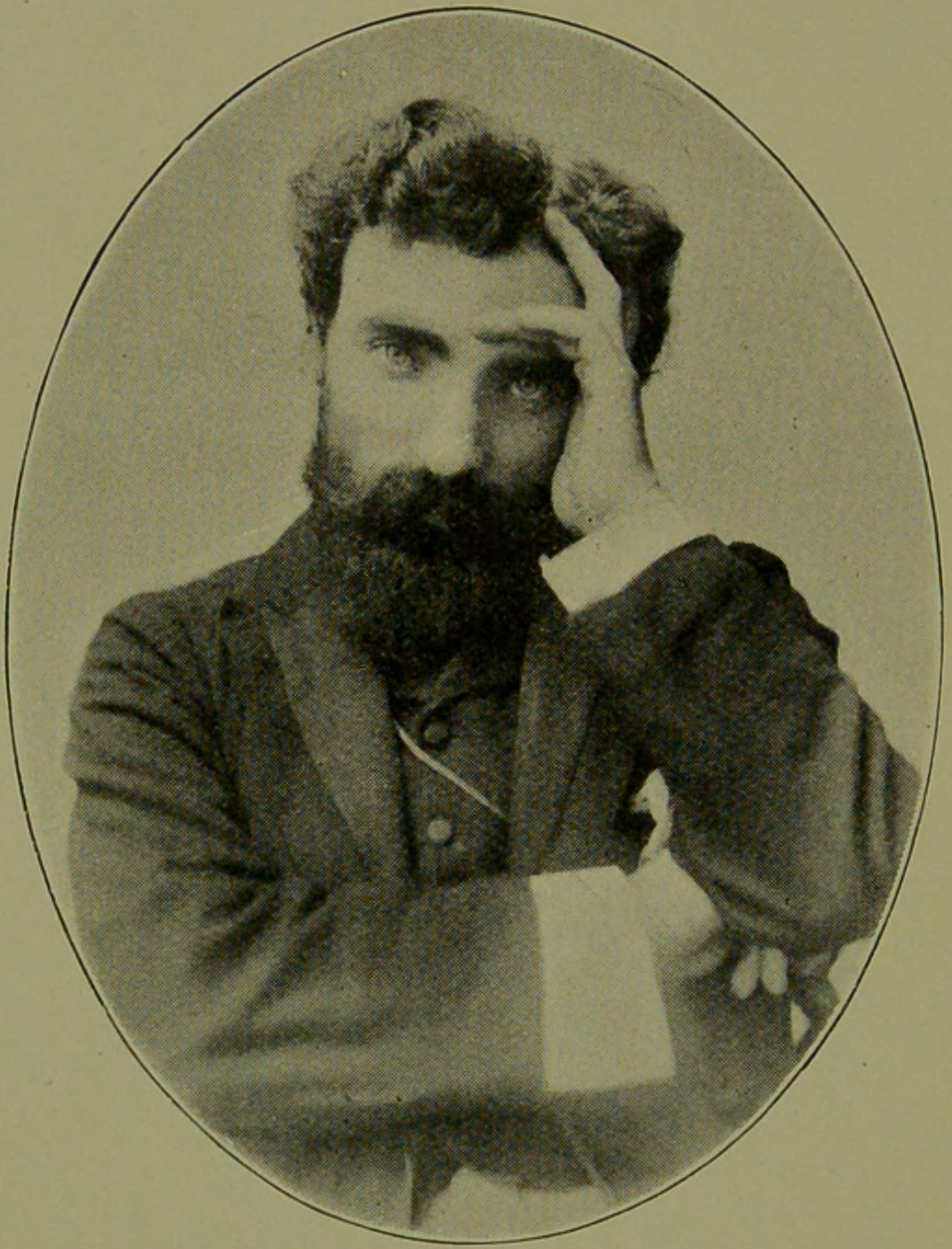
Portrait of Josiah Oldfield

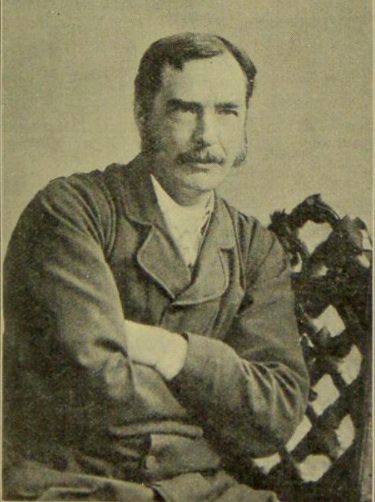
Portrait of Howard Williams

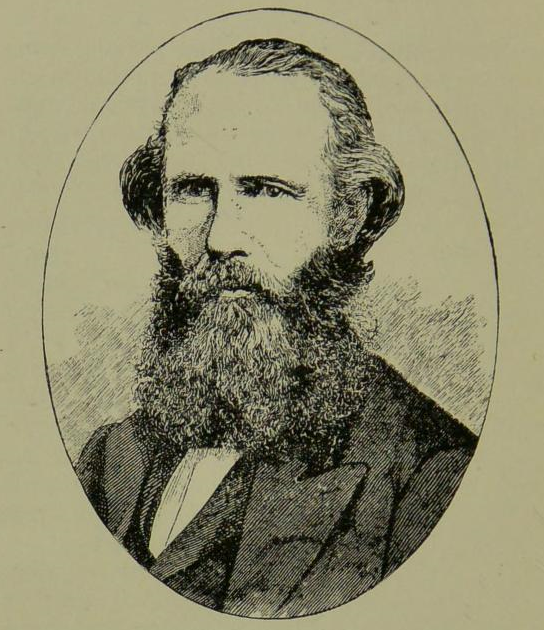
Portrait of Russell Thacher Trall

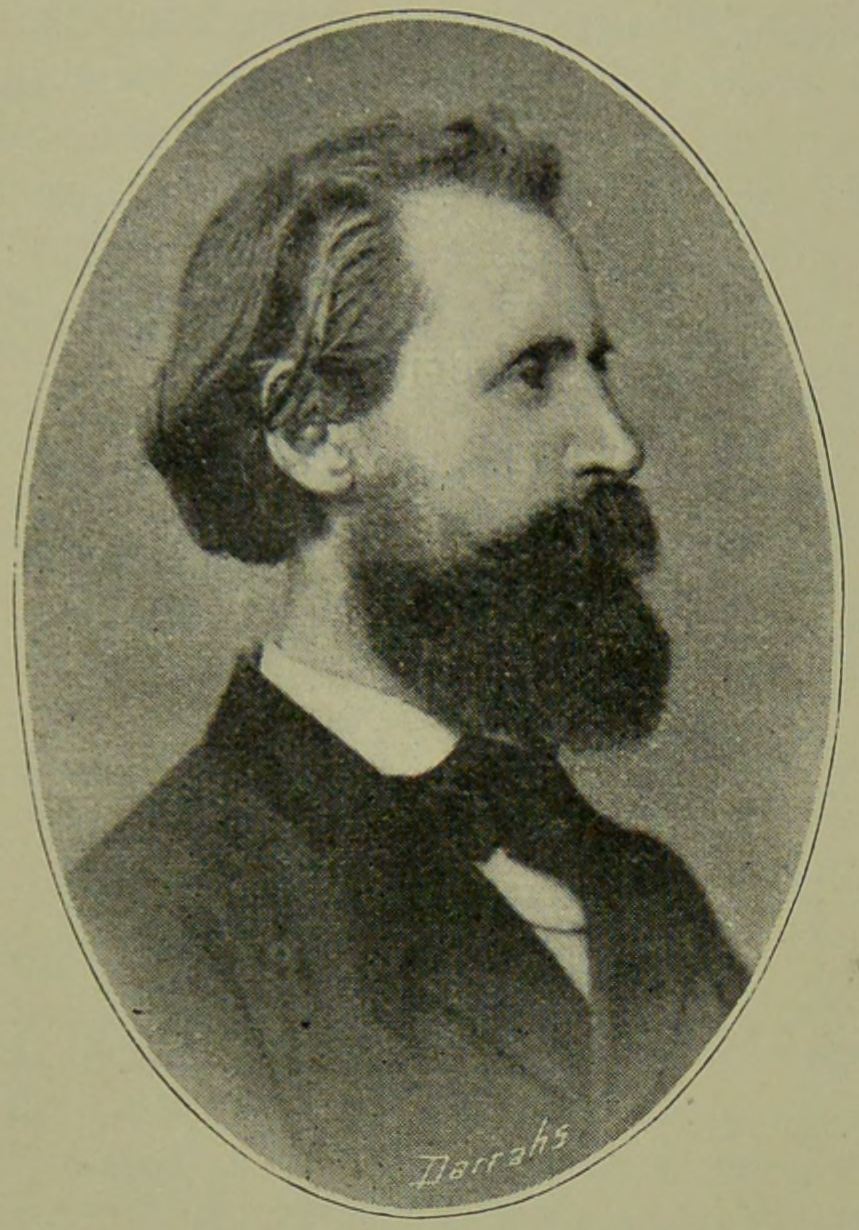
Portrait of Emil Weilshauser

== See also ==
- Bibliography of veganism and vegetarianism
- History of animal rights
- History of vegetarianism
- Vegetarianism in the United Kingdom
- Vegetarianism in the Victorian era
- The Ethics of Diet – 1883 book by Howard Williams
- A Plea for Vegetarianism and Other Essays – 1886 book by Henry S. Salt
- The Logic of Vegetarianism – 1899 book by Henry S. Salt
- Of Victorians and Vegetarians – 2007 book by James Gregory
