= Peter Turner Winskill =

English temperance reformer and historian

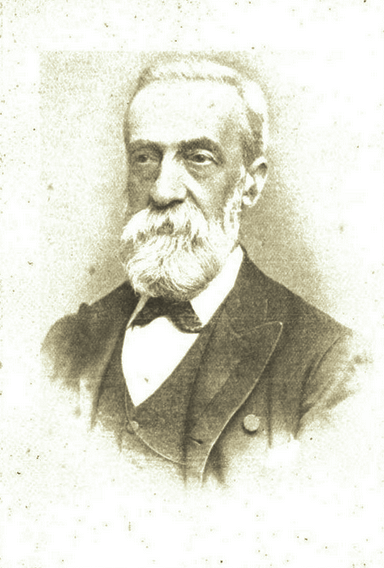
- Born: April 27, 1834; Newcastle upon Tyne
- Died: May 10, 1912 (aged 78); Liverpool
- Occupation: Historian
- Spouse: Elizabeth (m. 1837)

Peter Turner Winskill (April 27, 1834 – May 10, 1912) was an English temperance reformer and historian.

== Biography ==
Winskill was born at Newcastle upon Tyne, Northumberland, April 27, 1834, with a disease considered hopeless by the physicians of his native town. His father, Thomas Winskill, had been a lay preacher and temperance advocate before becoming an alcoholic. Peter had at least one sibling, a brother, James Lockley Winskill (died 1879), who became an officer on board one of the Tyne steamers.

At the age of six, he removed with the family to Houghton-le-Spring, County Durham, England. He was cured of his infirmity by a local pharmacist, and received a brief elementary education at the town's National and Barrington School. He and the family suffered because of the father's alcoholism, and few who knew him in his boyhood ever imagined he would have been able to render such service to the temperance cause as to become an acknowledged historian of the movement. Encouraged to the cause by his mother, he became an active worker from the age of seven, securing many signatures to the abstinence pledge. He was a juvenile Independent Order of Rechabites in the early 1840s.

After working briefly as a pupil teacher, he was employed for three years in the building trade, before removing to Middlesbrough where he became an iron moulder in 1851.

He was one of the original members of the Young Men's Temperance Association, beginning his public career as a reciter, singer and essayist.

After his marriage, he spent some years in Derbyshire as a book and insurance agent and temperance advocate, walking many miles to and from his meetings. From 1863 to 1867, he was again in Middlesbrough as an auctioneer, then to Sunderland, and back to Derbyshire for a short time. In 1871, he became an agent for the Warrington Total Abstinence Society, serving with success for over two years, introducing the International Organisation of Good Templars (I.O.G.T.), the Sons of Temperance, and other organizations, and commencing his career as a temperance historian.

In 1882, the family removed to Liverpool, where they were well known. Winskill died in Liverpool, May 10, 1912.

== Family ==
On February 14, 1857, Winskill married Elizabeth (born 1837). She was a teetotaler and the mother of his fourteen children, which included:

- Peter Turner Winskill, Jr. (born 1861), their oldest surviving son
- Jas. Lockley Winskill (born 1863), second surviving son
- Charles Henry (died 1880)
- John Joseph (died 1891)
- four younger brothers were all life abstainers
- Elizabeth O.
- Margaret Jane
- Rachel Isabella
- Edith Lilian
- Caroline Maria (died 1891)
- Florence Maud (died 1893)

== Selected works ==
- The sons of temperance and teetotal lifeboat crew melodist : comprising 61 original melodies (1868)
- Winskill's Band of Hope melodist : comprising new and original melodies, written expressly for Bands of Hope, etc., and adapted to the most popular airs (1870)
- The comprehensive history of the rise and progress of the temperance reformation from the earliest period to September 1881 : with authenticated particulars of the various offshoots, aids, and auxiliaries to the movement, interwoven with biographical sketches of the pioneers of temperence (1881)
- History of the temperance movement in Liverpool and district, from its introduction in 1829 down to the year 1887 (1887)
- The Temperance Movement and its Workers: A Record of Social, Moral, Religious, and Political Progress (with Frederic Richard Lees, 1891)
- Temperance standard bearers of the nineteenth century : a biographical and statistical temperance dictionary (1897)
