= Harriet de Boinville =

Salon host during 1813–1847 in London and Paris

Harriet de Boinville (1773–1847) was a British woman who entertained widely in London and Paris. She influenced important writers of her day, including Frances Burney, William Godwin, Percy Bysshe Shelley, Mary Shelley, and Giovanni Ruffini. She welcomed guests of all social classes at her popular salons and befriended destitute refugees. She held progressive views and believed in the benefits of a vegetarian diet.

== Early life ==
=== Childhood ===
Henriette Collins was the oldest child of John Collins and his wife (name unknown). She was born in 1773 in the British colony of St. Christopher, now St. Kitts and Nevis. Her mother, possibly biracial, is not mentioned in the family memoir. She had two siblings, Cornelia Collins and Alfred Collins. As a child, she became known as Harriet.

In 1785 Harriet’s father bought a half-share for a sugar estate in St. Vincent. Enslaved Africans toiled on his plantation. A medical doctor, Collins wrote a book of recommended treatments for the slaves of his peers: Practical Rules for the Management and Medical Treatment of Negro Slaves in the Sugar Colonies by a Professional Planter (published anonymously in 1803 and now digitized). William Wilberforce recommended this book to other abolitionists.

Harriet lived in St. Vincent and in England as a child. Her exposure to Europeans’ mistreatment of Africans and indigenous Caribs influenced the egalitarian views she adopted as an adult.

=== Marriage ===
In the early 1790s in London, Harriet fell in love with Jean Baptiste de Boinville. Jean Baptiste was once a wealthy nobleman, with land and property in the south of France, but he had lost everything during the French Revolution. When Harriet's father realized her romantic interest in the penniless French exile, he forbade her from seeing him again.

Harriet and Jean Baptiste eloped to Scotland and were married in 1793 in Gretna Green. When John Collins discovered his daughter had fled, he followed after her and they reconciled. Collins persuaded the couple to marry in England to ensure the legality of any heirs.

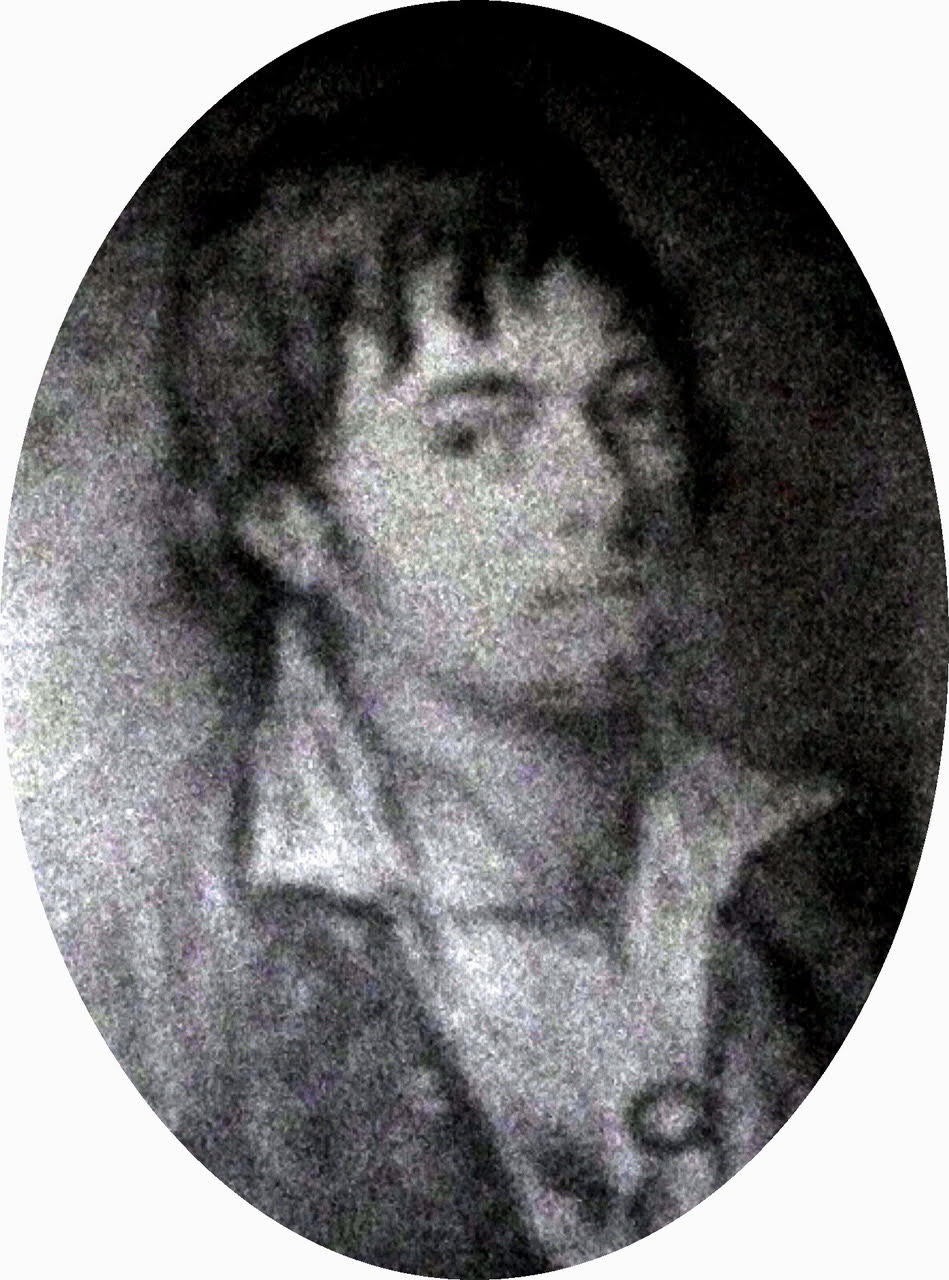
Jean Baptiste, Harriet de Boinville’s husband, in his youth. Source: Barbara de Boinville, author of At the Center of the Circle: Harriet de Boinville (1773-1847) and the Writers She Influenced During Europe’s Revolutionary Era (New Academia Publishing, 2023), p. 12.

=== A year in St. Vincent, 1796-1797 ===
Harriet de Boinville’s first child was born in 1795 in Willesden, England, in her father’s home. In 1796, she returned to St. Vincent with her husband and their baby daughter Cornelia, a six-week journey and some 5,000 miles. The Second Carib War had just concluded on the island, and tensions remained high between the British colonists, French settlers, enslaved Africans, and the native Caribbeans who inhabited it. Harriet’s son, named John Alfred after her father and brother, was born on the island in 1797.

In the same year, Harriet made the difficult journey back to England with her two small children, husband, and father.

=== Wartime travels to France ===
Jean Baptiste de Boinville determined, "despite the entreaties of his wife, to seek some means of gaining his own bread and of living independently. . . . M. de Boinville returned to France to get his name struck off the Emigrant list, and found his way thither through Germany." After many months of separation, Harriet decided to join him in France. She left the English coast at Dover, and took their children, Cornelia and John Alfred, with her. Despite her father’s objections and the illegality of travel between England and France, she crossed the Channel. At Dunkirk the local constabulary detained her under suspicion of being a British spy. To win her release, Jean Baptiste took a coach from Dunkirk to Paris, where he obtained official papers stating that she had permission to enter France.

In Paris Harriet de Boinville celebrated the release of General Lafayette from an Austrian prison by Napoleon’s forces. During Lafayette's imprisonment from 1792 to 1797, she had written letters to try and secure his freedom. Her husband’s former commanding officer “ever afterwards entertained toward her feelings of the highest and most friendly respect.” Kenneth Neill Cameron states that she and Jean Baptiste were formally presented "to the now-aging veteran of two revolutions.”

During the French Revolutionary and Napoleonic Wars, Harriet de Boinville repeatedly risked her life to cross the channel. On one occasion she was nearly shipwrecked with her young children; on another she was taken prisoner at the Hague, “but the jailer was so fascinated by her beauty, and moved by her sorrows, that he contrived to allow her to make her escape.” To be with her husband she even sailed to France one time on a vessel commanded by smugglers; “rough weather came on, the vessel was driven ashore, and she had to get upon a sailor’s back to land; just then, a huge wave threw them all down, and she had the sorrow of seeing most of her bank-notes floating upon the foaming sea, without any hope of rescuing them."

=== Widowed ===
In September 1814, Harriet received word in London of her husband’s death in what is now Vilnius, Poland. He had perished long before on 13 February, 1813. An officer in Napoleon’s Grand Army, Jean Baptiste had participated in the French invasion of Russia and died during the French retreat at the age of fifty-six, as a prisoner of war.

Widowed at the age of forty, Harriet never remarried. Her grandson in his memoir discussed the “marital vicissitudes" of her nineteen-year wartime marriage characterized by danger and unwanted separations since she was British and her husband was from France, Britain’s enemy.

Harriet de Boinville and Percy Bysshe Shelley became friends in the spring of 1813; she was then a widow but had not heard the news. Shelley wrote to his then wife (Harriet Shelley) on 16 September 1814, "Mrs. Boinville has just received intelligence of her husband’s death. She is considerably affected by this circumstance, so that probably some time will elapse before I see her." In 1829, seven years after Shelley’s death, Harriet de Boinville reconnected with his second wife, Mary Shelley.

== Salons at Bracknell ==
Posthumous biographies of Percy Bysshe Shelley describe Harriet de Boinville, the popular host of a salon at Bracknell. Written by Thomas Jefferson Hogg and Thomas Love Peacock, the biographies discuss her informal style of entertaining at her country home outside of London, her vegetable diet, and her guests with whom she debated the merits of William Godwin’s An Enquiry Concerning Political Justice and Its Influence on General Virtue and Happiness (1793). Hogg mocked Harriet’s hospitality because she welcomed people who worked for a living:

The greater part of her associates were odious. I generally found there two or three sentimental young butchers, an eminently philosophical tinker, and several very unsophisticated medical practitioners, or medical students, all of low origin and vulgar and offensive manners. They sighed, turned up their eyes, retailed philosophy, such as it was, and swore by William Godwin and Political Justice.

Hogg also made fun of the meatless meals served at Bracknell. “Flesh, fowl, fish, game, never appeared,” he lamented. “The simple fare of the poorest old woman, or the starved labourer, and his children, through a stern iron necessity, was the diet, through free will and deliberate choice of the most refined, elegant, accomplished, intellectual specimens of humanity.”

Harriet de Boinville was a vegetarian as was her brother-in-law, John Frank Newton, who also frequented the salons at Bracknell. Shelley adopted a diet of fruits and vegetables and mentioned the Newtons' vegetable-fed children in Queen Mab, A Philosophical Poem: With Notes, published in the spring of 1813.

=== Percy Bysshe Shelley at Bracknell ===
Twenty-year-old Percy Bysshe Shelley met the woman he called Mrs. Boinville in the spring of 1813, the same year that he completed his first major work, Queen Mab.

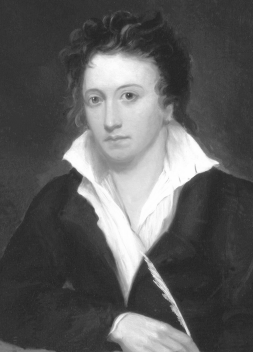
Percy Shelley, painting by Alfred Clint, 1819 (public domain)

After a laudanum overdose and a breakdown, precipitated by marital problems, Shelley sought refuge at Bracknell, where he lived in February and March 1814. On 16 March 1814, he wrote Thomas Jefferson Hogg, "I have been staying with Mrs. B for the last month; I have escaped, in the society of all that philosophy and friendship combine, from the dismaying solitude of myself. They have revived in my heart the expiring flame of life.” In a letter to Hogg on 4 October 1814, Shelley called his two months living at Bracknell "probably the happiest of my life: the calmest, the serenest, the most free from care....the presence of Mrs. Boinville and her daughter afforded a strange contrast to my former friendless and deplorable condition."

Shelley became infatuated with Harriet de Boinville’s daughter Cornelia Turner, referred to in this fragment of poetry written at Bracknell:

Thy dewy looks sink in my breast;

Thy gentle words stir poison there;

Thou has disturbed the only rest

That was the portion of despair!

Subdued to duty’s hard control,

I could have borne my wayward lot:

The chains that bind this ruined soul

Had cankered then—but crushed it not.

Harriet de Boinville discovered Shelley’s interest in Cornelia and told him to leave.

=== Harriet Shelley at Bracknell ===
In 1813 Harriet Shelley had often accompanied her husband to Bracknell, as Peacock's biography of him confirmed. Mrs. Shelley continued to see Harriet de Boinville after her husband ran off to Europe with Mary Godwin and Claire Clairmont.

In her husband’s absence, Harriet Shelley “depended a great deal on Mrs. Boinville’s understanding and on going for long walks with her." A distraught and pregnant Harriet Shelley committed suicide in December 1816. She put rocks in her pockets, walked into the Serpentine River and drowned herself.

Only a few weeks before her death, Blunden states that Mrs. Shelley wrote Harriet, "asking for one more walk of the sort and hinting that without it, she would give up. But the country postman failed to deliver the letter punctually. Harriet interpreted Mrs. Boinville's silence with the result that cannot be forgotten.”

=== Mark Twain on Bracknell ===
A popular posthumous biography of Percy Shelley by Edward Dowden infuriated Mark Twain. The book described Shelley at Bracknell. Twain considered Dowden’s portrayal of the dead poet too forgiving and so he wrote an article entitled “In Defense of Harriet Shelley." His method was to use comments made by Dowden and Hogg in their biographies of Shelley for his satiric attack. For example, Twain twisted their words about Harriet de Boinville, her daughter Cornelia Turner, and her sister Cornelia Newton. He called the women “The Boinville Hysterical Society”, and he referred to Bracknell as “the sty at Bracknell” and “the prairie-dogs’ nest at Bracknell."

== Influence on writers ==
=== Percy Bysshe Shelley ===
Percy Bysshe Shelley idolized Harriet de Boinville in numerous letters. "I could not help considering Mrs. B. when I knew her as the most admirable specimen of human being I had ever seen,” he once wrote. "Nothing earthly ever appeared to be more perfect than her character and manners.” In the spring of 1813 Shelley gave her a present: Queen Mab. “I value highly this copy,” she wrote to his widow in 1839, “a relic of genius, of friendship, of past happy days which it would really grieve me to lose.”

The friendship between the poet and Harriet de Boinville was brief (from the spring of 1813 to the spring of 1814). Shelley’s ardent interest in her daughter and later love affair with Mary Godwin effectively killed their rapport as did the subsequent tragedy, the suicide of Harriet Boinville's friend Harriet Shelley. After Harriet Shelley’s death, she said yes when Shelley asked her to mediate with his dead wife’s family for custody of the children, Ianthe and Charles Shelley. Shelley lost the custody fight.

After he moved to Italy Shelley continued to think about Harriet de Boinville. From Rome he wrote to Thomas Love Peacock on 6 April 1819: "It is improbable that I shall ever meet again this person whom I once so much esteemed, and still admire. I wish however that when you see her you would tell her that I have not forgotten her, or any of the amiable circle once assembled round her.” Three months later he referred to Harriet de Boinville as his “lost friend” in a letter to Thomas Jefferson Hogg and praised her “freedom from certain prejudices” and “the elegance and delicate sensibility of her mind.”

For her part, Harriet de Boinville regretted her behavior toward Shelley. “My intimacy with Shelley ought not to have ended as it did,“ she wrote his widow, Mary Shelley, on 16 October 1829. "I say this with self-reproach and I still feel the sharpened pang which this thought added to all my other feelings on his life.“

In The Young Shelley: Genesis of a Radical, Kenneth Neill Cameron described the impact of “the Boinville circle” on Shelley: “It was his first introduction to a society of intellectual radicalism, a society presided over by a lady of intelligence and charm.”

=== Mary Shelley ===
Harriet de Boinville’s friendship with Mary (the daughter of William Godwin and Mary Wollstonecraft) spanned four decades. It began in London in the early 1800s. Harriet was a frequent guest of Godwin’s in his home on Skinner Street, where he moved after the death of Mary’s mother and his remarriage. Harriet’s daughter Cornelia and Mary Godwin were childhood playmates. Harriet de Boinville invited Mary to Cornelia’s nuptial ball in London in 1812. Two years later Harriet de Boinville’s cordial relationship with Mary ended because of her relationship with Percy Bysshe Shelley.

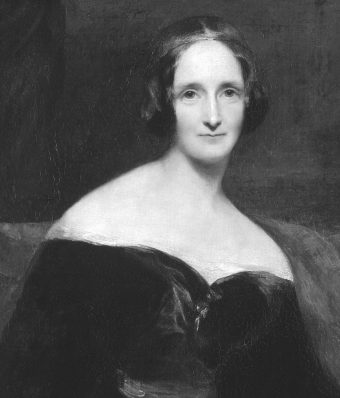
Portrait of Mary Shelley by Richard Rothwell 1840. Source: Public Domain.

In the summer of 1829, Harriet de Boinville received “a friendly letter” from Mary Shelley and the two widows began to correspond and see each other again. Harriet wrote Mary four letters now preserved in the University of Oxford, Bodleian Library, Abinger Collection, published for the first time in At the Center of the Circle: Harriet de Boinville (1773-1847). In these letters (dated 16 October 1829, 11 June 1836, 18 December 1837, and 26 January 1839), Harriet discussed her personal feelings about Shelley and Godwin and suggested ways in which she could help Mary promote their literary legacies. In addition, she encouraged Mary with her own writing. “What is your pen doing just now?” she asked in 1837. By this time Mary had written the Gothic classic Frankenstein (1818); other novels (Valperga, The Last Man, Perkin Warbeck, Lodore, Falkner, and Mathilde), as well as History of a Six Weeks’ Tour. Harriet discussed at length their mutual friend, the social reformer and abolitionist Frances Wright, and "the present affecting state of Italy” in the 1836 letter. Mary often visited Madame de Boinville in Paris. “There is something in her society and conversation that animates and pleases me,” she wrote her sister Claire Clairmont on September 20, 1843. Through Madame de Boinville, Mary met Italian refugees in Paris who had been rebels in the movement for Italian independence and unification. In the early 1840s, Claire moved to Paris where she attended Harriet de Boinville's social gatherings, crowded with republicans and Italian revolutionaries. In one letter to her half sister, Mary, she wrote:

At Madame de Boinville's the people are clever and I go there and I like the conversation, but I am never allowed to speak myself...after fifteen years being silent, I want to talk a good deal...to clear out my mind of all the ideas that have been accumulating and literally rotting there for so many years - but they won't allow me this in Rue Clichy- the instant I speak, the whole coterie fall upon my words and pick them to pieces...seize upon my argument (so dear to me)...they are liberals of such opposite characters.

=== Frances Burney d'Arblay ===
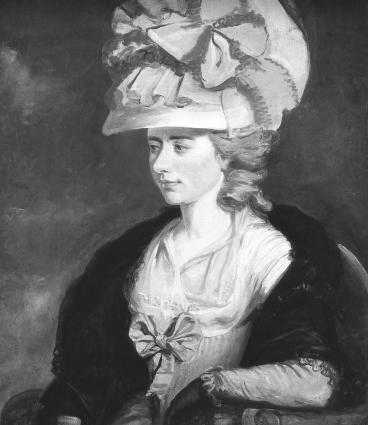
Portrait of Frances Burney by her cousin Edward Francis Burney. Source: Public Domain.

Harriet was a close friend of the most famous female novelist in Britain at the end of the eighteenth century, Frances Burney. In 1793 the two British women disobeyed their fathers to marry French aristocrats who had become virtually penniless exiles in London as a result of the French Revolution. Harriet eloped to Scotland. Miss Burney married in her native country; her disapproving father refused to attend the ceremony. Harriet always respectfully addressed Frances, twenty years older, as Madame d’Arblay. Soon the friends were mothers. Frances had a son in 1794; Harriet had a daughter in 1795 and a son two years later.

At the beginning of the French Revolution, Jean Baptiste de Boinville and Alexandre d’Arblay had served under General Lafayette. Before his marriage, Jean Baptiste wrote in French to Alexandre about Harriet, “someone I adore and who embodies all that is amiable and good.”

Harriet wrote Frances Burney d’Arblay on 19 February 1802, and on 7 March 1814. These letters, preserved in the New York Public Library, Henry W. and Albert A. Berg Collection of English and American Literature, reveal the interconnectedness of the d’Arblay and de Boinville families. The letters attest to the novelist’s importance in her life. Harriet’s purpose in writing in 1802 was to commiserate with her friend’s fears about Alexandre’s safety; he was intending to return to military service for France as the leader of a brigade to Santo Domingo. She begins the letter to Frances Burney d’Arblay, “Not many of those who are happy enough to be personally and intimately acquainted with you Madam, can have taken a deeper interest, or greater share in all the painful feelings that have lately agitated you.”

In the 1814 letter Harriet apologizes for not replying promptly to a “delightful letter.” She thanks Frances Burney d’Arblay for her help: “how soothingly kind you were to me in my Illness in Paris. How condescendingly good to my children in my absence.” The letter refers to both of their families. Harriet discusses problems with the wartime post and writes, “I shall have the greatest pleasure in forwarding any letters for you my dear Madam.”

The Peace of Amiens was short-lived (20 April 1792 to 25 March 1802). With the resumption of war between England and France, Harriet and Frances Burney d’Arblay were torn in one direction by their British fathers and in another by their French husbands.

Frances Burney’s diaries and journals mention Harriet and Jean Baptiste de Boinville. He assisted the famous author in her attempts to return to her native country during the Napoleonic Wars.

=== William Godwin ===
In 1784, William Godwin, an aspiring writer in need of money, hoped John Collins (Harriet's father) could help him. Collins was the wealthy owner of a sugar plantation in St. Vincent. Godwin asked his friend James Marshall, also a young writer, to sail to the West Indies to convince Collins to fund their writing. Marshall did not succeed, but the close connection between Godwin and members of the Collins family continued for fifty years.

Harriet de Boinville, John Collins’s eldest daughter, became one of Godwin’s closest friends in London. They met seventy-two times between 1809 and 1827, when she moved to Paris. She admired his treatise titled An Enquiry Concerning Political Justice and Its Influence on General Virtue and Happiness (1793). At her country home outside London, she debated with her guests the principles Godwin espoused. One guest, Thomas Jefferson Hogg, later wrote that she “swore by Godwin and Political Justice.”

In 1836, Harriet de Boinville called the death of Godwin “the extinction of a mastermind" in a letter to Mary Shelley. "Everything is interesting which relates to such a man, one of the gifted few under whose moral influences society is now vibrating.”

== Death ==
Harriet de Boinville died in Paris on 1 March 1847, at the age of seventy-three or seventy-four (exact day of birth unknown). Writing in French, her friend Giovanni Ruffini informed her grandson Charles: “I am fulfilling a sad duty for your aunt Cornelia, broken by sorrow and fatigue. Alas, my dear Charles, our sweet and well-loved grandmother is no more. This morning at six she took her last breath.” She was buried in Montmartre Cemetery. Her daughter Cornelia Turner, grandsons Oswald and Alfred Turner, and friend Giulio Robecchi were later buried in the same plot.

== Bibliography ==
de Boinville, Barbara. At the Center of the Circle: Harriet de Boinville (1773-1847) and the Writers She Influenced During Europe's Revolutionary Era. (2023). Washington, DC: New Academia Publishing.
