= The Logic of Vegetarianism =

1899 book by Henry S. Salt

- First edition cover
- Author: Henry S. Salt
- Language: English
- Series: Vegetarian Jubilee Library
- Subject: Vegetarianism; animal ethics
- Genre: Essay collection; dialogues
- Publisher: The Ideal Publishing Union
- Publication date: 1899
- Publication place: United Kingdom
- Media type: Print (hardcover)
- Pages: 119
- OCLC: 1040251516
- Text: The Logic of Vegetarianism at Project Gutenberg

The Logic of Vegetarianism: Essays and Dialogues is an 1899 book by the British writer and social reformer Henry S. Salt, published by The Ideal Publishing Union as part of its Vegetarian Jubilee Library series. The book presents arguments for vegetarianism in a series of essays and dialogues. It discusses vegetarianism from ethical, physiological, economic, and aesthetic perspectives, and replies to objections to a vegetarian diet.

The work was first serialised in The Vegetarian Messenger before publication in book form. A review in the same periodical described it as a contribution to vegetarian literature that presented both supportive and opposing views through its format. Later editions were published in 1906 and 1933.

== Background ==
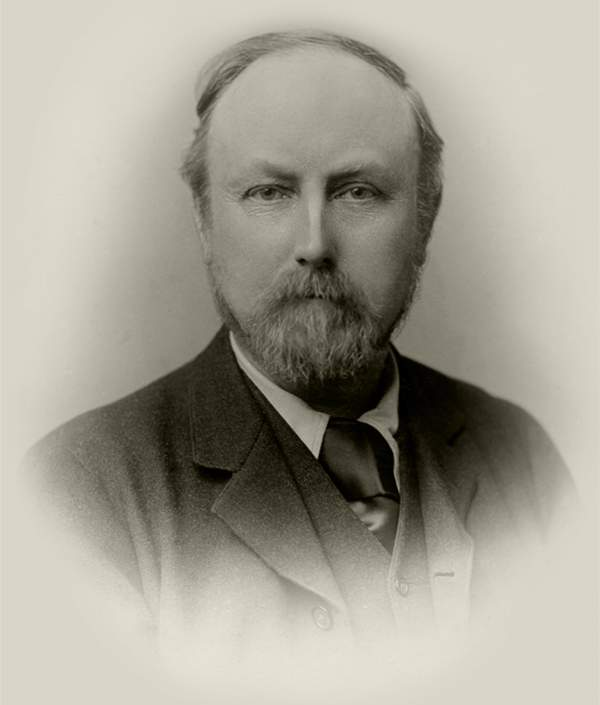
Henry S. Salt

In the late 19th century, vegetarianism in Britain was linked to social reform movements. Henry S. Salt was a writer and activist involved in prison reform, education, economic justice, pacifism, and animal welfare. He founded the Humanitarian League in 1891 and has been described as an early figure in the animal rights movement. Mahatma Gandhi later acknowledged Salt as an influence on his adoption of vegetarianism.

Salt was a socialist and anti-vivisectionist who wrote on ethical and humanitarian subjects. He published more than 40 books, beginning with A Plea for Vegetarianism and Other Essays in 1886, in which he argued that vegetarianism was humane, moral, economical, healthy, and conducive to self-restraint. He followed it with Animals' Rights: Considered in Relation to Social Progress, which argued for animal rights in relation to social reform and opposed common justifications for inflicting unnecessary suffering on sentient beings.

The Logic of Vegetarianism was first serialised in The Vegetarian Messenger. According to the Henry S. Salt Society, the book was written to present a defence of vegetarianism through essays and dialogues addressing common objections.

== Summary ==
The Logic of Vegetarianism presents arguments for vegetarianism through essays and dialogues. Salt replies to common criticisms of vegetarianism, including the claim that vegetarians were "cranks" or ascetics, and argues that opposition to vegetarianism often rests on custom rather than reasoned argument.

Salt discusses vegetarianism from ethical, physiological, economic, aesthetic, and historical perspectives. He argues that the human body is suited to a vegetarian diet, that vegetarianism is consistent with health and hygiene, and that slaughter has moral and physical effects on those involved in it. He also refers to examples from ancient and modern history to connect vegetarianism with traditions of non-violence toward animals.

The dialogue chapters use fictional opponents to set out objections to vegetarianism and Salt's replies to them. In the later chapters, Salt presents vegetarianism as part of wider humanitarian and rationalist reform, and argues that conduct toward animals should be guided by reason and sympathy rather than custom.

== Reception ==
A review in The Vegetarian Messenger described The Logic of Vegetarianism as a contribution to vegetarian literature, noting its use of essays and dialogues to present both supportive and opposing views. The review said that some counterarguments might seem weak, but noted that they had often been raised in public discussion and said that the book could help advocates respond to common criticisms.

A review in The New England Anti-Vivisection Society Monthly said that "we can truthfully say we have never read a book more clearly, succinctly and convincingly written. It is a compendium of the subject, and should be in the possession of every food reformer".

== Publication history ==
The Logic of Vegetarianism was first published in 1899 by The Ideal Publishing Union, as part of its Vegetarian Jubilee Library series. A second edition was published by George Bell & Sons in 1906, followed by a revised and abridged edition issued by the London Vegetarian Society in 1933.

== See also ==
- Books by Henry Stephens Salt
- Bibliography of veganism and vegetarianism
- History of animal rights
- History of vegetarianism
- Vegetarianism in the Victorian era
- The Ethics of Diet – 1883 book by Howard Williams
