= United Kingdom Alliance =

British temperance organisation, 1853–1942

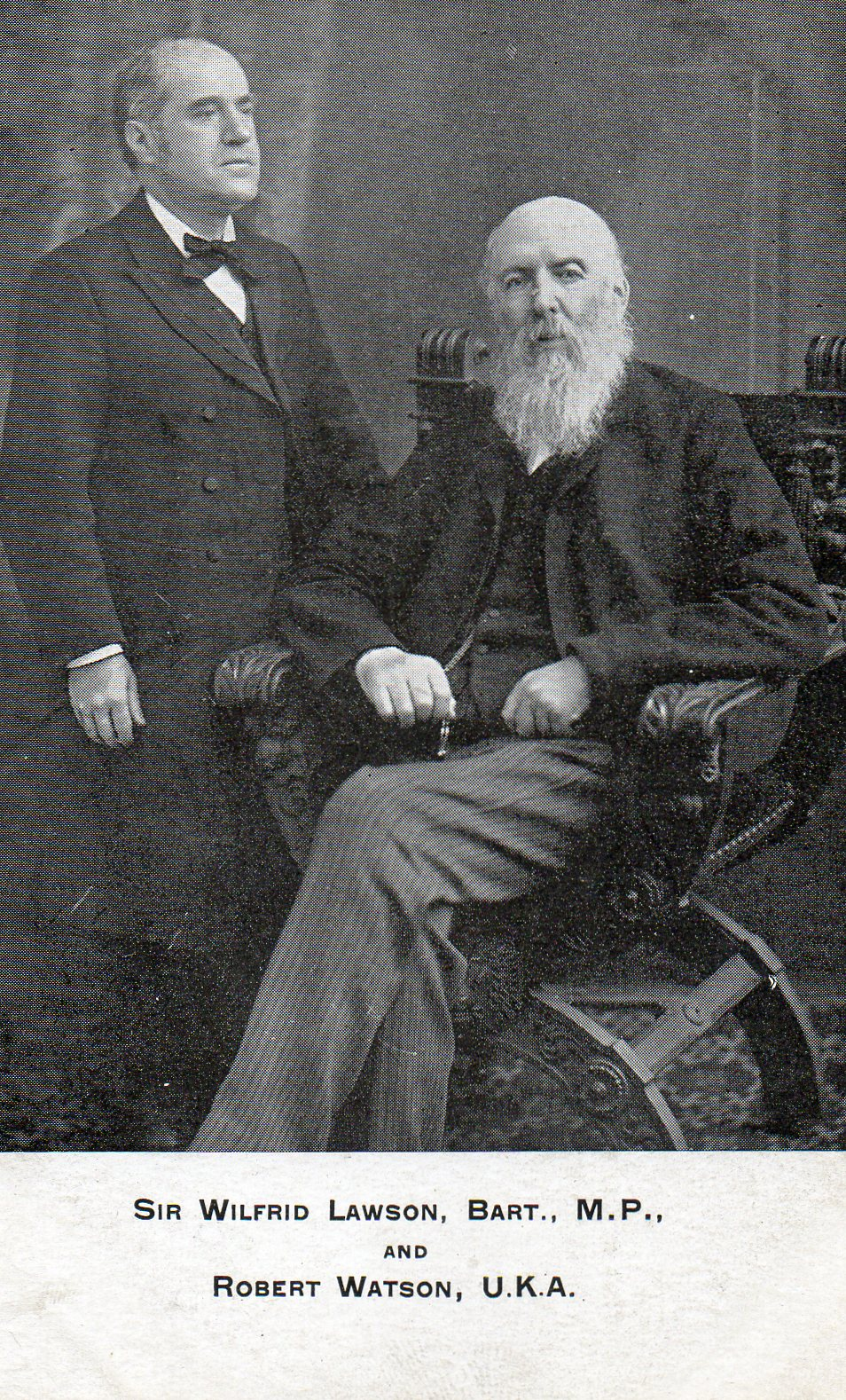
Sir Wilfrid Lawson and Robert Watson, leaders of UKA

The United Kingdom Alliance (UKA) was a British temperance organisation. It was founded in 1853 in Manchester to work for the prohibition of the trade in alcohol in the United Kingdom. This occurred in a context of support for the type of law passed by General Neal Dow in Maine, United States, in 1851, prohibiting the sale of intoxicants.

== Early history ==
The idea was initiated by Nathaniel Card (1805–1856), an Irish cotton manufacturer and member of the Society of Friends. He had earlier been a member of the Manchester and Salford Temperance Society, and had taken his inspiration from the success of what later became known as the Maine Liquor Law. At a private meeting at Card's house on 20 July 1852, the National League for the Total and Legal Suppression of Intemperance was formed. Those present included Joseph Brotherton Member of Parliament for Salford and his cousin Alderman William Hervey, also of Salford. At a subsequent meeting of the League they formed a Provisional Committee based in Manchester. It was not, as some people thought, simply another temperance movement or teetotal organisation; the organisers believed that temperance societies fail until legal temptations for drink and drunkenness was taken away. They aimed for legislative suppression of traffic in intoxicating beverages.

On 14 February 1853, the name of the organisation changed to the United Kingdom Alliance for the Suppression of the Traffic in all Intoxicating Liquors. In June that same year Sir Walter C. Trevelyan became their first president. The General Council held their first meeting in October. Their early devotees were a mixed group of Temperance reformers, and Anti-Corn Law League agitators. The membership included Father Mathew, James Silk Buckingham, the London publisher William Tweedie, Samuel Bowly, Sir Joseph Cowen, Frederic Richard Lees (1815–1897), Joseph Livesey of Preston and Samuel Pope. William Hoyle was vice-president and Thomas Holliday Barker was secretary. In 1874, Sir Wilfrid Lawson commented:

The object of the Alliance shall be to call forth and direct an enlightened public opinion to procure the total and immediate suppression of the traffic in all intoxicating liquors or beverages.

Since they considered themselves a legitimate political party they pledged to badger Parliament to outlaw liquor in the United Kingdom. They were not a total abstinence society, and membership was open to teetotallers and drinkers alike. In 1854 they published a weekly newspaper, The Alliance News, a journal of moral and social reform that sold for one penny.

The first year's income of the Alliance was only £900, which was used to hold public awareness meetings. By 1858 the membership had risen to 4,500, and £3000 was raised by subscription for their work. In 1862, the London Union of Alliance members changed to the London Auxiliary of the Alliance, and appointed their first London agent, Rev. John Hanson.

Their chief public spokesman was Sir Wilfrid Lawson, MP (1829–1906) who was president of the organisation from 1879 until his death in 1906.

== Later history ==
In 1942, the Alliance became a limited company, the UK Temperance Alliance Ltd. By the 1970s the main role of the Alliance was educational work and its interest had broadened to other areas of addiction besides alcohol (much of which is undertaken by the Institute of Alcohol Studies (IAS), a trading arm of the Alliance. In 2003, the UK Temperance Alliance was renamed the Alliance House Foundation.

National Temperance Federation (NTF) was reconstituted at its annual meeting in 1936, and declared its policy as the representation of every section of the temperance movement of approximately three million members of temperance organisations throughout the country.

In 1942 it was renamed to United Kingdom Temperance Alliance Ltd and in 2003 was again renamed to the Alliance House Foundation.

The Alliance's theory of social rights came under attack from John Stuart Mill in his On Liberty.
