= James Scholefield (Bible Christian) =

English minister and social reformer (1790–1855)

The Reverend James Scholefield
- Born: 6 April 1790; Colne Bridge, Kirkheaton, Yorkshire, England
- Died: 24 April 1855 (aged 65); Manchester, England
- Burial place: Every Street Churchyard, Ancoats
- Education: Salford Grammar School and Academy of Sciences
- Occupations: Bible Christian Church minister; social reformer; undertaker; medical practitioner
- Known for: Founding Christ Church Chapel, Ancoats; Involvement in Manchester radical reform; Advocacy of vegetarianism and temperance

James Scholefield (6 April 1790 – 24 April 1855) was an English Bible Christian minister, social reformer, undertaker, and medical practitioner. He founded Christ Church Chapel in Every Street, Ancoats, Manchester, and was associated with vegetarianism, temperance, and radical reform movements in nineteenth-century Manchester.

== Biography ==
=== Early life and ministry ===
James Scholefield was born at Colne Bridge, in the parish of Kirkheaton, Yorkshire, on 6 April 1790. In 1809, he joined the newly established Bible Christian Church, a nonconformist sect founded by William Cowherd. He was educated at Cowherd's Salford Grammar School and Academy of Sciences, where the curriculum included physical science, medicine, astronomy, Latin, Hebrew, and Greek.

In 1813, Scholefield was ordained as a minister in the denomination and served at Christ Church in Hulme until 1823. In 1824, he founded Christ Church Chapel in Every Street, Ancoats, Manchester. He was a committed teetotaller and vegetarian.

Around 1851, Scholefield published a pamphlet advocating vegetarianism. It was translated into German by Emil Weilshäuser as "Der Meusch—Kieu Raubthier". His religious teaching connected abstinence from alcohol and meat with moral and physical reform.

=== Undertaking and medical practice ===
Scholefield did not receive payment for his religious work and supported himself through other occupations. He worked as an undertaker and managed a large graveyard adjoining his chapel. He developed the "Safety tomb", intended to protect graves from robbers.

Scholefield also practised medicine. Although he was not formally qualified, he studied medicine and began practice before the Medical Act 1858, which introduced formal registration for medical practitioners. He treated working-class patients in Ancoats and sold a proprietary remedy known as "Scholefield's Cholera Mixture", which remained in use for several decades.

=== Radical reform ===
Scholefield was involved in radical reform movements in Manchester. He was present at the Peterloo Massacre in 1819. In 1842, he commissioned an obelisk in memory of Henry Hunt, the radical politician associated with the Peterloo meeting. In the same year, he allowed a Chartist conference to meet in his chapel. He was tried at the Lancaster Assizes in 1843 for permitting the meeting, but was acquitted.

In later life, Scholefield was active in the Manchester Vegetarian Society, the Short Time movement for shorter working hours, and the Parliamentary and Financial Reform Association. The association brought together reformers including Richard Cobden, John Bright, Joseph Hume, and Feargus O'Connor.

== Death and legacy ==
Scholefield died on 24 April 1855 and was buried in Every Street Churchyard, Ancoats. His gravestone is the only one from that period that remains intact. The Every Street chapel later became associated with the University of Manchester Settlement.

In 1934, Mary Stocks wrote and produced a play about Scholefield's life, which was performed in the chapel.

== See also ==
- Christian vegetarianism
- History of vegetarianism
- Vegetarianism in the Victorian era
- Vegetarianism in the United Kingdom
- Temperance movement in the United Kingdom
