= John Frank Newton =

British vegetarianism activist and Zoroastrian (1767–1837)

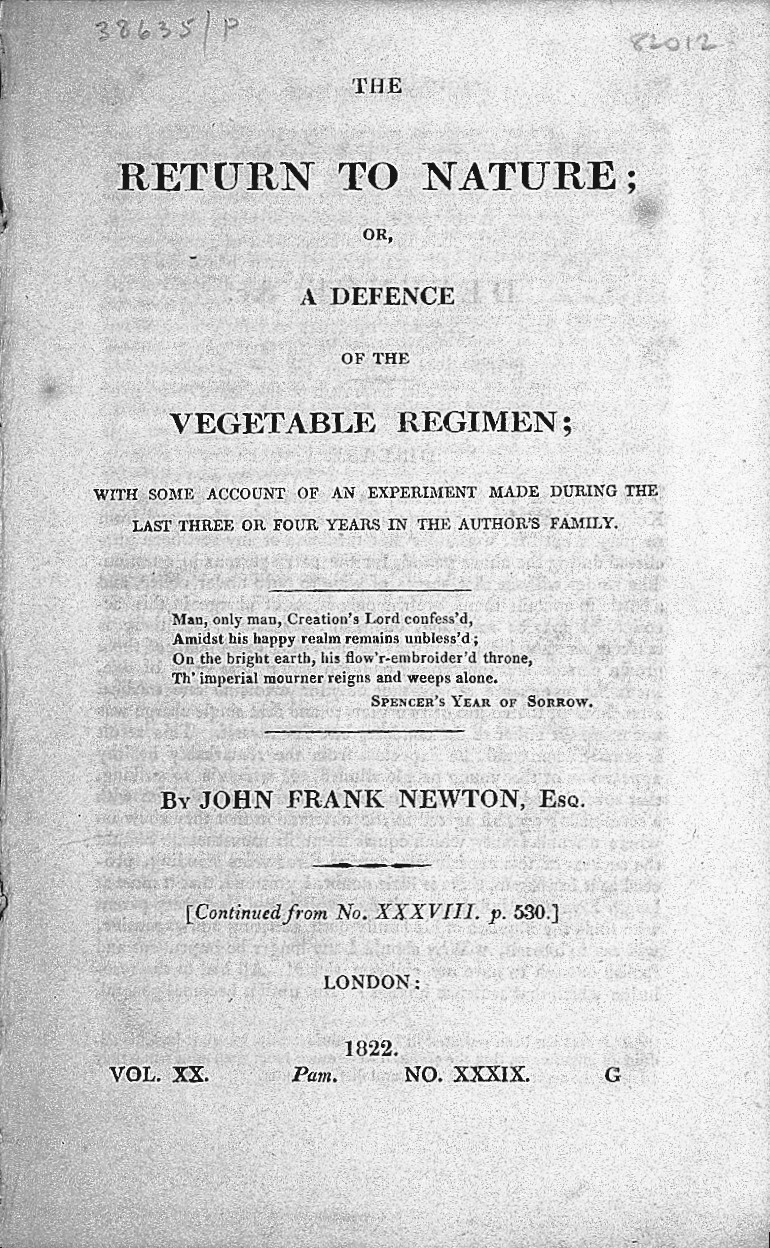
Newton's Return to Nature, 1822 edition

John Frank Newton (1767 – 1837) was a British vegetarianism activist and Zoroastrian.

== Biography ==
Newton was born at St. Christopher in the West Indies in 1767. Newton was a patient of physician William Lambe. He was inspired by the vegetable and distilled water diet of Lambe. Newton was married to Cornelia Collins. In 1811, Newton authored Return to Nature: Or a Defence of the Vegetable Regimen. Newton's book was written to popularize the research of William Lambe. He promoted a "regimen of distilled water and vegetable diet." He believed that vegetables are the natural food of man and animal flesh is unhealthy and unnatural.

Newton recommended people to utilize distillation apparatus for their water. He resided at Chester Street, Belgravia and argued that the water from the River Thames was polluted by "animal oil" and "septic matter". His diet was ovo-lacto vegetarian and consisted of fruits, vegetables, raisins, toasted bread, distilled water, eggs, milk and potatoes. Twenty-five people were practicing the diet in 1811, including seven from Newton's own household and all reported good health. Newton's book inspired John Snow to adopt the diet. Unlike William Lambe, Newton was not a vegan. Newton commented that:

Our breakfast is composed of dried fruits, whether raisins, figs, or plums, with toasted bread or biscuits, and weak tea, always made of distilled water, with a moderation portion of milk in it... When butter is added to the toast, it is in a very small quantity. The dinner consists of potatoes, with some other vegetables, according as they happen to be in season, macaroni, a tart, or a pudding, with as few eggs in it as possible: to this is sometimes added a dessert.

Newton met Percy Bysshe Shelley during 1812–1813 during the salons held at Harriet de Boinville's house in Berkshire and influenced his views on vegetarianism. Historian Keith Thomas has noted that Newton's Return to Nature "provided much of the basis" for Shelley's book, A Vindication of Natural Diet.

Newton wrote a series of articles in The Monthly Magazine in 1812 which mention vegetarian dieting and the zodiac. Newton was a Zoroastrian and discussed the subject with his friend Thomas Love Peacock, in 1813. However, he did not write about the subject. Historian Stuart Curran has written that Newton's "vegetarianism was both radical in its political implications and extraordinarily learned in its sources. Newton was obviously aware that both Zoroastrian and Indian religion enjoined a vegetable diet, but he grafted to his amalgamation a primitive zodiacal astrology."

Lafayette Mendel credits Newton for starting the modern vegetarian movement.

== Selected publications ==
- Return to Nature: Or a Defence of the Vegetable Regimen (1811)

== See also ==
- George Nicholson
