= Frederic Richard Lees =

English activist, writer, and editor (1815–1897)

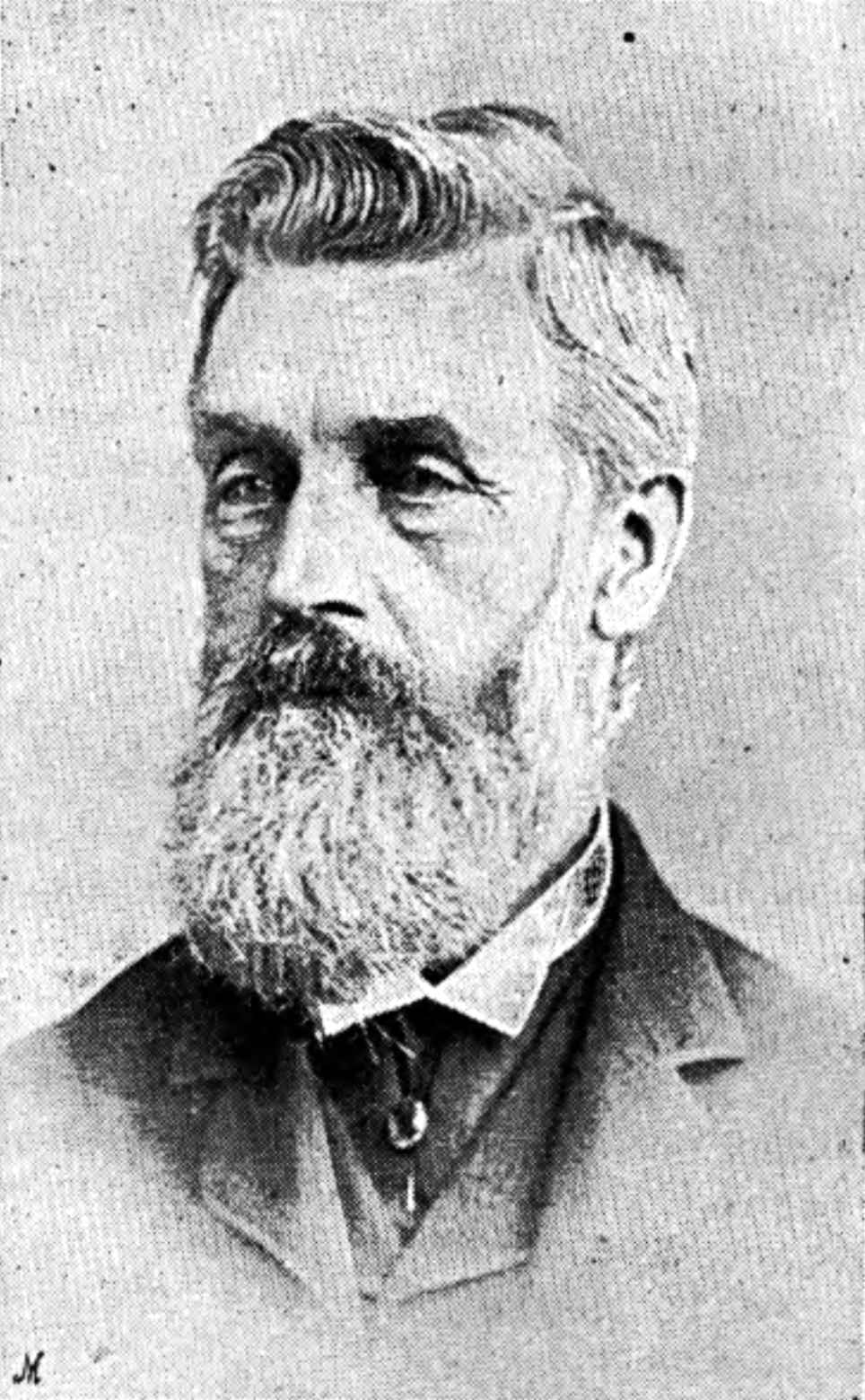
- Lees, c. 1895
- Born: 15 March 1815; Meanwood, England
- Died: 29 May 1897 (aged 82); Halifax, West Yorkshire, England
- Occupations: Temperance and vegetarianism advocate; writer; editor
- Spouses: Mercy Joanna Jowett (m. 1838; died 1870) Sarah Barnesley (m. 1878; died 1889)
- Children: 2

Signature
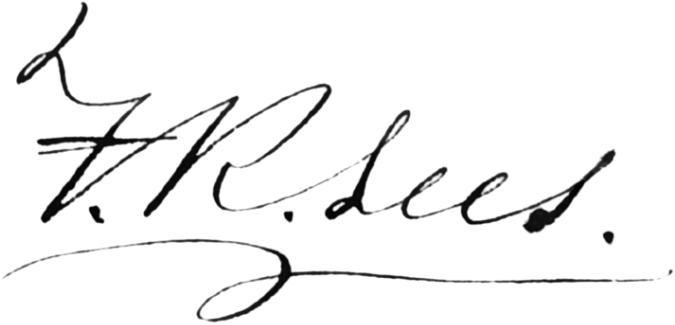

Frederic Richard Lees (15 March 1815 – 29 May 1897) was an English temperance and vegetarianism advocate, writer, and editor. He worked in the British temperance movement from the 1830s, edited several temperance periodicals, and was a founding member of the United Kingdom Alliance. Lees also lectured on vegetarianism, won a Vegetarian Society essay competition in 1857, and became an associate member of the society in 1874.

== Life and career ==
Lees was born in Meanwood, near Leeds, on 15 March 1815. He signed the antispirits pledge in 1832 and became a teetotaller in 1835.

In 1837, Lees became secretary of the British Association for the Promotion of Temperance, later known as the British Temperance League, and edited its journal from 1840 to 1844. He also edited the Truth-Seeker from 1844 to 1850, the Teetotal Topic in 1847, and the Temperance Spectator in 1859. He was a founding member of the United Kingdom Alliance in 1863.

Lees was also a vegetarian and lectured on vegetarianism. In 1857, he won a Vegetarian Society essay competition for "An Argument on Behalf of the Primitive Diet of Man", which was republished in 1884. He became an associate member of the Society in 1874.

Lees received an honorary doctorate from the University of Giessen for his writings against Owenism.

== Personal life and death ==
Lees married Mercy Joanna Jowett (d. 1870) in 1838. They had two children: Frederic Arnold (1847–1921) and Mary Eleanor. On 22 October 1878, he married Sarah Barnesley (née Brooks; d. 1889) at St Peter's Church, Leeds.

Lees died in Halifax, West Yorkshire, on 29 May 1897. He was buried at Meanwood on 1 June.

== Publications ==
- Owenism Dissected (1838)
- An Argument on Behalf of the Primitive Diet of Man (1857)
- Essays Physiological and Critical on the Principles of Temperance (1857)
- National Temperance Testimonial of One Thousand Guineas to Dr. Frederic Richard Lees (1860)
- An Inquiry into the Reasons and Results of the Prescription of Intoxicating Liquors in the Practice of Medicine (1866)
- Textbook of Temperance (1869)
- The Temperance Bible-commentary: Giving at One View, Version, Criticism, and Exposition, in Regard to All Passages of Holy Writ Bearing on "Wine" and "Strong Drink", or Illustrating the Principles of the Temperance Reformation (1870)
- The Science Temperance Text-Book (1884)
- The Temperance Movement and its Workers: A Record of Social, Moral, Religious, and Political Progress (with Peter Turner Winskill, 1891)

== See also ==
- Temperance movement in the United Kingdom
- History of vegetarianism
- Vegetarianism in the Victorian era
- Vegetarianism in the United Kingdom
