= Jean-Antoine Gleizes =

French writer and activist (1773–1843)

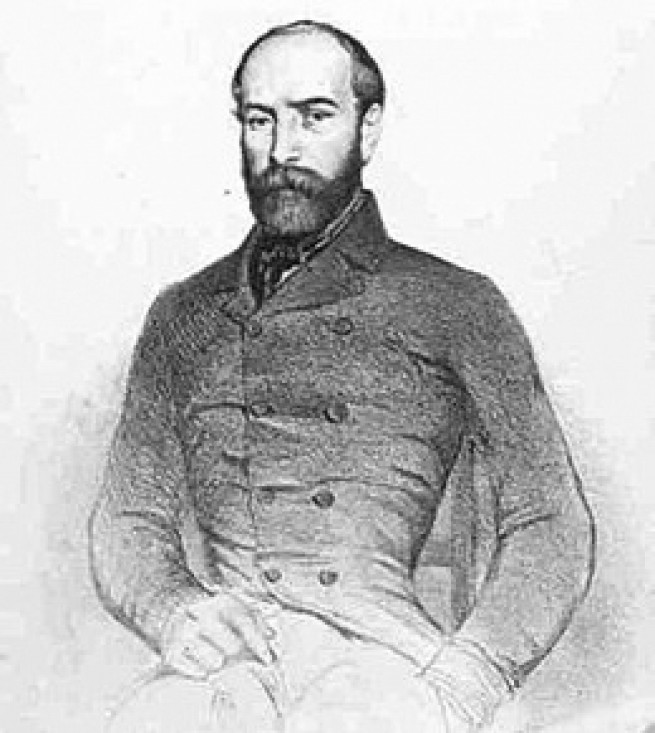
- Born: Jean Antoine Gleïzès; 26 December 1773; Dourgne, Tarn, France
- Died: 17 June 1843 (aged 69); Mazères, Ariège, France
- Occupations: Philosopher, writer, activist
- Known for: Advocacy of vegetarianism
- Notable work: Thalysie: ou la Nouvelle Existence

Jean-Antoine Gleizes (26 December 1773 – 17 June 1843) was a French philosopher, writer, and early advocate of vegetarianism. He was extremely popular and influential at his time. His best known work is Thalysie: the New Existence.

== Biography ==
Born in Dourgne, in the Tarn department of France, Gleizes initially pursued the study of medicine but abandoned it due to his profound aversion to vivisection and animal experimentation. Gleizes became deeply influenced by the revolutionary ideals of the late 18th century, though he retreated from public life during the French Revolution, disillusioned by its violence. Instead, he devoted himself to philosophical and literary pursuits, focusing on humanity's relationship with nature and the moral implications of meat consumption. He argued that the killing of animals was a main source of crime.

In 1798, Gleizes made a personal decision to reject meat entirely, adopting a diet based solely on milk, fruits, and vegetables, which he strictly adhered to for the rest of his life. His vegetarianism was rooted in his belief that humanity's consumption of animal flesh was incompatible with moral and spiritual progress. He expressed these views in his writings, including Les Mélancolies d'un Solitaire and Thalysie: ou la Nouvelle Existence, where he argued that ethical diets were essential for the advancement of human civilization. Gleizes' works, though largely ignored in his lifetime, have since been recognized as important contributions to the early vegetarian movement.

Despite the lack of widespread recognition during his life, Gleizes influenced a small but dedicated group of intellectuals and reformers, including his brother and a few colleagues. His final work, Thalysie, published in two parts in 1840 and 1842, was his magnum opus, where he laid out a comprehensive argument for a peaceful coexistence between humans and animals, critiquing the moral failings of society's dietary habits. Gleizes died in 1843, disillusioned by the lack of support for his ideals, but his philosophical legacy lived on, particularly in the European vegetarian circles that emerged in the late 19th century.

== Selected publications ==
- Les nuits élyséennes, éd. Pierre Didot l'Ainé, Paris, 1801.
- Les Agrestes, éd. Fuchs, Paris, 1804.
- Le Christianisme expliqué, ou le Véritable esprit de ce culte méconnu jusqu'à ce jour, éd. Firmin-Didot, Paris, 1837.
- Séléna, ou la famille Samanéenne, éd. Des Forges, 1838.
- Thalysie; ou, La nouvelle existence (1840, vol. 1; 1841, vol. 2; 1842, vol. 3).
