= The Humanities of Diet =

1914 book by Henry S. Salt

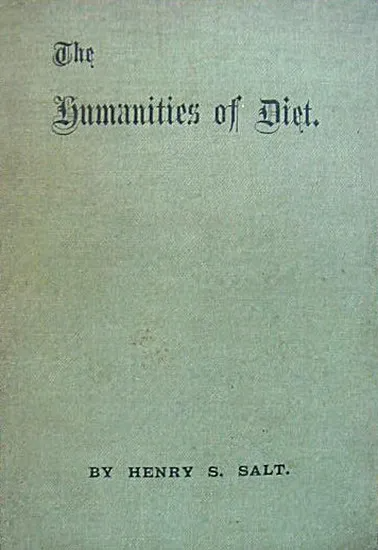
- First edition cover
- Author: Henry S. Salt
- Language: English
- Subject: Ethical vegetarianism; animal rights
- Genre: Essays; dialogues; poetry
- Publisher: Vegetarian Society
- Publication date: January 1914
- Publication place: United Kingdom of Great Britain and Ireland
- Media type: Print
- Pages: 70
- OCLC: 21491494

The Humanities of Diet: Some Reasonings and Rhymings is a 1914 book by the British writer and social reformer Henry S. Salt. Published in Manchester by the Vegetarian Society, it combines short essays, dialogues, and poems in support of ethical vegetarianism and animal rights. The book drew on Salt's earlier writings on the subject, including an article of the same name in The Fortnightly Review in 1896 and a pamphlet published by William Reeves in 1897, and added further material.

In later animal ethics writing, Salt's phrase "logic of the larder" has been used in discussions of the replaceability argument, the view that farmed animals can benefit from being bred for food if their lives are worth living.

== Background ==
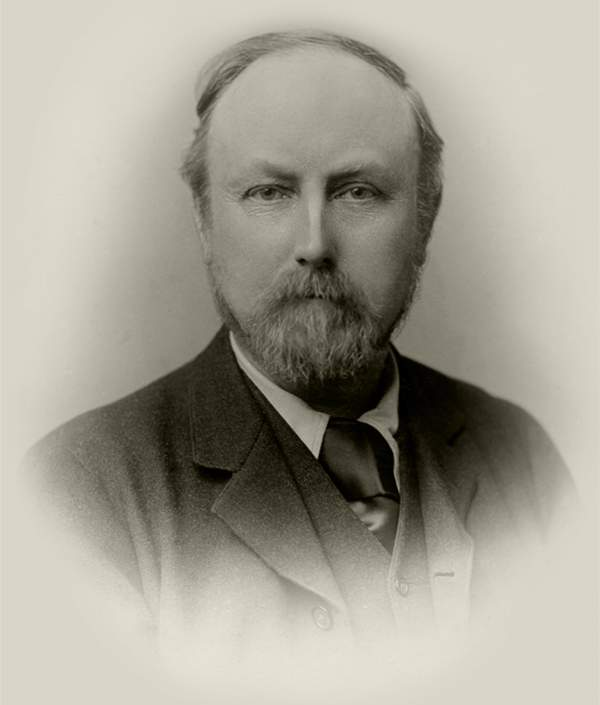
Henry S. Salt (1851–1939)

Henry S. Salt (1851–1939) was born in Naini Tal, India, and educated at Eton College and King's College, Cambridge. He taught classics at Eton from 1875 to 1884, then settled at Tilford in Surrey, where he became a vegetarian and wrote on humanitarianism and social reform.

During the late 1880s and 1890s, Salt published pamphlets and books on vegetarianism and animal rights, including Flesh or Fruit? An Essay on Food Reform (1888) and Animals' Rights Considered in Relation to Social Progress (1892). His later writing also addressed corporal punishment, literary subjects, and political topics.

== Publication history ==
Salt published an article titled "The Humanities of Diet" in The Fortnightly Review in September 1896. In 1897, it was expanded and reissued as a 22-page pamphlet, published in London by William Reeves as no. 23 in The Humanitarian League's Publications series.

In January 1914, the Vegetarian Society in Manchester published The Humanities of Diet: Some Reasonings and Rhymings, a 70-page volume that reprinted earlier writings by Salt alongside new material.

== Content ==
The book combines short essays, dialogues, and poems. Its themes include opposition to slaughter and meat-eating, criticism of indifference to animal suffering, and satire of arguments used to defend killing animals for food.

Several pieces present arguments about humane diet, including "The Humanities of Diet", "Grace Before Meat", "Logic of the Larder", and "The Moralist at the Shambles". Others use parody, dialogue, or character sketches, including "A Chat with Professor Grillman", "Paterfamilias at the Breakfast Table", and "Mr. Facing-Both-Ways". The volume also includes poems and dramatic pieces centred on animals and slaughter, including "A Cow Mourning for Her Calf", "The Dying Ox", and "Voices of the Voiceless", as well as seasonal or topical pieces including "The Joys of Christmas" and Christmas sketches.

== Reception ==
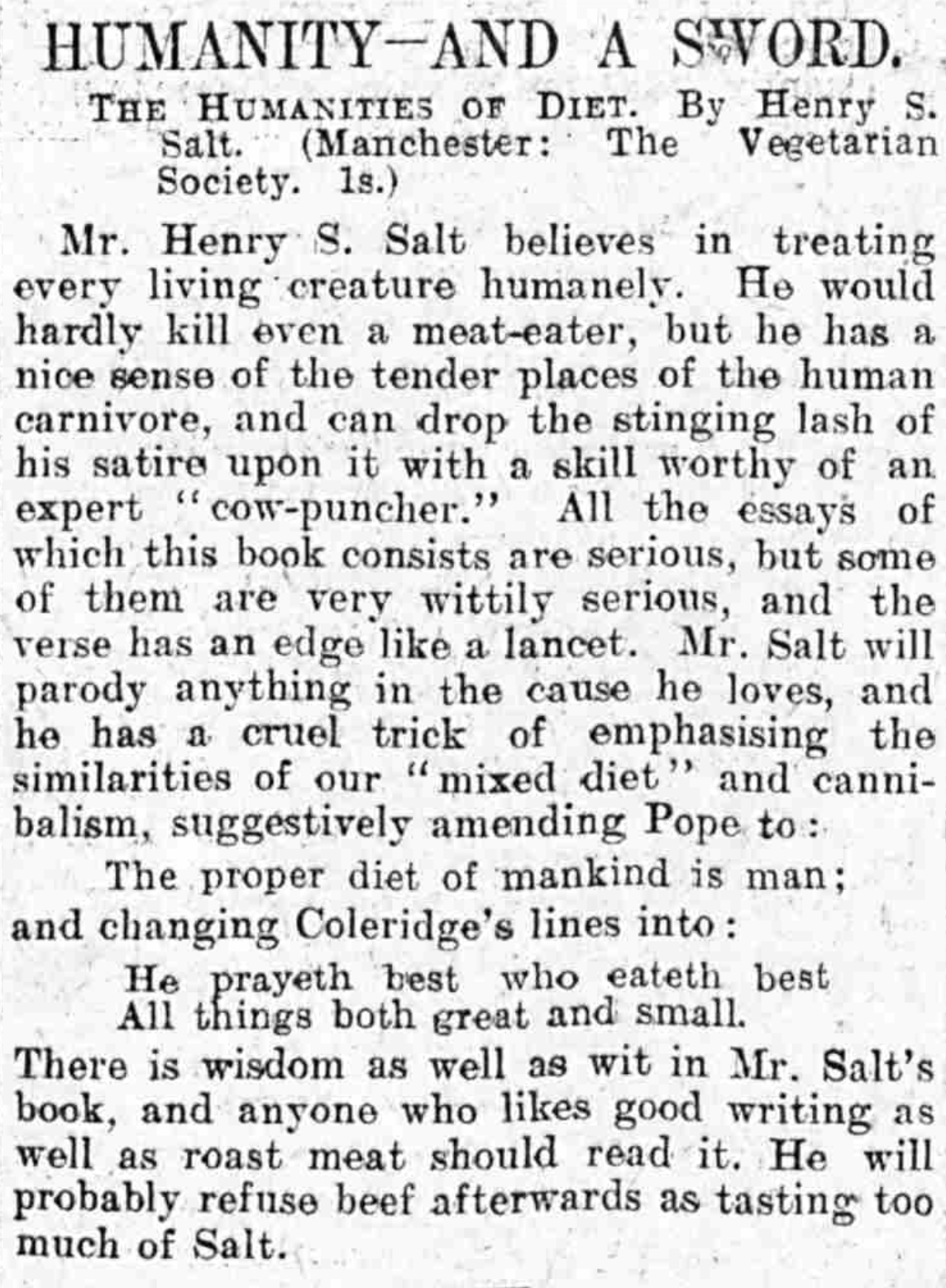
Manchester City News review, January 1914

Reviewing the book in January 1914, the Manchester City News described Salt as writing from a humane opposition to meat-eating, using satire and parody against "the human carnivore". It described the essays as serious, though often "very wittily serious", and praised the verse as sharp-edged. The review noted Salt's comparison between a "mixed diet" and cannibalism, and concluded that the book combined "wisdom as well as wit".

The Vegetarian Messenger and Health Review described the book as a contribution to vegetarian literature, quoting Salt's description of opposition to flesh-eating as a protest against a practice he called a "relic of savagery". The review also commented on the book's physical production, describing it as well printed and bound in green cloth to match earlier Vegetarian Society editions of Salt's work.

== Legacy ==
In animal ethics, the replaceability argument holds that farmed animals can be said to benefit from being bred for food, because demand for meat is the reason they are brought into existence. On this view, if such animals have lives worth living, replacing animal products with alternatives can be presented as depriving them of lives. Salt is credited with using the phrase "logic of the larder" for this position in The Humanities of Diet.

== See also ==
- Books by Henry Stephens Salt
- Bibliography of veganism and vegetarianism
- History of animal rights
- History of vegetarianism
- Vegetarianism in the Victorian era
- The Ethics of Diet – 1883 book by Howard Williams
