= A Vindication of Natural Diet =

1813 pamphlet by Shelley

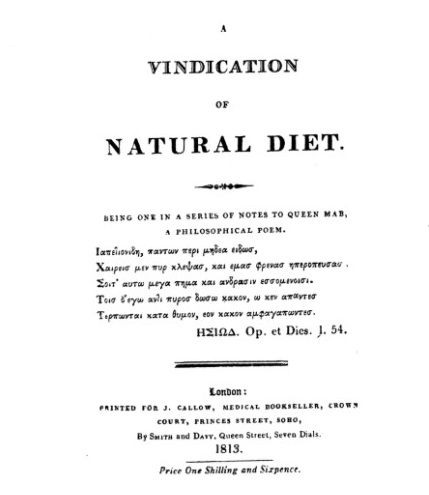
- First edition title page
- Author: Percy Bysshe Shelley
- Language: English
- Subject: Vegetarianism, animal ethics
- Genre: Pamphlet
- Published: 1813
- Publisher: J. Callow
- Publication place: United Kingdom of Great Britain and Ireland
- Pages: 18
- OCLC: 503858135

A Vindication of Natural Diet is an 1813 pamphlet by Romantic poet and vegan activist Percy Bysshe Shelley on vegetarianism and animal ethics. It was first written as part of the notes to Queen Mab, which was privately printed in 1813. Later in the same year the essay was separately published as a pamphlet by J. Callow in London.

It is a foundational essay advocating for vegetarianism, maintaining that a plant-based diet is essential for bodily health, moral virtue, and social justice. Shelley argued that meat consumption is unnatural, a "slow but certain poison", causing disease, which "pollutes" the body, and leads to vice and depravity. He prescribes the return to a "natural" vegetable diet.

This work is regarded as one of the earliest and most fervent defenses of vegetarianism in English literature.

== Background ==
Shelley wrote four essays on the subject of vegetarianism, "A Vindication of Natural Diet" (1813), the note in Queen Mab, in a section of A Refutation of Deism (1814), and "On the Vegetable System of Diet", which was published posthumously in 1929.

Shelley first experimented with a vegetarian diet while at the University of Oxford according to Thomas Jefferson Hogg. Shelley began a vegetarian diet on 1 March 1812 along with his first wife Harriet Westbrook. Shelley began composing the essay in October–November 1812. Shelley met John Frank Newton during 1812-1813 and influenced his views on vegetarianism. Historian Keith Thomas has noted that Newton's Return to Nature "provided much of the basis" for Shelley's A Vindication of Natural Diet.

The work has been republished since 1813, beginning with an abridged version which was published in Boston by March, Capen, and Lyon in an American collection Vegetable Diet: As Sanctioned by Medical Men, and by Experience in All Ages, edited by William A. Alcott.

The essay was reprinted in 1884 in a new edition in London by Frederick Pitman and by John Heywood and the Vegetarian Society in Manchester. The original title page was reproduced: A Vindication of Natural Diet. Being One in a Series of Notes to Queen Mab (A Philosophical Poem). London: Printed for J. Callow by Smith & Davy, 1813. The new edition featured a preface by Henry Stephens Salt and William Axon. A second edition appeared in 1886.

In 1904, the work was republished in London by C. W. Daniel as A Vindication of Natural Diet and Extracts from the Works of Dr. Lambe, edited and annotated by F. E. Worland.

== Vegetarianism ==
Shelley wrote in A Vindication of Natural Diet: "It is only by softening and disguising dead flesh by culinary preparation that it is rendered susceptible of mastication or digestion, and that the sight of its bloody juices and raw horror does not excite intolerable loathing and disgust."

Shelley used the imagery of slaughtering a lamb. In Queen Mab: A Philosophical Poem (1813) he wrote about the change to a vegetarian diet using the lamb imagery: "And man ... no longer now/ He slays the lamb that looks him in the face,/ And horribly devours his mangled flesh."

In the novel Frankenstein; or, The Modern Prometheus (1818), which he is acknowledged to have contributed to, the Being is portrayed as a vegetarian. The lamb imagery is retained. The Being explained his vegetarian diet to Victor Frankenstein: "My food is not that of man. I do not destroy the lamb and the kid to glut my appetite; acorns and berries afford me sufficient nourishment." Shelley's views on vegetarianism are routinely incorrectly attributed to his wife.

In "The Sensitive Plant" he argued that all life forms, including "all killing insects and gnawing worms,/ And things of obscene and unlovely forms", have a natural role to play in the ecosystem which requires understanding rather than destruction, because what they do "although they did ill, was innocent".

In Laon and Cythna, republished as The Revolt of Islam (1817), Fifth Canto, the Festival of nations held after the Revolution is a banquet where no meat is served. The feast is vegetarian: "Never again may blood of bird or beast/ Stain with its venomous stream a human feast". This is "The banquet of the free" where the guests are described as "reclining as they ate, of Liberty,/ And Hope, and Justice". The festival was not polluted by gore, "But piled on high, an overflowing store/ Of pomegranates, and citrons, fairest fruit,/ Melons, and dates, and figs, and many a root".

Shelley argued that eating meat was unnatural. He maintained that diseases and immorality arose from mankind's "unnatural habits of life". A meatless diet was the best regimen for maintaining a healthy and disease-free lifestyle. He wrote that human diseases could be decreased by a return to a natural vegetable diet. Shelley argued that eating meat was a practice that polluted the body with syphilis and resulted in other ailments. In A Vindication of Natural Diet he wrote, "Should ever a physician be born with the genius of Locke, I am persuaded that he might trace all bodily and mental derangements to our unnatural habits," these unnatural habits being the consumption of meat. He cited the allegory of Prometheus who stole fire from the gods which enabled mankind to cook meat, thereby screening the disgust and horror of dead flesh. Shelley also compared a meat diet to alcoholism, inquiring, "How many thousands have become murderers and robbers, bigots and domestic tyrants, dissolute and abandoned adventurers, from the use of fermented liquors?" Shelley used comparative anatomy to show that the human digestive system resembles that of frugivorous or plant-eating animals. He concluded that a person with compassion and empathy for animals, "rising from a meal of roots", would be able to maintain a healthy and balanced diet and lifestyle. Shelley presented examples of how a vegetarian diet resulted in longevity and an increased lifespan. The only threat of death will be that of natural, old age, that "old age would be our last and our only malady". The two rules he prescribes for a natural diet are to never eat anything that was alive and to drink only distilled water.

== See also ==
- Shelley's Vegetarianism, 1891 pamphlet

== Sources ==
- Canani, Marco. "Percy Bysshe Shelley, a vegetarian poet." Not just Porridge: English Literati at Table (2017): 57.
- Chapin, Lisbeth. "Science and Spirit: Shelley's Vegetarian Essays and the Body as Utopian State." A Brighter Morn: The Shelley Circle's Utopian Project. Edited by Darby Lewes. Lanham, MD: Lexington Books, 2003.
- Clark, David Lee. "The Date and Source of Shelley's A Vindication of Natural Diet." Studies in Philology 36.1 (1939): 70-76.
- Favazza, Claudio. "Shelley, a Diet for Peace." The Keats-Shelley Review 38.1 (2024): 7-16.
- Jones, Michael Owen. "In Pursuit of Percy Shelley, 'The First Celebrity Vegan': An Essay on Meat, Sex, and Broccoli." Journal of Folklore Research: An International Journal of Folklore and Ethnomusicology 53.2 (2016): 1-30.
- Marino, Elisabetta. "The Legacy of Shelley’s Vegetarianism: From Henry Stephens Salt to Gandhi." de genere-Rivista di studi letterari, postcoloniali e di genere (Of the Genre - Journal of literary, postcolonial and gender studies) (2026): 83-95.
- Metcalfe, Ella. "Making Aliens of Us: Self-Serving Vegetarianism in Percy Bysshe Shelley’s ‘A Vindication of Natural Diet’ and Desmond Stewart’s ‘The Limits of Trooghaft’." Leviathan: Interdisciplinary Journal in English 8 (2022): 1-10.
- Morton, Timothy, "Joseph Ritson, Percy Shelley and the Making of Romantic Vegetarianism." Romanticism, Vol. 12, Issue 1, 2006. pp. 52–61.
- Morton, Timothy. Shelley and the Revolution in Taste: The Body and the Natural World. Cambridge University Press, 1994.
- Oerlemans, Onno. "Shelley's ideal body: Vegetarianism and nature." Studies in Romanticism 34.4 (1995): 531-552.
- Ngide, Ewane George. "Dynamic organicism and the romantic imagination: Shelley’s vegetarianism as nonviolence." International Journal of English and Literature. Vol. 4(4), pp. 94-101, June, 2013.
- Preece, Rod. Sins of the Flesh: A History of Ethical Vegetarian Thought. Vancouver, BC, Canada: University of British Columbia Press, 2008.
- Shelley, Percy Bysshe, "A Vindication of Natural Diet;" London: Smith & Davy. 1813, pp. 1–36.
- Spencer, Colin. The Heretic's Feast: A History of Vegetarianism. Great Britain: Hartnolls Ltd, Bodmin. 1993, pp 244–45.
- Tobias, Michael Charles, and Jane Gray Morrison. "Shelley’s Ecological Exile and His Utopia of Animal Rights." On the Nature of Ecological Paradox. Cham: Springer International Publishing, 2021. 341-350.
- Vaughan, Percy. Early Shelley Pamphlets. London: Watts and Co., 1905.
