= Replaceability argument =

Philosophical argument against vegetarianism

The replaceability argument, or the logic of the larder, is a philosophical argument against vegetarianism. It holds that consuming animal products can benefit animals because, if they were not consumed, fewer animals would be brought into existence. The argument has been discussed especially in utilitarian ethics.

== History ==
=== Early utilitarian formulations ===
In 1789, the utilitarian philosopher Jeremy Bentham endorsed a version of the argument. He contended that painless killing of a nonhuman animal could be beneficial overall because it did not harm the animal, while the people who ate the animal's body were made better off.

=== Late 19th-century debate ===
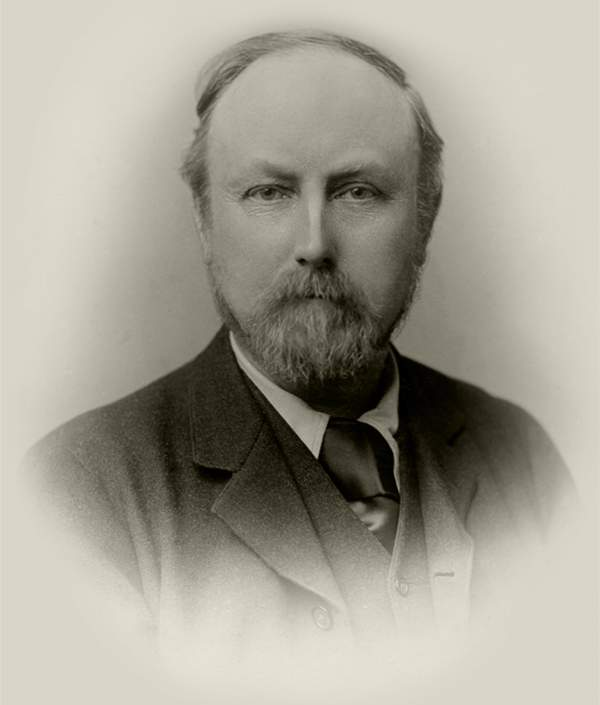
Henry Stephens Salt termed the replaceability argument the "logic of the larder"

==== Ritchie and Stephen ====
In 1895, the philosopher David George Ritchie used the argument in response to claims made for vegetarianism by Henry Stephens Salt in Animals' Rights (1892), stating:

If all the world were Jews, it has been well said, there would be no pigs in existence; and if all the world were vegetarians, would there be any sheep or cattle, well cared for, and guarded against starvation?

In 1896, the writer Leslie Stephen described the "argument for humanity" as the weakest argument for vegetarianism and repeated Ritchie's argument, stating: "The pig has a stronger interest than anyone in the demand for bacon."

==== Salt's response ====
Salt responded to both authors in an 1896 article titled "The Philosopher and the Pig". He called their argument fallacious because it referred to "another existence" when the question concerned "this existence". He also argued that it could not be shown that it was an "advantage to the Pig to be born".

=== Salt's later treatment ===
In 1914, Salt published The Humanities of Diet, in which he again addressed the argument and called it the "logic of the larder". He described it as "the very negation of a true reverence for life; for it implies that the real lover of animals is he whose larder is fullest of them", and stated:

It is often said, as an excuse for the slaughter of animals, that it is better for them to live and to be butchered than not to live at all. Now, obviously, if such reasoning justifies the practice of flesh-eating, it must equally justify all breeding of animals for profit or pastime, when their life is a fairly happy one. ... In fact ... there is hardly any treatment that cannot be justified by the supposed terms of such a contract. Also, the argument must apply to mankind. ... The fallacy lies in the confusion of thought which attempts to compare existence with non-existence. A person who is already in existence may feel that he would rather have lived than not, but he must first have the terra firma of existence to argue from; the moment he begins to argue as if from the abyss of the non-existent, he talks nonsense, by predicating good or evil, happiness or unhappiness, of that of which we can predicate nothing.

=== Late 20th-century utilitarian discussion ===
==== Singer and Parfit ====
In Animal Liberation (1975), the utilitarian philosopher Peter Singer agreed with Salt's view. Singer later changed his position while writing Practical Ethics, after being influenced by Derek Parfit's discussion of "impersonal wrongs" and the nonidentity problem.

=== 21st-century treatments ===
In Killing Happy Animals (2013), the philosopher Tatjana Višak discusses the argument in relation to utilitarianism. She rejects the argument, holding that being brought into existence does not benefit animals.

== See also ==
- Antinatalism
- Ethics of eating meat

In humans:

- Deprivation argument, that being born is inherently advantageous to unborn children, as part of the philosophical aspects of the abortion debate
- Every Sperm Is Sacred, a satire about taking the deprivation argument to its extreme of using no contraception
