= Flesh or Fruit? An Essay on Food Reform =

1888 essay by Henry S. Salt

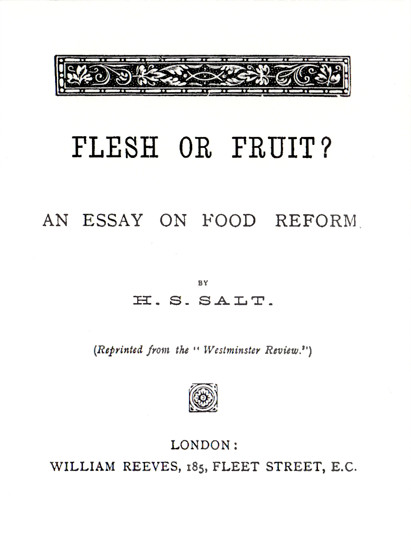
- First edition title page
- Author: Henry S. Salt
- Language: English
- Subject: Vegetarianism
- Publisher: William Reeves
- Publication date: 1888
- Publication place: United Kingdom of Great Britain and Ireland
- Media type: Print (pamphlet)
- Pages: 48
- OCLC: 316588055

"Flesh or Fruit? An Essay on Food Reform" is an 1888 essay on vegetarianism by the British writer and social reformer Henry S. Salt. First published in The Westminster Review, it was reprinted in London in 1888 as a 48-page pamphlet by William Reeves. The essay examines earlier arguments for vegetarianism and advocates a meat-free diet on humanitarian, dietary, hygienic and economic grounds. Salt discusses writers including Seneca, Plutarch, Porphyry, John Wesley, Michel de Montaigne, Sylvester Graham and Anna Kingsford, and responds to objections concerning human physiology, the natural world and the practical consequences of abandoning animal products. Contemporary reviews appeared in The Morning Post, Our Corner and The Westminster Review.

== Background and publication ==
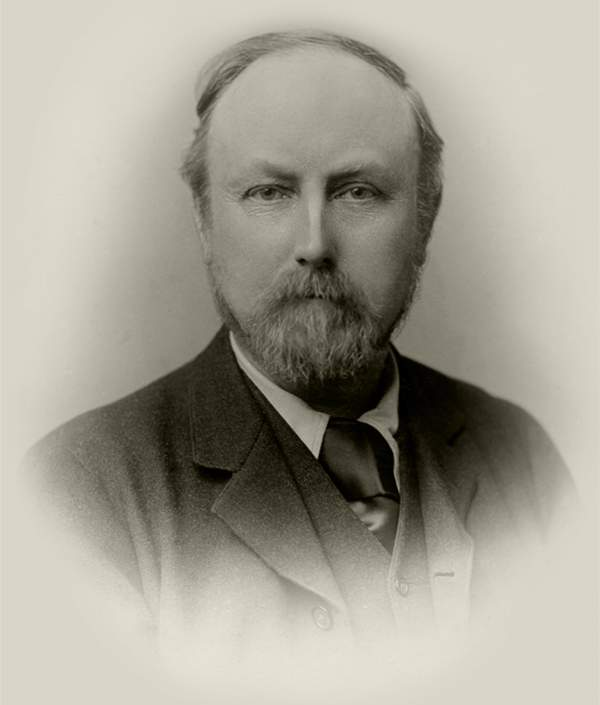
Henry S. Salt (1851–1939)

Henry S. Salt (1851–1939) was born at Naini Tal in India and educated at Eton College and King's College, Cambridge. He taught classics at Eton from 1875 to 1884, after which he settled in Tilford, Surrey, where he adopted a simple vegetarian way of life and concentrated on writing about humanitarian and social reform.

Salt had published an essay titled "Food Reform" in the October 1886 issue of The Westminster Review. The 1888 pamphlet Flesh or Fruit? was described as a reprint from the same periodical, both in a contemporary notice in The Westminster Review and in a later bibliography of vegetarian literature.

The pamphlet was published in London in 1888 by William Reeves and comprised 48 pages. It followed Salt's earlier publication A Plea for Vegetarianism and Other Essays (1886).

== Content ==
Salt surveys earlier arguments for vegetarianism, discussing writers including Seneca, Plutarch, Porphyry, John Wesley, Michel de Montaigne, Sylvester Graham and Anna Kingsford. He argues that abstaining from meat is necessary for consistently humane conduct and presents vegetarianism as preferable on grounds of taste, health and economy.

The essay also addresses objections to vegetarianism. Salt considers arguments based on human anatomy, including the presence of canine teeth, and appeals to the behaviour of predatory animals in nature. He responds to claims that vegetarianism is difficult to maintain and considers practical questions about replacing animal-derived products such as leather, soap and candles. He also disputes the argument that raising animals for slaughter benefits them by providing them with an existence they would otherwise not have had.

== Reception ==
A notice in The Morning Post on 4 June 1888 summarised Salt's arguments for vegetarianism under four headings: humanitarian, dietary, hygienic and economic. The reviewer considered the arguments sufficient to warrant a "fair trial" of the diet.

A review in Our Corner described the pamphlet as a "thoughtful" and "careful" argument against meat consumption. The reviewer noted Salt's contention that abstaining from meat was necessary for people to be "truly and consistently humane", together with his arguments concerning taste, hygiene and economy. The review also observed that the second half of the essay was devoted to answering objections to vegetarianism.

An unsigned review in The Westminster Review expressed doubts about the persuasive force of Salt's humanitarian arguments. The reviewer suggested that considerations of taste and smell were more likely to influence dietary choices than appeals to sentiment, and predicted that moderation in meat consumption would become more widespread than complete abstinence. Although acknowledging arguments in favour of increasing the vegetable proportion of the diet, the reviewer maintained that vegetarian advocates would be more successful by appealing to practical advantages.

The essay was subsequently included in Charles R. Magel's 1989 reference work, Keyguide to Information Sources in Animal Rights.

== See also ==
- Bibliography of veganism and vegetarianism
- Vegetarianism in the Victorian era
- The Ethics of Diet – 1883 book by Howard Williams
