= A Plea for Vegetarianism and Other Essays =

1886 book by Henry S. Salt

- First edition cover
- Author: Henry S. Salt
- Language: English
- Subject: Vegetarianism, animal rights
- Genre: Essay collection
- Publisher: The Vegetarian Society
- Publication date: 1886
- Publication place: United Kingdom
- Media type: Print (paperback and hardback)
- Pages: 115
- OCLC: 1050804885
- Text: A Plea for Vegetarianism and Other Essays at Wikisource

A Plea for Vegetarianism and Other Essays is a 1886 essay collection by the British writer and social reformer Henry S. Salt. Published by the Vegetarian Society in Manchester, it sets out ethical, economic, aesthetic, and practical arguments for vegetarianism. It was Salt's first published book.

== Background ==
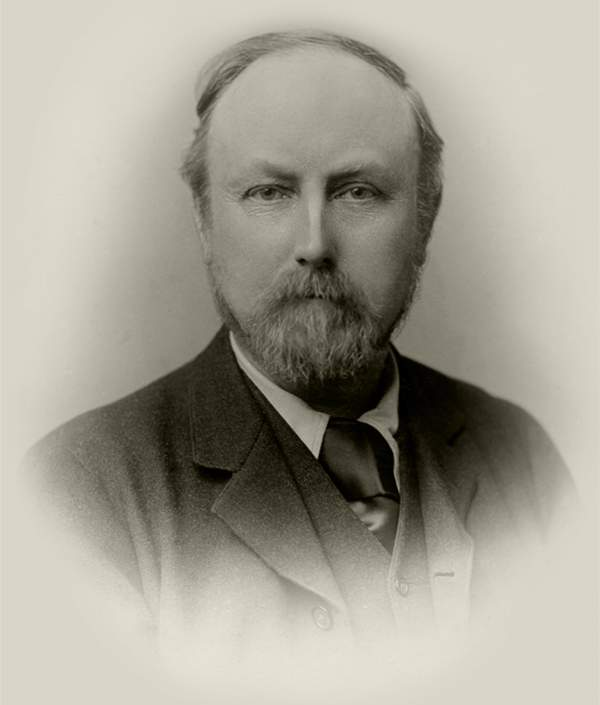
Henry S. Salt

Salt was active in a number of reform causes in the late 19th century, including prison reform, education, socialism, and animal protection. He later founded the Humanitarian League in 1891. In A Plea for Vegetarianism and Other Essays, he argued that a vegetarian diet was humane, economical, and practicable, and challenged common objections to abstention from meat.

A Plea for Vegetarianism and Other Essays was the first of 40 books by Salt.

== Publication ==
A Plea for Vegetarianism and Other Essays was published in 1886 by the Vegetarian Society, based at Princess Street, Manchester. The book was printed and distributed by John Heywood (Deansgate and Ridgefield, Manchester; and Paternoster Buildings, London) and F. Pitman (Paternoster Row, London). It was issued in paper covers at one shilling and in cloth at one shilling and sixpence.

== Summary ==
The volume contains ten essays:

1. "A Plea for Vegetarianism"
2. "Morality in Diet"
3. "Good Taste in Diet"
4. "Some Results of Food Reform"
5. "Medical Men and Food Reform"
6. "Sir Henry Thompson on 'Diet'"
7. "On Certain Fallacies"
8. "Sport"
9. "The Philosophy of Cannibalism"
10. "Vegetarianism and Social Reform"

Across these essays, Salt defends vegetarianism on ethical, social, and economic grounds. He argues against the killing of animals for food, disputes the view that meat is necessary for health, and links diet to wider questions of conduct and social reform. Several essays also attack blood sports and reply to objections made by critics of vegetarianism, including Sir Henry Thompson.

== Legacy ==
Themes developed in A Plea for Vegetarianism and Other Essays appeared again in Salt's later writings, including Animals' Rights: Considered in Relation to Social Progress (1892).

At a social meeting organised by the London Vegetarian Society on 20 November 1931, Gandhi said that Salt's A Plea for Vegetarianism had shown him that vegetarianism was "a moral duty" and not only a matter of custom or personal vow.

== See also ==
- Books by Henry Stephens Salt
- Bibliography of veganism and vegetarianism
- History of animal rights
- History of vegetarianism
- Vegetarianism in the Victorian era
- The Ethics of Diet – 1883 book by Howard Williams
