= Muriel Stanley Venne =

Canadian politician and activist (1937–2024)

Muriel Stanley Venne CM AOE
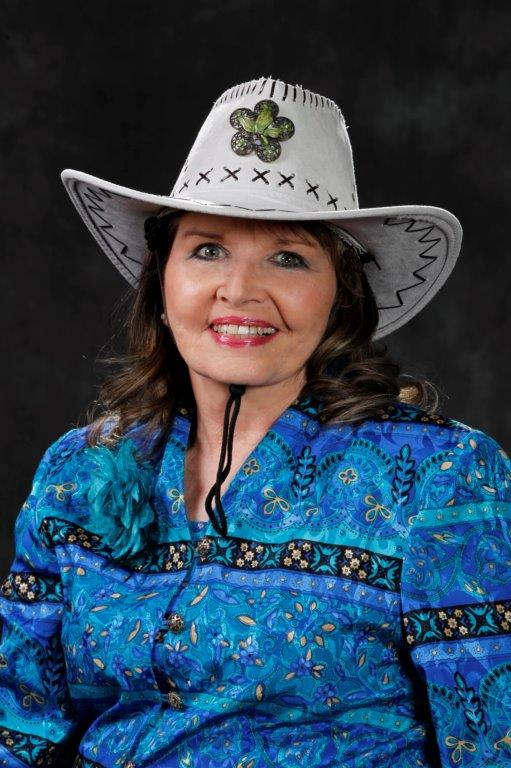
- Born: Muriel Esther Kopp; December 12, 1937; Lamont, Alberta, Canada
- Died: December 17, 2024 (aged 87); St. Albert, Alberta, Canada
- Education: Eastwood School, Edmonton
- Alma mater: University of Alberta; MacEwan University (honorary)
- Occupations: Métis community leader and Indigenous rights activist
- Employer: Alberta Human Rights Commission
- Organization(s): Métis Association of Alberta, Women of the Métis Nation, The Institute for the Advancement of Aboriginal Women
- Political party: New Democratic Party
- Children: 4

Muriel Stanley Venne CM AOE (née Kopp, 1937–2024) was a Canadian Métis community leader and Indigenous rights activist. She was one of the first seven members of the Alberta Human Rights Commission and was elected Vice President of the Métis Nation of Alberta. She founded The Institute for the Advancement of Aboriginal Women (IAAW) and Women of the Métis Nation.

== Early life and education ==
Venne was born in Lamont, Alberta, Canada in 1937 and moved to Edmonton as a child. She had a twin brother and they were the eldest of ten children in their family. Her family were Métis ironworkers that built skyscrapers in Edmonton.

Venne attended Eastwood School. When she was in Grade 10, Venne contracted tuberculosis (TB) and spent a year undergoing treatment at Aberhart Memorial Sanitorium in Edmonton. During this time, her uncle, aunt and their baby all died from TB.

Venne was married aged 17 and had four children, before her marriage ended due to domestic violence towards her.

Venne worked on upgrading courses by correspondence while she raised her children. She then studied an education degree at the University of Alberta, but had to leave before completing her degree for financial reasons.

== Career ==
=== Activism ===
After leaving university, Venne began working for the Métis Association of Alberta and established the "Edmonton Native Outreach Program."

In 1973, Venne was one of the first seven members appointed by Premier Peter Lougheed to the Alberta Human Rights Commission. During her term as President, Venne hosted the "Aboriginal Women’s Human Rights Symposium and the Gathering Our Strength – Violence Against Aboriginal Women Conference" in Edmonton.

Venne wrote The Rights Path, a booklet explaining human rights to all Indigenous Albertans. The booklet was endorsed by Mary Robinson, United Nations High Commissioner for Human Rights.

In 1993, Venne criticised how some communities and women were not represented at the Canada Royal Commission on Aboriginal People's National Round Table on Aboriginal Economic Development and Resources, asking why the panellists were all men and why no business women were asked to contribute.

In 1994, Venne founded The Institute for the Advancement of Aboriginal Women (IAAW). Venne campaigned with IAAW to raise awareness about the cases of Missing and Murdered Indigenous Women in Canada, highlighting that Indigenous women were murdered at disproportionate rates. She called out failures in specific cases due to systemic racism, in partnership with the Women’s Legal Action & Awareness Fund (LEAF), such as in the cases of Cindy Gladue, Colten Boushie and Tina Fontaine. With IAAW, Venne also established a community-based awards program for Indigenous women.

Venne founded the organisation Women of the Métis Nation, also known as Les Femmes Michif Otipemisiwak. She led the creation of the "Esquao Awards" in 1995 to recognise First Nation, Métis and Inuit women in Alberta, advocating for the reclamation of the word esquao (meaning woman in Cree) and the derogatory slur squaw by women.

In the early 2000s, Venne became active in the Alberta Labour History Institute (ALHI). In September 2008, Venne was elected Vice President of the Métis Nation of Alberta, serving in this role until 2012. She was a lifetime member of the Canadian Native Friendship Centre.

In 2010, Venne was awarded a Distinguished Citizen Honorary Bachelor of Arts Degree by MacEwan University.

In 2013, Venne presented about the state of Indigenous women's lives in Canada to United Nations Rapporteur James Anaya during his visit to Maskwacis, Alberta.

=== Political candidacy ===
Venne stood as a New Democratic Party candidate for the Edmonton-Meadowlark district in the 1986 Alberta general election, taking 20.04% of the vote. At the 1988 Canadian federal election she stood as a New Democratic Party candidate for the Yellowhead electoral district, taking 15.4% of the vote.

She stood as a New Democratic Party candidate for the new Edmonton-South West district in the 2012 Alberta general election, taking 8.61% of the vote.

== Death ==
Venne died in 2024, aged 87.

== Awards and honours ==
- Alberta Human Rights Award on the 25th anniversary of the Alberta Human Rights Commission (1998)
- Queen’s Commemoration Medal (2002)
- Appointed Member of the Order of Canada (2005), becoming the first Métis recipient.
- Governor General's Award in Commemoration of the Persons Case (2005)
- Woman of Vision award by Global Television Network (2007)
- Alberta Order of Excellence (2019)
- Aboriginal Role Model Lifetime Achievement Award
- National Aboriginal Achievement Award for Justice and Human Rights
- Queen Elizabeth II Golden Jubilee Medal
- Queen Elizabeth II Diamond Jubilee Medal

In October 2017, the Muriel Stanley Venne Provincial Centre building was named in her honour by the Province of Alberta. It was the first provincial building in Alberta to be named after an Indigenous woman.

In 2021, artist Amanta Scott painted a portrait of Venne titled Boudica Impression of Muriel Stanley Venne.

In 2022, a biography titled The Life and Legacy of Muriel Stanley Venne: A Métis Matriarch was written by Christine Mowat and was released by Heritage House Publishing. Venne was also featured in the 2021 book Stories of Métis Women: Tales My Kookum Told Me, part of the Indigenous Spirt of Nature series from Durvile and Uproute Books in Calgary.
