= Henry Salt =

Henry Salt may refer to:

- Henry Stephens Salt (1851–1939), English writer, campaigner for social reforms, vegetarian, and animal rights advocate
- Henry Salt (Egyptologist) (1780–1827), English artist, traveller, diplomat, and Egyptologist
- Mr. Salt (Mr. Henry Salt), fictional character from the children's book Charlie and the Chocolate Factory
