= James Leigh Joynes (clergyman) =

English clergyman and schoolmaster (1824–1908)

The Reverend James Leigh Joynes
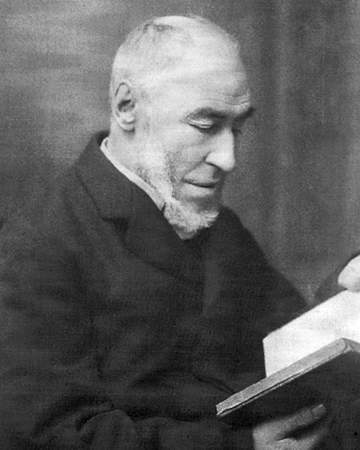
- Born: 27 September 1824; Frindsbury, Kent, England
- Died: 29 June 1908 (aged 83); Tunbridge Wells, Kent, England
- Resting place: Kent and Sussex Crematorium and Cemetery
- Education: Eton College; King's School, Rochester; King's College, Cambridge (B.A., 1848; M.A., 1851)
- Occupations: Clergyman; schoolmaster
- Spouse: Elisabeth Johanna Unger (m. 1851)
- Children: James Leigh Joynes Jr.
- Relatives: Henry Stephens Salt (son-in-law)

James Leigh Joynes (27 September 1824 – 29 June 1908) was an English clergyman and schoolmaster. Ordained in the Church of England in 1848, he served as a deacon and later as a priest. He taught at Eton College from 1849 to 1887 and became Lower Master in 1878. He was the father of James Leigh Joynes Jr. and the father-in-law of social reformer Henry Stephens Salt.

== Biography ==
=== Early life and education ===
Joynes was born in Frindsbury, Kent, on 27 September 1824. His father was Richard Symonds Joynes, the Rector of Gravesend. He was educated at Eton College and King's School, Rochester. He matriculated at King's College, Cambridge, in Easter 1844, became a scholar, won the Camden Medal in 1845, and graduated with a B.A. in 1848 and an M.A. in 1851. He was a Fellow of King's College from 1847 to 1850.

=== Career ===
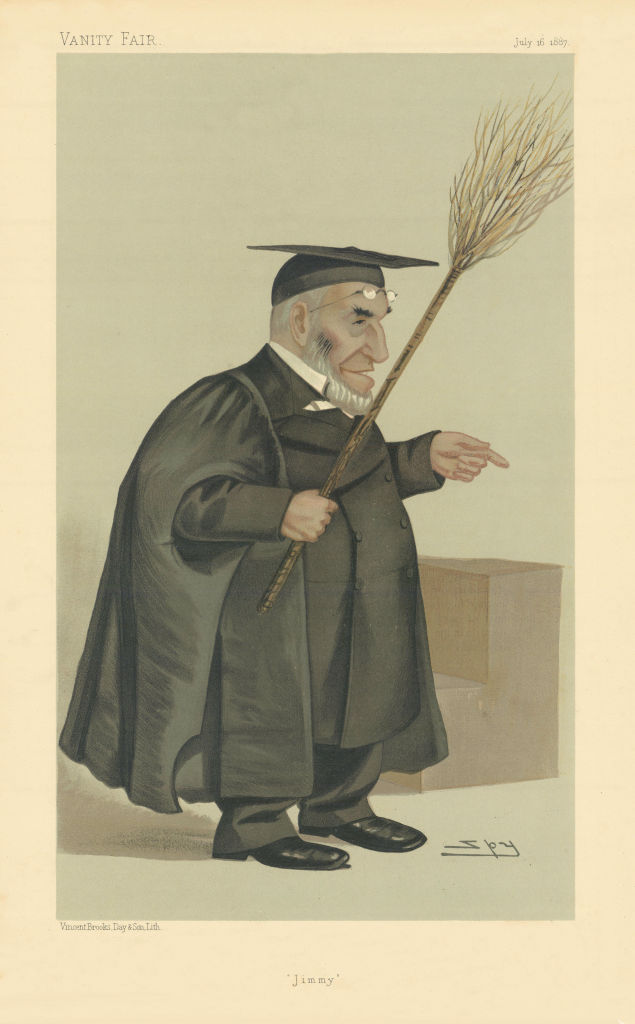
"Jimmy" by Leslie Ward, Vanity Fair, 1887

Joynes was ordained as a deacon in 1848 by the Bishop of Lincoln, John Kaye, and as a priest in 1854 by the Bishop of Oxford, Samuel Wilberforce.

Joynes taught at Eton College from 1849 to 1887 and became Lower Master in 1878. His pupils included A. C. Swinburne, Sidney Herbert, Lord Kinnaird, and the Duke of Argyll. Pupils referred to him as "Jimmy" or "old Jimmy". Peter Tupper described him as "notorious" for his use of flogging and birching to discipline students.

On his retirement in 1887, a caricature of Joynes brandishing a birch, by Leslie Ward, was published in Vanity Fair.

=== Personal life and death ===
Joynes married Elisabeth Johanna, daughter of Christopher Hermann Unger of Neuwied, Germany, on 22 April 1851, at St Peter's, Pimlico. He was the father of James Leigh Joynes Jr. and the father-in-law of Henry Stephens Salt.

Joynes died at Tunbridge Wells, Kent, on 29 June 1908. The funeral took place on 1 July, with his remains interred in the Kent and Sussex Crematorium and Cemetery. The Rev. D. J. Stather Hunt officiated at the graveside. Wreaths included one from Lord Kinnaird.
