= R. Allatini =

Austrian-British novelist

Rose Laure Allatini Scott
- Born: Rose Laure Allatini; 23 January 1890; Vienna, Austria-Hungary
- Died: 23 November 1980 (aged 90); Rye, Sussex, England
- Occupation: Writer
- Spouse: Cyril Scott
- Children: 2
- Relatives: Amanta Scott (granddaughter)
- Writing career
- Pen name: R. Allatini, A. T. Fitzroy, Mrs Cyril Scott, Lucian Wainwright, Eunice Buckley
- Language: English language
- Years active: 1914-1978

Rose Laure Allatini (23 January 1890 — 23 November 1980) was an Austrian-British novelist who wrote under the pseudonyms R. Allatini, A.T. Fitzroy, Mrs Cyril Scott, Lucian Wainwright, and Eunice Buckley. She is best known for her 1918 novel Despised and Rejected (written under the pen name A T Fitzroy), which was banned under the Defence of the Realm Act as it combines themes of pacifism and homosexuality which were thought "likely to prejudice the recruiting of persons to serve on His Majesty's Forces". Despised and Rejected was published by C. W. Daniel and was taken up by the Bloomsbury Group. The novel has been described by Angela K. Smith as drawing a connection between the persecution of homosexuals and the rhetoric of imperialism. It tells the story of a young woman's complex relationship with a homosexual composer who is conscripted for military service; his refusal leads to trial and imprisonment.

== Family ==
Rose Laure Allatini was born in Vienna, into a large and prosperous Jewish family. Her father, Roberto Allatini, was born in Thessaloniki, Ottoman Empire (now Greece) on 17 December 1856, to Moïse (Moses) Allatini (1809–1882) and Rosa Mortera (1819 – 1892); her mother, Bronislawa ("Bronia") Rapoport von Porada was born in Krakow, Poland (then under Austrian control) on 17 December 1869, to Arnold Rapoport, Edler von Porada (1840-1907) and Laura Rapoport Edlen von Porada (Eibenshutz). By 1911, Rose Laure Allatini, her sister Flore and their parents, Roberto and Bronislawa, were living at 18 Holland Park, London, and Robert Allatini was listed in the census as a retired merchant. In 1946, her mother (living at 61B Holland Park) renounced her Italian citizenship upon becoming a naturalized British citizen.

In May 1921, Allatini married the composer Cyril Scott, like her an enthusiast for Theosophy. They had two children, Vivien Mary born 1923 and Desmond Cyril (1926-2019), but separated in 1939, after the outbreak of WWII. Her son's memoir says that "Except for the war years 1939–45, which she spent with Melanie (J. M. A.) Mills ... in Beckley, a small village in Sussex, she lived in London, but every year for health reasons she went to Switzerland and Melanie accompanied her." Both Project Orlando and the Brighton Gay and Lesbian website Brighton Our Story, however, claim that she spent the remainder of her life living with Mills in Rye. In the summer of 1980 Rose Allatini moved from her home in London to a retirement home in the country near the home of her friend Melanie Mills.

She died on 23 November 1980 in Rye, Sussex and was buried in Hastings.

== Writing career ==
From 1914 to 1978, Allatini is known to have written nearly forty novels (some of them under the pseudonym 'Lucian Wainwright' and thirty under the name 'Eunice Buckley'), as well as writing short stories.

Allatini's favourite themes included illness and healing, music, early death, Jewish issues, and the occult.

=== Despised and Rejected ===
Her novel Despised and Rejected published in 1918 is set among pacifists during World War I. The sexuality of many of the characters in the book is represented as unstable, in a way unusual for the period. Antoinette, the main female character, at first has a passionate crush on an older woman, and then falls for Dennis, a homosexual who had previously courted her, partly as a disguise for his actual sexuality, and partly in the hope that she might 'cure' him. Dennis is a conscientious objector as well as a homosexual, and the combined themes of pacifism and sexual unorthodoxy made the book one that was bound to cause serious controversy in 1918. Rose Allatini submitted the manuscript to the firm of Allen & Unwin. Stanley Unwin rejected it because of its potential to cause scandal, but suggested that she send it to C.W. Daniel, a committed pacifist who had published several books highly critical of the war. It was decided to issue the book under the pseudonym of A.T. Fitzroy (because she lived in Fitzroy Square). When the book was published, it received unenthusiastic reviews, and some, like Allan Monkhouse, the critic of the Manchester Guardian, expressed a strong distaste for it:

But pacifism is not the main theme. The hero, Dennis Blackwood, walks and talks through a considerable portion of the book before a war breaks out and exhibits himself as a hopeless victim of neurasthenia. He is an abnormal young man, held up for pity as such, but also for admiration. Charity can go no further than look on him as an unhappy invalid. We have no intention of disclosing in what constitutes his abnormality. Those who read his story may regard his malady as ridiculous, others as something worse. A good laugh at Mr Fitzroy’s lack of humour where Dennis is concerned will disperse the rather unwholesome vapours. But what about a pacifist apostle who is so on the ground of abnormality? His whole case is given away.

A campaign to prosecute the book was instigated by journalist James Douglas, who previously incited the prosecution for indecency of The Rainbow by D.H. Lawrence. He wrote in the magazine London Opinion:

A thoroughly poisonous book, every copy of which ought to be put on the fire forthwith, is Despised and Rejected, by A.T. Fitzroy – probably a pen-name. Of its hideous immoralities the less said the better; but concerning its sympathetic presentation, in the mouths of its ‛hero’ and of other characters of pacifism and conscientious objection, and of sneering at the English as compared with the Hun, this needs to be asked: What is the use of our spending hundreds of thousands of pounds on propaganda, and tens of thousands more on Censorship, while pestiferous filth like this remains unsuppressed? The book is published by C.W. Daniel, Ltd., of Graham House, Tudor Street; and I imagine that it will not be long, after the authorities have examined this literary fungus, before he is a Daniel brought to judgment.

The book was tried at the City of London court at the Mansion House on 10 October 1918 and Daniel was fined £420 with £40 costs. After the trial, Daniel published a pamphlet defending himself against charges of immorality, and claiming that he had not realised the sexual implications of Allatini's book.

I was assured by the author that the love between the hero and his friend was analogous to that between David and Jonathan. I did not see what has since been pointed out – that certain passages are open to an immoral interpretation. Personally, I would rather that any book were burnt than that I should be party to lending support to depravity of either the homo-sexual or the contra-sexual types.

== Publications ==
=== As R. Allatini ===
- Happy Ever After Mills and Boon, 1914 (A young woman has ambitions to become a serious novelist, and comes in conflict with her family.)
- Payment, Andrew Melrose, 1915 (The upbringing and fate of a young man who, when war is declared, cannot face the thought of inflicting or suffering pain.)
- Root and Branch, George Allen and Unwin, 1917 ("A dramatic theme runs through the book, the ethical question as to whether a man may be justified in killing, at her passionate request, a woman dearly loved who is slowly dying of a terrible disease.")
- Requiem, Martin Secker, 1919. (A young man of mixed ancestry tries to work out who he really is and what he wants from life – and then the Great War happens.)
- When I was a Queen in Babylon Mills and Boon, 1921 (A young woman's strange behaviour distances her from her family. She is assessed by psychiatrists, but is saved by the intervention of a Theosophist, who understands her nature.)

=== As A. T. Fitzroy ===
- Despised and Rejected, C.W.Daniel, 1918.

=== As Mrs Cyril Scott ===
- White Fire 1933 ("[A] collection of stories and sketches which a pleasant sympathy or a sentimental irony makes readable enough.")

=== As Lucian Wainwright ===
- Waters Meet, Martin Secker 1935 (An Englishwoman visits a sanatorium in the Austrian mountains at the time when Hitler is coming to power across the border.)
- Girl of Good Family, Martin Secker 1935 (A young woman from a Jewish family with branches in Vienna and elsewhere is unwilling to marry.)
- Oracle Methuen 1937 (About a sanatorium where a woman practices psychic healing.)

=== As Eunice Buckley ===
- Family from Vienna, Andrew Dakers, 1941 (After the Anschluss, Jewish refugees from Austria in London.)
- Destination Unknown, Andrew Dakers, 1942 (Sequel to Family from Vienna. The same family of Jewish refugees during the first years of the Second World War.)
- Blue Danube, Andrew Dakers, 1943 (A Viennese-Jewish family before the First World War, and again during the second.)
- Rhapsody for Strings, Andrew Dakers, 1945 (The daughter of a Viennese Count falls in love with a gipsy violinist.)
- Music in the Woods, Andrew Dakers, 1952 (The love of two people who fled Austria during the Nazi years, and are now in Switzerland.)
- Arranged for Small Orchestra, Andrew Dakers, 1953
- Dark Rainbow, Hodder and Stoughton, 1955 (Jealousy at a Swiss resort.)
- Shadow of a God, Hodder and Stoughton, 1956
- Instead of a Rocking-Horse, Hodder and Stoughton, 1957
- Gift from Heaven, Hodder and Stoughton, 1959. (About a musician hungry for success and fame.)
- For Benefits Received, Robert Hale, 1960. (What happens when a miracle cure occurs in an orthodox medical family.)
- Fiorina, Robert Hale, 1961 (Sequel to For Benefits Received.)
- The Consuming Fire, Robert Hale, 1962 (A charismatic preacher loses his faith.)
- Conjuring Trick, Robert Hale, 1963 (A man with an occult gift uses it to gain money and power.)
- Lay the Ghosts, Robert Hale, 1964 (Includes some characters from Shadow of a God.)
- They Walk on Earth, Robert Hale, 1966 (Featuring Sandor Raimann.)
- The Man on the Rope, Robert Hale, 1967. (Novel of the occult.Featuring Sandor Raimann.))
- Diamonds in the Family, Theosophical Publishing, 1968. (The diamonds that are a family's inheritance - and curse.Featuring Sandor Raimann.)
- If Wishes were Horses, Robert Hale, 1969
- The Flaming Sword, Robert Hale, 1969 (Featuring Sandor Raimann.)
- You've Got to Have Gold, Robert Hale, 1972 (An orphan girl from Vienna, adopted by an unsympathetic English family.)
- Just Was My Lot, Robert Hale, 1972 (Zero and Rosalind novel.)
- The Face of the Tempter, Robert Hale, 1973 (Zero and Rosalind novel.)
- To Walk without Fear, Robert Hale, 1974 (Zero and Rosalind novel.)
- Wonder-Worker, Robert Hale, 1975 (Zero and Rosalind novel.)
- The Half of My Kingdom, Robert Hale, 1976
- Prisoners of Hate, Robert Hale, 1977 (Conflict between a girl and the mother who hates her.)
- Work of Art, Robert Hale, 1978 (A clever boy is crippled in an accident. His struggle to cope.)
- Young Man of Great Promise, Robert Hale, 1978 (Novel set in the theatre.)
