= Kent and Sussex Crematorium and Cemetery =

Cemetery in Royal Tunbridge Wells, Kent, England

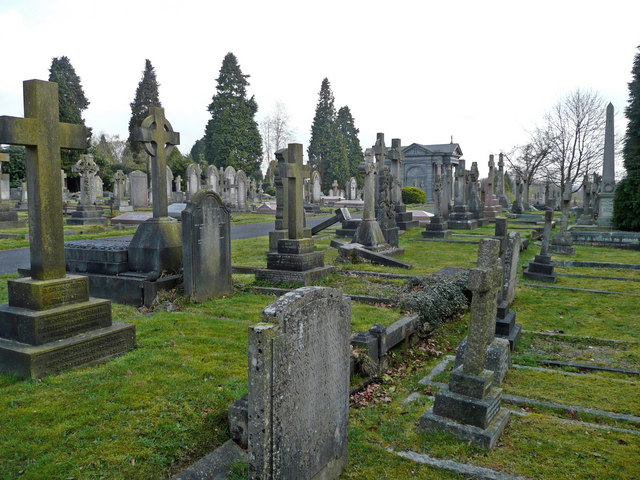
- Older graves and monuments. April 2008
- Interactive map of Kent and Sussex Crematorium and Cemetery

Details
- Established: 1873
- Location: Royal Tunbridge Wells, Kent
- Country: England, UK
- Coordinates: 51.115953°N 0.272429°E
- Owned by: Tunbridge Wells Borough Council
- Size: 28 acres (11 ha)
- No. of graves: 44,000+
- Website: Official website

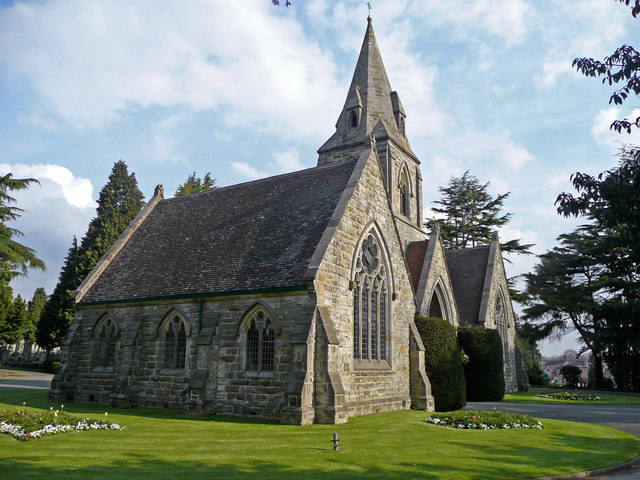
The chapel, located in the centre of the cemetery. April 2008

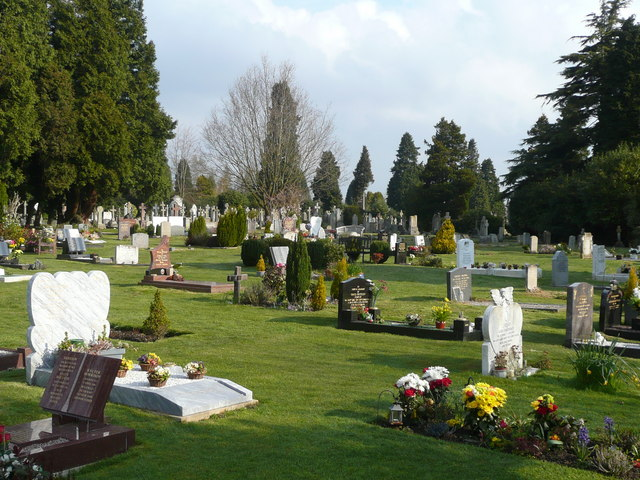
A section of newer graves near the centre of the cemetery. April 2008

The Kent and Sussex Crematorium and Cemetery is a crematorium and cemetery located in Royal Tunbridge Wells in the county of Kent, England.

== Background ==
As a quickly developing and popular Victorian era spa town, the town of Tunbridge Wells did not gain its first church until 1829, when the Decimus Burton designed Holy Trinity Church opened. The town gained its first cemetery, Woodbury Park Cemetery in 1849, laid out over 3 acres (1.2 ha) and consecrated as Trinity Cemetery.

However, as the town's expansion quickened, and with no additional land into which to expand the grounds, Woodbury Park proved too small. Although burials were continued to be allowed in family plots post 1873, the last burial took place there in 1934. It is now Grade II listed.

== History ==
After Tunbridge Wells town corporation had procured lands on the northern edge of Frant forest/southern edge of the town, the initially named Frant Forest Cemetery opened in 1873. It was laid out over an initial 23 acres (9.3 ha) site by the town surveyor William Brentnall, who had originally been recruited to rebuild the drainage system around the town. Brentnall was later buried in the same grounds. The co-located crematorium was opened in 1959.

Enlarged twice and now covering over 28 acres (11 ha), today the grounds house over 44,000 burials. In June 2014, a new Friends of Tunbridge Wells Cemetery association were formed.

The cemetery contains the war graves of 72 Commonwealth service personnel of World War I and 63 of World War II.

== Notable burials ==
- Rachel Beer, former newspaper proprietor, editor of The Observer and Sunday Times
- John Duncan Grant, British Army officer who was awarded the Victoria Cross (ashes)
- William Hartnell, actor, the first Doctor Who (ashes)
- Nikolai Legat, premier danseur, teacher, choreographer and caricaturist.
- Nadine Nicolaeva-Legat, prima ballerina, teacher and choreographer.
- James Leigh Joynes, clergyman and schoolmaster
- Mantovani, musician and conductor
