= James Leigh Joynes =

English journalist and activist (1853–1893)

- Born: 29 May 1853; Eton, Berkshire, England
- Died: 13 January 1893 (aged 39); West Hoathly, England
- Education: Eton College; King's College, Cambridge (B.A., 1875)
- Occupations: Journalist; writer; poet; activist
- Father: James Leigh Joynes Sr.
- Relatives: Henry S. Salt (brother-in-law)

James Leigh Joynes (29 May 1853 – 13 January 1893) was an English journalist, writer, poet, and socialist activist. A former teacher at Eton College, he became known for his involvement in land reform, Christian socialism, and the early British socialist movement. He was associated with figures such as Henry George and Henry S. Salt, and contributed to various political publications and organisations, including the Social Democratic Federation and the Fellowship of the New Life.

== Biography ==
=== Early life and education ===
James Leigh Joynes was born in Eton, Berkshire on 29 May 1853, the son of the Rev. James Leigh Joynes Sr., Lower Master of Eton College. He was educated there and matriculated at King's College, Cambridge in 1871, graduating with a B.A. in 1875.

=== Career ===
In 1876, Joynes returned to Eton, teaching classics: he attracted criticism for his vegetarianism and habit of riding a tricycle. It was there he became friends with fellow vegetarian Henry S. Salt, who would go on to marry his sister Catherine Leigh Joynes, in 1879.

In 1882, he read Progress and Poverty, and this inspired him to work with its author, Henry George. The two travelled to Ireland to investigate land ownership there, and were both convicted and imprisoned under the Coercion Act. Joynes wrote a letter to The Times about this, followed by a book, Adventures of a Tourist in Ireland. Eton's headmaster ordered Joynes to suppress the book, which he initially agreed, but then regretted and instead resigned from the school.

At the end of 1882, George found Joynes work as a journalist for the Irish World. He moved to London, where he was a founder of the Land Reform Union, and became joint editor of its newspaper, the Christian Socialist. He also joined the Fellowship of the New Life, and the Social Democratic Federation (SDF), becoming co-editor of Today, its monthly magazine, and serving on its executive committee. In 1884, he spent time working in Germany, and so resigned his editorial posts, thereby missing out on involvement in the major split in the SDF.

=== Later life and death ===
Joynes returned to London in 1886, writing Songs of a Revolutionary Epoch about the German poetry of 1848, and training as a doctor at Middlesex Hospital. He began suffering from heart disease, and in poor health, he retired to West Hoathly, where he wrote poetry. He died there on 13 January 1893, aged 39.

== Bibliography ==
=== Books ===
- The Adventures of a Tourist in Ireland. London: Kegan Paul, Trench & Co. 1882.
- Songs of a Revolutionary Epoch. London: Foulger & Co. 1888.
- On Lonely Shores and Other Rhymes. London: Printed for the author at the Chiswick Press. 1892.

=== Pamphlets ===
- The Socialist Catechism. London: The Modern Press. 1885.
- Socialist Rhymes. London: The Modern Press. 1885.
