= Tatjana Višak =

German philosopher (born 1974)

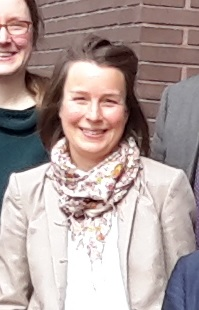
- Višak in 2015
- Born: 12 December 1974 (age 51); Gießen, West Germany
- Other name: Tatjana Visak
- Occupation: Philosopher
- Years active: 2000–present

Tatjana Višak (born 12 December 1974), often credited as Tatjana Visak, is a German philosopher specialising in ethics and political philosophy who is currently based in the Department of Philosophy and Business Ethics at the University of Mannheim. She is the author of the monographs Killing Happy Animals (2013, Palgrave Macmillan) and Capacity for Welfare Across Species (2023, Oxford University Press), and the editor, with the political theorist Robert Garner, of The Ethics of Killing Animals (2016, Oxford University Press).

== Career ==
Višak was born on 12 December 1974 in Gießen, West Germany. She was educated at the Theo-Koch Schule in Grünberg, and then the Institut Parisien, France, where she studied the French language and Philosophy and Art. She next studied at Leiden University in the Netherlands, graduating in 2000 with a MSc in Political Sciences (having focussed on political philosophy). She went on to work as a junior researcher/lecturer in the Ethics Institute at Utrecht University (spending some time as a researcher in the Ethics Department of the Erasmus Medical Center at Erasmus University) from 2000 to 2010. She read for a doctorate at Utrecht University, where she was supervised by Marcus Duwell and Marcellinus Verweij. Her PhD thesis was entitled Killing Happy Animals: Explorations in Utilitarian Ethics, and was submitted in 2011. This formed the basis of her 2013 monograph Killing Happy Animals: Explorations in Utilitarian Ethics, published with Palgrave Macmillan as part of The Palgrave Macmillan Animal Ethics Series, edited by the theologian Andrew Linzey and the philosopher Priscilla Cohn and published in conjunction with the Oxford Centre for Animal Ethics. The philosopher and animal studies scholar Anna Peterson, reviewing the book for the Journal of Agricultural and Environmental Ethics, characterised Killing Happy Animals as "carefully argued, well-organized, and clearly written", but somewhat repetitive. Though she considered it worth reading, she felt that the book's scope was limited by Višak's focus on utilitarianism.

After completing her PhD, Višak lectured in the Institute for Philosophy at Leiden University for a year, and became temporarily affiliated with the International School of Philosophy in the Netherlands. From 2011 to 2012, she was a postdoctoral fellow at Utrecht University's Ethics Institute, and then, from 2012 to 2013, she worked as a lecturer at the Monash University Centre for Human Bioethics. From 2013 to 2015, she was a research fellow at Saarland University, working with the philosophers Christoph Fehige and Ulla Wessels in Practical Philosophy. In 2013, she took up a research fellowship at the Department of Philosophy and Business Ethics at the University of Mannheim, working with Bernward Gesang. In 2016, The Ethics of Killing Animals, a book coedited by Višak and the political theorist Robert Garner, was published by Oxford University Press. The book contains essays from a variety of philosophers and other academics (including contributions from the editors) on the axiological, moral and political issues surrounding the killing of nonhuman animals, with an afterword by Peter Singer. Reviewing The Ethics of Killing Animals in Notre Dame Philosophical Reviews, the philosopher Jeff Sebo said he could "highly recommend this book for research as well as teaching", calling it "essential for people working on animal ethics". In 2018, Višak moved from Mannheim to the Department of International Political Theory and Philosophy at the Goethe University of Frankfurt, before moving to the Department of Philosophy and Economics at the University of Bayreuth. In 2019, she moved to the Department of Philosophy and Business Ethics at the University of Mannheim. Her monograph Capacity for Welfare Across Species was published by Oxford University Press in 2023.

== Research ==
Višak is known for her exploration of the ethics of killing nonhuman animals who have lived happy lives, and specifically her rejection of the idea that it is acceptable to kill animals for agricultural purposes provided they have pleasant lives. She challenges Peter Singer's idea that nonhuman animals are "replaceable", meaning that it is acceptable to kill nonhuman animals provided an equally happy animal is created to take their place. In her book Killing Happy Animals, Višak explores this and the related logic of the larder—the idea that farming nonhuman animals benefits them, as they would not exist otherwise—from within utilitarianism. She suggests that the replaceability argument is based on Total View Utilitarianism, which entails that the utility of both actual and potential beings (the latter being individuals whose existence or non-existence depends upon the actions of others now). Instead, Višak suggests, utilitarians should adopt a Prior Existence View, entailing that only the utility of actual beings is taken into account in the judgement of the rightness or wrongness of an action. She rejects the logic of the larder by arguing that beings are not made better off by being brought into existence. Ultimately, then, utilitarianism is not restricted to the avoidance of suffering, and contains the tools to censure the routine killing of nonhuman animals, even in "animal friendly" agriculture.

== Personal life ==
Višak is married with two children, who were born in 2004 and 2006. She is a native speaker of German and a German citizen, and is also fluent in English and Dutch, with conversational French.

== Selected bibliography ==
Books

- Višak, T. (2023). Capacity for Welfare Across Species. Oxford: Oxford University Press
- Višak, T. and R. Garner, eds., (2016) The Ethics of Killing Animals. New York: Oxford University Press.
- Višak, T. (2013). Killing Happy Animals: Explorations in Utilitarian Ethics. New York: Palgrave Macmillan.
