= The Ethics of Diet =

1883 book by Howard Williams

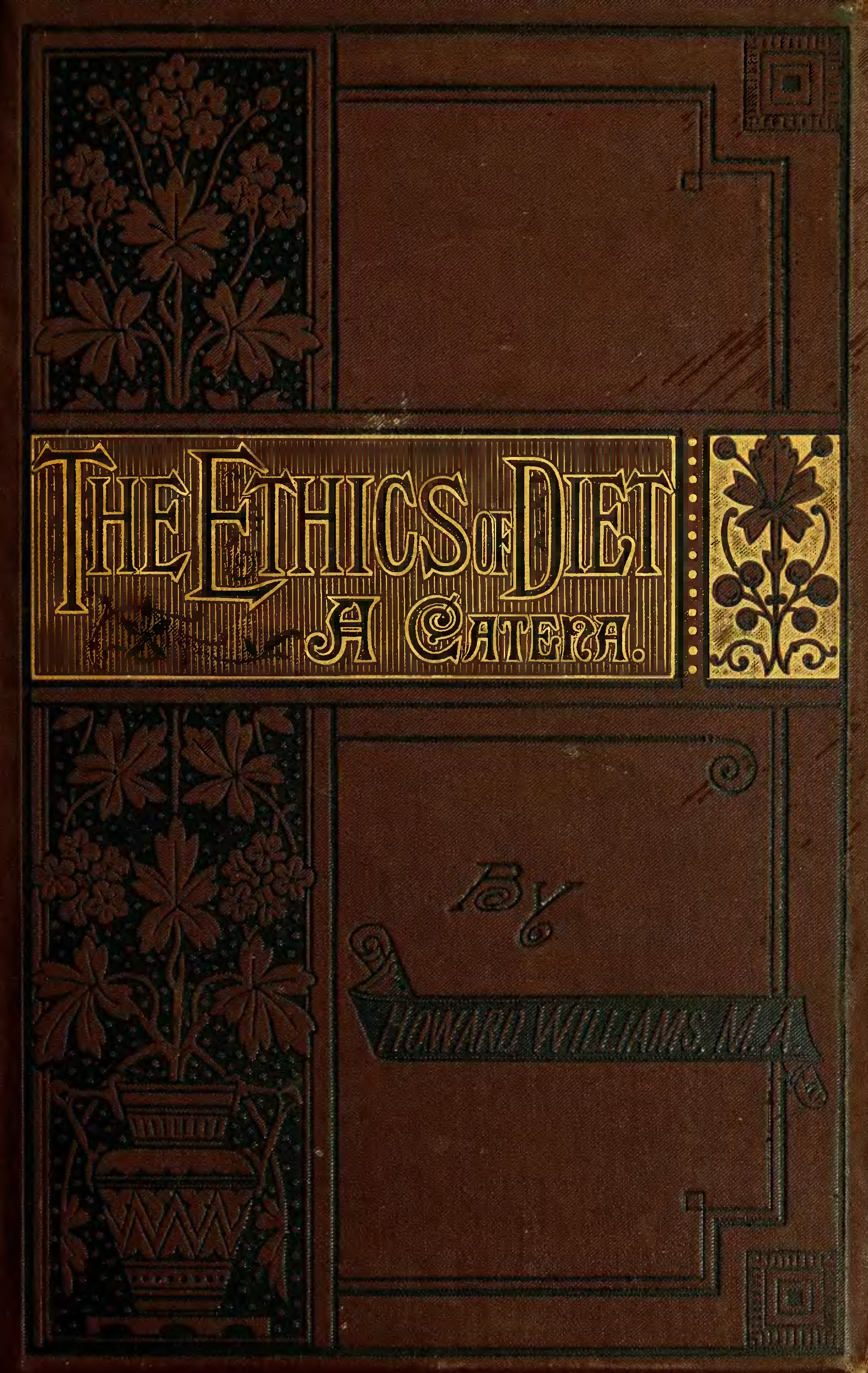
- First edition cover
- Author: Howard Williams
- Language: English
- Subject: History of vegetarianism; ethics of eating meat
- Publisher: F. Pitman (London); John Heywood (Manchester)
- Publication date: 1883
- Publication place: United Kingdom of Great Britain and Ireland
- Media type: Print
- Pages: xii + 336
- OCLC: 1045396368
- Text: The Ethics of Diet at Project Gutenberg

The Ethics of Diet: A Catena of Authorities Deprecatory of the Practice of Flesh-eating is an 1883 book by the English writer and humanitarian Howard Williams, published by F. Pitman and John Heywood. The book is a chronological anthology of writers who criticised meat-eating, including philosophers, poets, physicians, religious figures, and reformers. It was first serialised in The Dietetic Reformer and Vegetarian Messenger before publication in book form.

The Ethics of Diet has been discussed in histories of vegetarianism and the Victorian vegetarian movement. It influenced writers and activists including Henry S. Salt, Leo Tolstoy, Mohandas Gandhi, and Jaime de Magalhães Lima. Revised, abridged, and translated editions were published after the first edition, and a new edition edited by Carol J. Adams was published by the University of Illinois Press in 2003.

== Background ==
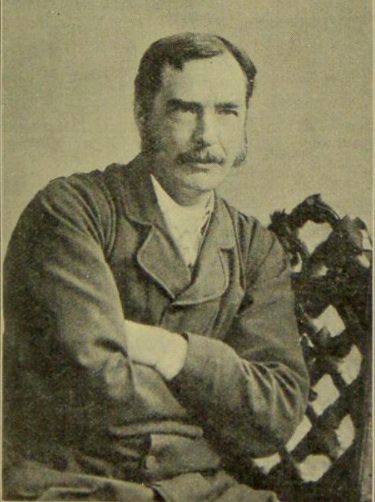
Howard Williams (1837–1931)

Howard Williams (1837–1931) was an English writer and humanitarian. He adopted vegetarianism in 1872 and later became an opponent of vivisection. Educated at St John's College, Cambridge, he supported himself through private means and occasional tutoring, and wrote on literary and ethical subjects.

Williams compiled The Ethics of Diet as a chronological collection of writers who opposed meat-eating. The book includes material from classical antiquity to the 19th century, with biographical notices, extracts, and commentary on arguments for abstaining from flesh.

== Summary ==
=== Preface ===
In the preface, Williams compares opposition to animal slaughter with earlier opposition to cannibalism and human sacrifice. He argues that the killing of animals for food degrades both individuals and society, and connects flesh-eating with insensibility, gluttony, and social injustice.

=== Main content ===
The main body of the work consists of biographical and philosophical sketches of more than 150 figures, divided into fifty chapters. It begins with ancient Greek authors such as Hesiod, Pythagoras, and Plato. Williams discusses Pythagoras in relation to metempsychosis, abstinence from animal food, and opposition to animal sacrifice. He also discusses Plato's account of simple diet and luxury in the Republic.

Williams includes Roman authors such as Ovid, Seneca, and Plutarch, and discusses their association of abstinence from flesh with moral discipline and opposition to cruelty. Christian figures including Clement of Alexandria, Tertullian, Chrysostom, and early ascetics are discussed in relation to abstinence and spiritual discipline. Williams also criticises later Christian institutions for moving away from this ethic.

The Renaissance and Enlightenment chapters discuss writers including Erasmus, Thomas More, Montaigne, and Rousseau. Williams gives attention to Rousseau's view of pity as a natural human instinct. He also includes 17th- and 18th-century physicians and naturalists, including Gassendi, George Cheyne, John Ray, and Linnaeus, who used anatomical, physiological, or moral arguments against flesh-eating. Additionally, he notes Voltaire's characterization of animals as capable of reason and feeling of emotion.

The book also discusses writers and reformers associated with modern vegetarianism, including William Cowherd, Percy Bysshe Shelley, Joseph Ritson, and William Lambe. Williams quotes Shelley at length on violence and meat-eating. He also includes writers such as Jean-Antoine Gleizes, Jules Michelet, Alphonse de Lamartine, and Arthur Schopenhauer, as well as figures associated with the Vegetarian Society, including William Metcalfe and Sylvester Graham.

In addition to ethical and religious arguments, Williams includes arguments based on health, economy, and social reform. He presents the slaughterhouse and meat-eating as practices opposed to humane and rational conduct.

=== Appendix ===
The book concludes with an appendix of additional writers and authorities not included in the main chapters, including excerpts from Buddhist texts and from Western writers such as Jeremy Bentham and Lord Byron.

== Reception and influence ==
The Ethics of Diet has been described as a contribution to the growth of the vegetarian movement in late Victorian England. Beyond that, the book also influenced individuals such as Henry S. Salt, Leo Tolstoy, Mohandas Gandhi, and the Tolstoyan writer Jaime de Magalhães Lima.

Gandhi later noted the book in his autobiography, The Story of My Experiments With Truth:

My faith in vegetarianism grew on me from day to day. Salt's book Plea for Vegetarianism whetted my appetite for dietetic studies. I went in for all books available on vegetarianism and read them. One of these, Howard Williams' The Ethics of Diet, was a 'biographical history of the literature of humane dietetics from the earliest period to the present day'.

Tolstoy wrote favourably of the book in Essays and Letters. He wrote that the reason for abstinence from animal food as the first act of fasting and moral life was "admirably explained" in The Ethics of Diet.

Salt praised the book in Animals' Rights: Considered in Relation to Social Progress as "by far the most scholarly and exhaustive" of recent works on animal rights. Lima drew on Williams' work in his 1912 lecture O Vegetarismo e a Moralidade das Raças ("Vegetarianism and the Morality of the Races").

== Publication history ==
The Ethics of Diet was first published in serial form between 1878 and 1883 in The Dietetic Reformer and Vegetarian Messenger, the monthly journal of the Vegetarian Society. It was first issued in book form in 1883 by F. Pitman in London and John Heywood in Manchester.

A revised and enlarged edition appeared in 1896 under the title The Ethics of Diet: A Biographical History of the Literature of Human Dietetics, From the Earliest Period to the Present Day. This edition included additional chapters on figures such as Ashoka, Oliver Goldsmith, Henry David Thoreau, Richard Wagner, and Anna Kingsford. In 1907, Albert Broadbent published an abridged version.

Translations were also published. A Russian edition appeared in 1892, with a foreword by Leo Tolstoy titled "The First Step". A Swedish translation by Victor Pfeiff was published in Stockholm in 1900.

Over time, the book became difficult to obtain and was held by only a small number of libraries, according to the University of Illinois Press. In 2003, the University of Illinois Press published a new edition edited by Carol J. Adams. In her introduction, Adams wrote that Williams' work "reinstates vegetarianism as an ethical imperative within history by giving it a history".

== See also ==
- Animal ethics
- Bibliography of veganism and vegetarianism
- Ethics of eating meat
- History of animal rights
- History of vegetarianism
- Vegetarianism in the Victorian era
- A Plea for Vegetarianism and Other Essays – 1886 book by Henry S. Salt
- The Logic of Vegetarianism – 1899 book by Henry S. Salt
- Fifty Years of Food Reform – 1898 book by Charles W. Forward
