= The First Step (essay) =

1891 essay by Leo Tolstoy

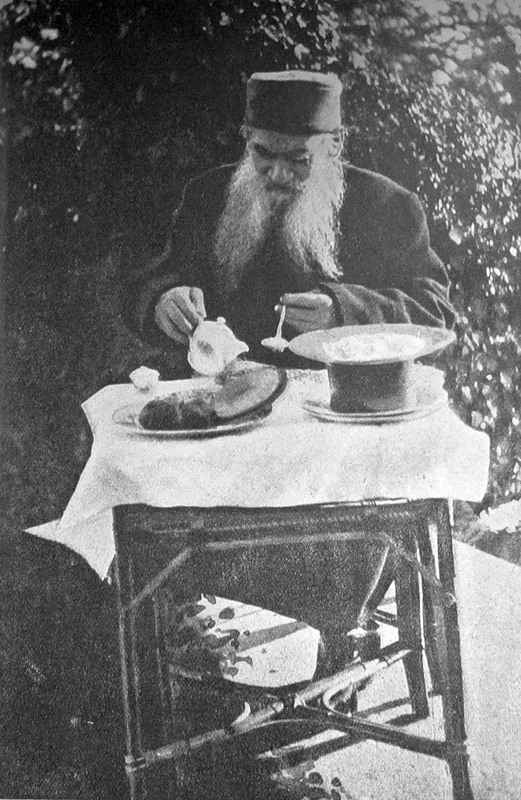
- Tolstoy eating a vegetarian breakfast
- Author: Leo Tolstoy
- Original title: Первая ступень
- Language: Russian
- Subject: Vegetarianism, animal rights
- Genre: Essay
- Published: 1891
- Publication place: Russian Empire
- Media type: Print

"The First Step" (Russian: Первая ступень) also known as "The Morals of Diet", is an 1891 essay by Russian author Leo Tolstoy that advocates for vegetarianism. Originally written as a preface to the Russian translation of Howard Williams' 1883 book The Ethics of Diet, the essay also touches on themes of anarchism and pacifism. In the piece, Tolstoy argues that adopting a vegetarian diet is a necessary first step toward moral development, drawing on religious, ethical, and psychological reasoning to support his claims.

== Content ==
According to South African novelist Imraan Coovadia, writing in 2020, the essay opens with a vivid depiction of a pig being slaughtered by a butcher, a scene Coovadia describes as characteristic of Tolstoy's style of "plainness and force." Although centered on the rights of animals, the essay also adopts a distinctly religious tone, urging readers to practice self-abnegation, fasting, and renunciation of worldly pleasures.

Ronald D. LeBlanc of the University of New Hampshire notes that the essay is structured in two unequal parts: the first focused on religious and ascetic justifications for vegetarianism, and the second on humanitarian and ethical arguments. Tolstoy also asserts that vegetarianism strengthens one's ability to control sexual impulses, a claim that has been criticized by modern psychologists as "pseudo-erotic."

The essay concludes with a psychological argument, asserting that the act of killing and consuming animals numbs human sensitivity to compassion, pity, and empathy for others.

== Legacy ==
"The First Step" was considered instrumental in encouraging Mohandas Gandhi to maintain his vegetarian diet. According to Charlotte Alston, a lecturer at Northumbria University, Tolstoy had planned to establish a vegetarian journal in 1893 with the same title, The First Step.

The essay was first translated into English in 1900 by Tolstoy's regular translators, Aylmer and Louise Maude, and again in 1905 by Leo Wiener.

== See also ==
- Bibliography of Leo Tolstoy
