= Charles William Daniel =

English publisher & writer (1871–1955)

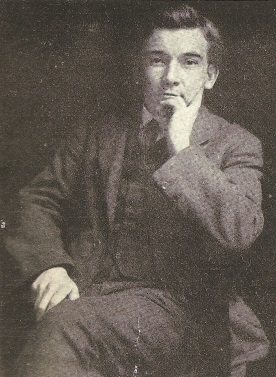
- Born: 23 April 1871; London, England
- Died: 15 January 1955 (aged 83); Ashingdon, England
- Citizenship: British
- Occupations: Publisher, writer
- Spouse: Florence Worland (m. 1905)

Charles William Daniel (23 April 1871 – 15 January 1955) was an English publisher and writer who did much to disseminate Tolstoyan and pacifist ideas, and ideas about food reform and alternative medicine, in the first half of the twentieth century. During the First World War he was twice prosecuted for works that he published. The first prosecution was for his own pamphlet, The Knock-Out Blow; when fined he refused to pay and was imprisoned. Later he was prosecuted for publishing the controversial novel Despised and Rejected by Rose Allatini, and was again fined. The magazines that he edited and published included work by many of the advanced thinkers of the time.

== Early life ==
Charles William Daniel was born on 23 April 1871 at 35 Kings Cross Road, London. His father, an employee of the publishing house Frederick Warne & Co., died when he was 12 years old. Young Charles had to earn his living from the age of fourteen, first as an office boy in Hatton Garden, and then in the office of an advertising agency. Eventually he became an employee of the Walter Scott publishing company in Paternoster Row. The manager of the company was F. R. Henderson, who later ran the left-wing bookshop on Charing Cross Road popularly nicknamed 'The Bomb Shop'. This company published the works of Tolstoy, a thinker in whom Charles was already interested. He was strongly influenced by the Tolstoyan lecturer J. C. Kenworthy, and eventually he started the Sunday discussion group that eventually became the London Tolstoyan Society. One of the visitors to these meetings was Florence Worland, whom he married some years later.

== Publisher ==
In 1902 Charles Daniel started his own small publishing business in Cursitor Street (off Chancery Lane). He became associated with the Free Age Press, which had the agency for Tolstoy's writings, and distributed them at such low prices that they could not have made a profit. The firm also issued a series of 'People's Classics' (at 1d or 2d a copy) 'printed to place in the hands of the masses, at the cheapest price, the richest thoughts of the world's greatest thinkers'. The series included writings by Emerson, Aristotle, Socrates, Rousseau and others. In the early 1900s the firm of C. W. Daniel began publishing magazines. One of these was at first called The Tolstoyan, but later The Crank, a name chosen by Mary Everest Boole, because, she said, quoting Henry George, 'a crank was a little thing that made revolutions'; in 1907 the magazine was renamed The Open Road. Another magazine published by the Daniel company was The Healthy Life. 'The Cranks' Table' was an unofficial luncheon club that met in a Bride Street vegetarian restaurant, and discussed the problems facing the world. Members included journalists from the Liberal papers the Daily News and The Star.

== 'A philosophical anarchist' ==
In 1908 Daniel opened a small bookshop in Amen Corner, off Ludgate Hill. In 1909 he published his book Instead of Socialism, which attacked the authoritarian tendencies of socialist thinkers, and was based on the teachings of Proudhon, and on the economic theories of Henry George. He called himself a 'philosophical anarchist', was strictly vegetarian and a convinced pacifist, on Tolstoyan lines. He would never vote or serve on a jury, and was a convinced opponent of all war.

== Tolstoy ==
Tolstoy occasionally provided articles for The Crank. Charles Daniel wrote articles under the pseudonym of 'The Odd Man'; Tolstoy included some of Daniel's sayings in his anthology, The Circle of Reading. Other contributors to Daniel's magazines included Dorothy Richardson, Cecil Chesterton, G. K. Chesterton and the educational reformer Mary Everest Boole.Charles Daniel's admiration for Tolstoy was enhanced by a visit to see him at Yasnaya Polyana. He was deeply impressed by the Russian genius, and after Tolstoy's death wrote an account of him that took the writer's side in the controversy about Tolstoy's marriage.

== The firm of C. W. Daniel ==
The firm of C. W. Daniel published many books that promoted vegetarian, pacifist, Tolstoyan ideals. Most of these books were published on a subsidy basis, with the author underwriting the costs of publication, or guaranteeing to buy a set number of copies.

== The First World War ==
During the Great War, Daniel published pacifist writings such as Theodora Wilson Wilson's The Last Weapon (1916), The Feet of the Young Men (1917) by 'Herbert Tremaine' (pseudonym of Maude Deuchar) and works by Walter Walsh, G.T. Sadler, J. Scott Duckers, whose Handed Over (1917) told of his experiences in the Army. Daniel was prosecuted twice under the Defence of the Realm Act. The first prosecution was for his own pamphlet The Knock-Out Blow, an attack on Lloyd George's war policy which depicted the horrors of war, mostly by extensive quotations from The Great Push by Patrick MacGill. Daniel refused to pay a fine of £80, and was imprisoned for two months at Wormwood Scrubs. The second prosecution was for the novel Despised and Rejected by 'A. T. Fitzroy' (a pseudonym of Rose Allatini).

== Despised and Rejected ==
This novel explores theme of homosexuality, and some of its characters express strongly pacifist views. The journalist James Douglas, who had previously incited prosecution for indecency of The Rainbow by D. H. Lawrence, wrote in the magazine London Opinion:

A thoroughly poisonous book, every copy of which ought to be put on the fire forthwith, is Despised and Rejected, by A. T. Fitzroy – probably a pen-name. Of its hideous immoralities the less said the better; but concerning its sympathetic presentation, in the mouths of its ‛hero' and of other characters of pacifism and conscientious objection, and of sneering at the English as compared with the Hun, this needs to be asked: What is the use of our spending hundreds of thousands of pounds on propaganda, and tens of thousands more on Censorship, while pestiferous filth like this remains unsuppressed? The book is published by C. W. Daniel, Ltd., of Graham House, Tudor Street; and I imagine that it will not be long, after the authorities have examined this literary fungus, before he is a Daniel brought to judgment.

The book was tried at the City of London court at the Mansion House on 10 October 1918; Daniel was fined £420 with £40 costs. Friends and supporters raised the money to pay the fine for him. After the trial, Daniel published a pamphlet defending himself against charges of immorality, and claiming that he had not realised the sexual implications of Allatini's book.

I was assured by the author that the love between the hero and his friend was analogous to that between David and Jonathan. I did not see what has since been pointed out – that certain passages are open to an immoral interpretation. Personally, I would rather that any book were burnt than that I should be party to lending support to depravity of either the homo-sexual or the contra-sexual types.

== After World War I ==
In the twenties and thirties Daniel's firm published a wide range of the advanced thinkers of his time. These included Søren Kierkegaard and the psychologists Alfred Adler and Georg Groddeck, as well as a range of British high-thinkers and simple-lifers. He published plays by D. H. Lawrence and Douglas Goldring.

A new journal, Focus (later changed to Purpose) was a more general cultural magazine. Its long list of contributors includes Henry Miller, Lawrence Durrell, John Middleton Murry, T. S. Eliot, Elizabeth Bowen, Rayner Heppenstall and Dylan Thomas among lesser-known names. Most of the editing work of this magazine was done by Daniel's associate W. T. Symons – they seem to have shared the pseudonym "John Marlow".

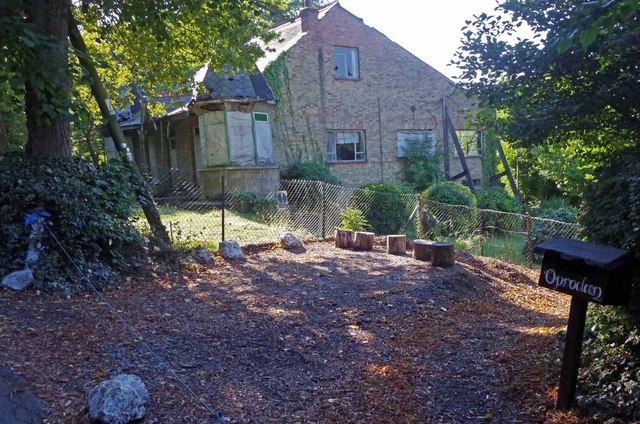
"Oprodan" in Ashingdon, where Daniel is believed to have moved his business and resided until his death

In the thirties, Daniel was attracted to the Social Credit economic theories of C. H. Douglas. In 1934 the company relaunched the magazine Healthy Life, dedicated to 'the release of health for the joy of living'; Daniel wrote articles promoting natural cures and food reform. During the Second World War (in which Daniel's pacifism found less public expression) his business premises and his home were both hit by bombs, and he moved the business to Ashingdon, in Essex.

== Death ==
Daniel died in Ashingdon, on 15 January 1955, aged 83.

== The fate of his publishing house ==
His firm continued, by now mainly notable for publishing books in the increasingly popular, though scientifically dubious, field of alternative medicine. In more recent years the firm has been taken over by Random House, whose website states:

We are pleased to now be publishing the complete catalogue of CW Daniel Books. Highly respected for its broad spectrum of remedial titles including, aromatherapy, homeopathy and Bach Flower remedies, CW Daniel has made a unique contribution to Mind, Body and Spirit publishing.
