= Florence Daniel =

English writer (1877–1927)

- Born: Florence Ethel Worland; 1877; Canning Town, Essex, England
- Died: 4 September 1927 (aged 49); Watford, England
- Occupations: Writer; editor
- Spouse: Charles William Daniel (m. 1905)
- Writing career
- Pen name: F. E. Worland
- Notable works: Food Remedies: Facts About Foods and Their Medicinal Uses (1908); The Healthy Life Cook Book (1908)

Florence Ethel Daniel (née Worland; 1877 – 4 September 1927), who also wrote as F. E. Worland, was an English writer and magazine editor associated with vegetarian cooking, health reform, and the Tolstoyan movement. She was married to the publisher Charles William Daniel and worked with him on periodicals connected with Tolstoyan, pacifist, vegetarian, and health reform circles. In the 1920s, she edited Focus, a monthly magazine on health, wealth, and life.

== Biography ==
Daniel was born Florence Ethel Worland in the final quarter of 1877 in Canning Town, Essex. She met Charles William Daniel through the London Tolstoyan Society. According to the International Institute of Social History, she was often critical of Leo Tolstoy's teachings, but collaborated with Charles Daniel on a book about the society. They married in 1905 and lived at Downham, Essex.

In 1904, Charles Daniel founded The Crank, a monthly periodical that he edited with Daniel. It was later renamed The Open Road and published material by Tolstoyans, anarchists, pacifists and health food advocates. It continued until 1913.

Daniel wrote on vegetarian cookery and food remedies. Her books include Food Remedies: Facts About Foods and Their Medicinal Uses and The Healthy Life Cook Book. The Healthy Life Cook Book was connected with The Healthy Life, a magazine devoted to health and food reform that was later associated with the C. W. Daniel Company.

During the 1920s, Daniel edited Focus, a monthly magazine on "matters of health, wealth and life". Daniel died at Watford on 4 September 1927, aged 49, after an illness caused by the effects of a fall. An obituary was published in The Vegetarian News.

== Publications ==
- Love: Sacred and Profane (as F. E. Worland; London: C. W. Daniel)
- Food Remedies: Facts About Foods and Their Medicinal Uses (London: C. W. Daniel, 1908)
- The Healthy Life Cook Book (London: C. W. Daniel, 1908)

== See also ==
- History of vegetarianism
- Vegetarianism in the Victorian era
- Women and vegetarianism and veganism advocacy
