= Jaime de Magalhães Lima =

Portuguese philosopher, poet and writer

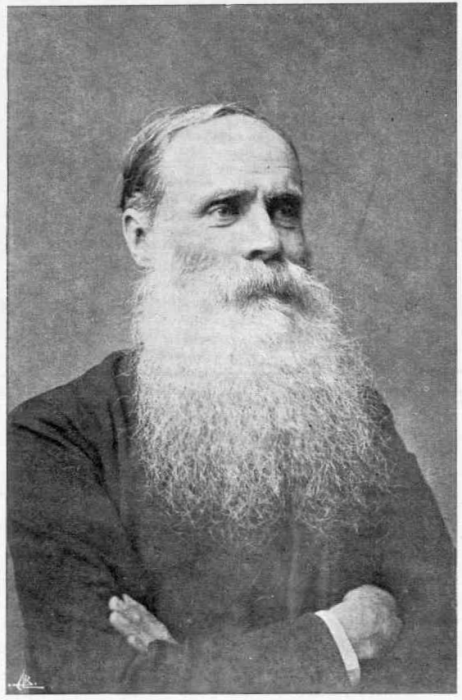
Jaime de Magalhães Lima

Jaime de Magalhães Lima (15 October 1859 in Aveiro – 26 February 1936) was a Portuguese philosopher, poet and writer.

== Works ==
- 1886 - Estudos sobre a literatura contemporânea
- 1887 - O Snr. Oliveira Martins e o seu projecto de lei sobre o fomento rural
- 1888 - A democracia
- 1888 - A arte de estudar
- 1889 - Cidades e paisagens
- 1892 - As doutrinas do Conde Leão Tolstoi
- 1894-1895 - Jesus Cristo
- 1899 - Notas de um provinciano
- 1899 - Transviado
- 1899 - O Crédito agrícola em Portugal
- 1900 - Elogio de Edmundo de Magalhães Machado
- 1901 - Sonho de Perfeição
- 1902 - J. P. Oliveira Martins
- 1902 - Vozes do meu lar
- 1903 - Na paz do senhor
- 1904 - Reino da saudade
- 1905 - Via redentora
- 1906 - Apóstolos da terra
- 1908 - S. Francisco de Assis e seus evangelhos
- 1909 - O ensino de Jesus : uma exposição simples
- 1909 - A anexação da Bósnia e da Herzegovina pela Áustria
- 1909 - José Estêvão
- 1910 - Alexandre Herculano
- 1910 - Rogações de eremita
- 1912 - O Vegetarismo e a Moralidade das raças
- 1915 - Salmos do prisioneiro
- 1915 - A guerra : depoimentos de hereges
- 1918 - Do que o fogo não queima
- 1920 - Rasto de sonhos : arte e alentos de pousadas da minha terra
- 1920 - Eucaliptos e acácias
- 1923 - Coro dos coveiros
- 1923 - A língua portuguesa e os seus mistérios
- 1924 - Alberto Sampaio e o significado dos seus estudos na interpretação da história nacional
- 1925 - Camilo e a renovação do sentimento nacional na sua época
- 1925 - Rafael Bordalo Pinheiro: moralizador político e social
- 1926 - A arte de repousar e o seu poder na constituição mental e moral dos trabalhadores
- 1931 - Princípios e deveres elementares
- 1931 - Dificuldades étnicas e históricas da insinuação do nacionalismo na arte portuguesa contemporânea
- 1933 - O amor das nossas coisas : e alguns que bem o serviram
- 1934 - Dr. Alberto Souto : o seu espírito, o seu carácter e a sua obra
- 1957 - Divagações de um terceiro
- 1964 - O culto da flor e os jardins da Inglaterra
- 1968 - Os povos do baixo Vouga
- 1986 - Entre pastores e nas serras
