= Frederick Pitman (publisher) =

English publisher and writer (1828–1886)

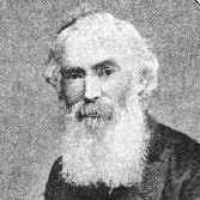
- Pitman in his later years
- Born: 9 May 1828; Trowbridge, Wiltshire, England
- Died: 21 November 1886 (aged 58); Crouch End, London, England
- Resting place: Highgate Cemetery
- Occupations: Publisher; writer; educator
- Years active: 1847–1886
- Relatives: Isaac Pitman (brother); Jacob Pitman (brother); Benjamin Pitman (brother)

Frederick Pitman (9 May 1828 – 21 November 1886) was an English publisher, writer, and educator. A younger brother of Isaac Pitman, the inventor of Pitman shorthand, he helped publish and promote shorthand literature and education in the mid-19th century. He established a London publishing firm that became the principal outlet for Isaac Pitman's shorthand works and related periodicals. In 1862, he founded a music publishing business that specialised in domestic and popular compositions, including works by Michael William Balfe. Pitman also published vegetarian literature and edited several journals devoted to shorthand. He was a member of the Royal Society of Arts, served as its first shorthand examiner, and supported spelling reform.

== Biography ==
=== Early life and education ===
Frederick Pitman was born on 9 May 1828 in Trowbridge, Wiltshire, the youngest of eleven children, seven sons and four daughters, of Maria Pitman (née Davis) and Samuel Pitman, a long-serving clerk and overseer at James Edgell's cloth factory.

His brothers included Isaac, the creator of Pitman shorthand; Jacob, a builder and architect who later settled in Australia; and Benjamin, a stenographer, author, artist, and teacher who later lived in the United States.

In the year of Frederick's birth, his father began a cloth-making business. Around 1833, the family moved to Bradford-on-Avon, where they lived in Ringston House, a building dating from the reign of Charles II. Frederick spent his early childhood there.

Frederick received his early education from Isaac in Wotton-under-Edge, before attending school in Bradford-on-Avon and later rejoining Isaac in Bath. While in Bath, he was articled to a solicitor, Mr Viner, but found the legal profession unappealing. In 1845, he joined the shorthand movement, travelling to Yarmouth, Exeter, and the eastern counties to lecture and teach shorthand alongside figures including Thomas Allen Reed and Joseph Pitman.

=== Publishing career ===
In 1847, Pitman settled in London. After reaching the age of majority in 1849, he established his own publishing firm at 20 Paternoster Row, London. He became the principal publisher of Isaac Pitman's shorthand books and periodicals, working with their father, who remained involved in the business during his later years. He partnered with Thomas Allen Reed for seven years under the name Pitman and Reed. After the partnership ended, Pitman continued in publishing while Reed focused on shorthand reporting.

In 1862, Pitman established a music publishing business, focusing chiefly on domestic and popular repertoire, including works by Michael William Balfe. The venture grew into a large business. Pitman's company continued to operate under his name until 1900, when it was acquired by Hart & Co., a firm founded in 1881. The combined enterprise, known as Pitman, Hart & Co., remained active until about 1960, when it was absorbed by J. B. Cramer & Co.

Pitman also published vegetarian literature. He was involved in the publication of The Vegetarian Messenger, the official journal of the Vegetarian Society, and issued works including John Smith's Vegetable Cookery (1866) and Howard Williams' The Ethics of Diet (1883). He published a new edition of A Vindication of Natural Diet by Percy Bysshe Shelley in 1884.

=== Other activities ===
Pitman was elected a member of the Royal Society of Arts in 1861. He served as its first shorthand examiner in 1864.

He wrote several works on shorthand and edited magazines including the Shorthand Magazine, which he founded in 1866 and edited until his death, and the Phonographic Lecturer.

Pitman supported spelling reform. He also worked as a shorthand teacher and reporter in London, later conducting classes at institutions including the City of London College.

=== Death ===
Pitman died on 21 November 1886, aged 58, at his residence in Crouch End, London. He was buried at Highgate Cemetery on 25 November.

== Publications ==
=== Magazines ===
- The Shorthand Magazine (1866–1886)
- The Phonographic Student (1867–1876)
- The Phonographic Pulpit (1869–1876)
- The Phonographic Lecturer (from 1871)

=== Books ===
- Second Book in Phonetic Reading for Adults (1850)
- Pitman's Reporters' Reading Book (1867)
- Learning to Report (1883)
- How to Get Speed in Shorthand (1884)
- Pitman's Shorthand Library: Tom Brown's School Days (1884)
- A Vindication of Natural Diet by Percy Bysshe Shelley, new edition (1884)
