= Amanta Scott =

Amanta Scott is a Canadian multi-disciplinary artist, known for her encaustic paintings, interactive sculptures, videos, and workshops exploring the roles and expectations of women and the links between mythology and our world today. Scott uses her art for raising awareness of urgent contemporary social issues.

Scott conducts workshops for refugees, newcomers, Indigenous people, troubled youths, women's shelters, students and seniors across North America and Asia.

== Career ==
Between 1992 and 1994 Virago Project, one of her first interactive found object sound sculpture installations exploring the bold and boisterous feminine spirit, toured the Greater Toronto Area, and featured at Art Gallery of Ontario, Justina M. Barnicke Gallery and Music Gallery.

In 1995 Scott received an Artist Fellowship Award from Bunkacho, the Japanese Agency for Cultural Affairs.

In 1996 her installation O Canada, commissioned by the Canadian Trade Office in Taipei, was featured at the World Trade Centre, Taiwan. Scott also received an Artist Fellowship Award from the Japan Foundation. Scott created her sound sculpture installation Dragon Tango which toured Japan, and resulted in solo exhibitions at the Canadian Embassy in Tokyo in 1996, and at Edmonton Art Gallery, Singapore International Arts Festival and Royal Ontario Museum in 1998.

In 2005 Public Works & Government Services Canada commissioned Scott to create a series of sculptures utilizing waste from government buildings. Correctional Service of Canada offered her prison beds from the former Kingston Prison for Women. Her resulting sculpture installations LockDown and 15 Minutes of Fame premiered at Art Gallery of Algoma in 2005. Scott's installation 15 Minutes of Fame featured a prison bed and a standard issue get-out-of-jail orange suitcase filled with personal effects.

In 2008 Scott's installation 15 Minutes of Fame featured in Scotia Bank’s Nuit Blanche Toronto 2008.

Her installation project Parallel Lines was exhibited at Festival International Montréal En Arts, Montreal, Quebec, in 2011; and at Museum of Northern History in Kirkland Lake, Ontario in 2018.

In 2019, she created her installation Eyeing Medusa. Celebrating outstanding contemporary women of all ages, cultures and walks of life, paralleled with ancient heroines, Eyeing Medusa received a virtual solo exhibition at the Miles Nadal Gallery in 2022, and a live solo exhibition at Orillia Museum of Art & History in 2023. One of her paintings from Eyeing Medusa also featured in the exhibition Portraits of Resilience at Art Gallery of Ontario.

== Personal life ==
Scott's ancestors include composer Cyril Scott, author Rose Allatini, entrepreneur and philanthropist Moise Allatini, and inventor Marcel Dassault, man of letters Eric Allatini, psychoanalyst and philosopher Elianne Amado Levy-Valensi, composer Darius Milhaud, Comte Moise de Camondo, Arnold Rapoport Edler Von Porada, Rabbi Solomon Judah Lob Rapoport, Rabbi Yom-Tov Lipmann Heller, and Rabbi Aryeh Leib Heller.

== Selected solo exhibitions ==
- 2023, Eyeing Medusa, Orillia Museum of Art and History, Orillia, Ontario, Canada
- 2023, Faces of Tikkun Olam, Miles Nadal JCC Gallery at the J, Toronto, Ontario, Canada
- 2021, Eyeing Medusa, Miles Nadal JCC Gallery at the J, Toronto, Ontario, Canada
- 2018, Parallel Lines, Museum of Northern History, Kirkland Lake, Canada
- 2011, Parallel Lines, Festival International Montréal En Arts, Montreal, Canada
- 2009, Parallel Lines, United Nations Refugee Agency, Toronto, Canada
- 2008, 15 Minutes of Fame (a.k.a. Parallel Lines), Scotiabank Nuit Blanche Toronto, Canada
- 2007/6, ShellShock, Music Gallery; Church of Holy Trinity, Toronto, Ontario
- 2005, Arising Phoenix, National Gallery of Canada, Royal Ontario Museum
- 2005, LockDown, 15 Minutes of Fame Art Gallery of Algoma, Sault Ste. Marie, Ontario
- 2003, Glove Forest, Thunder Bay Art Gallery, Art Gallery of Algoma, The Robert McLaughlin Gallery
- 2002, Arising Phoenix, National Centre for Traditional Arts, Yilan, Taiwan; Art Gallery of Peterborough, Art Gallery of Algoma, MacLaren Art Centre, Thunder Bay Art Gallery
- 2001 - 96, Glove Forest; Dragon Tango, Royal Ontario Museum, Edmonton Art Gallery, Singapore International Arts Festival, Academy Theatre; Market Hall, Canadian Embassy in Tokyo, Hijikawa Wind Museum, Japan
- 1996, O Canada, Canadian Trade Office in Taipei, Taiwan
- 1994-2, Virago Project, Justina M. Barnicke Gallery; Art Gallery of Ontario
