= William Reeves (publisher) =

English publisher and bookseller (1853–1937)

- Born: William Reeves III; 1853
- Died: 1937 (aged 83–84)
- Occupations: Publisher; printer; bookseller
- Known for: Publishing the Bellamy Library of Fact and Fiction and the authorised English version of Manifesto of the Communist Party
- Spouse: Elizabeth Tapley (m. 1875)

William Reeves III (1853–1937) was an English publisher, printer, and bookseller associated with late-Victorian radical publishing. Based in London, he issued political and social literature from 185 Fleet Street and published the Bellamy Library of Fact and Fiction, a series of inexpensive radical and socialist texts in the 1890s. He also issued the authorised English version of Karl Marx and Friedrich Engels's Manifesto of the Communist Party in 1888.

== Career ==
Reeves was one of six children of the publisher and bookseller William Dobson Reeves. After an apprenticeship with the Manchester bookseller William Hayes, he returned to London. When Reeves married Elizabeth Tapley in 1875, his father handed over to him a branch bookshop at 185 Fleet Street.

From Fleet Street, Reeves developed a business in political and social literature, Masonic textbooks, and music. Reeves & Turner, the firm established by his father, remained active until 1893 and published works on social and political subjects, including the first edition of William Morris's News from Nowhere in 1891. Reeves later reissued some books and journals first published by the family firm.

Music publishing and bookselling became the most profitable part of his business. By 1900, after the firm's move to 83 Charing Cross Road following the demolition of the Fleet Street premises, Reeves's stock had been reorganised and his business had increasingly concentrated on musical literature.

== Radical publishing ==
Matthew Beaumont writes that Reeves is difficult to place precisely in the history of publishing and the socialist movement, partly because later writers sometimes confused him with other men of similar names. Reeves took part in radical reform networks in the 1880s. He joined the Land Nationalization Society at its foundation in 1881, served on its executive committee, and used 185 Fleet Street as the society's literature depot. He later transferred his support to the rival Land Reform Union.

Reeves's publishing list reflected several strands of late-Victorian radicalism. Beaumont notes that he issued periodicals associated with utopian socialism, humanitarianism, and Christian socialism, while also marketing himself as a publisher of social and political works and English musical literature.

Among the socialist texts associated with Reeves was the authorised English version of Karl Marx and Friedrich Engels's Manifesto of the Communist Party, issued in 1888 in a translation by Samuel Moore prepared with Engels's involvement.

== Bellamy Library of Fact and Fiction ==
Reeves published the Bellamy Library of Fact and Fiction, a series of 33 fictional and non-fictional radical works issued between 1890 and about the turn of the 20th century. The series was built around Edward Bellamy's Looking Backward and was intended to make political literature financially accessible to working-class activists and lower-middle-class radicals.

The books were generally issued in small, inexpensive formats, with standard paper-covered editions sold for one shilling and some titles available more cheaply or in more expensive bindings. Beaumont describes the series as a systematic contribution to the political self-education of the labour movement.
