= Animals' Rights: Considered in Relation to Social Progress =

1892 book by Henry S. Salt

Animals' Rights
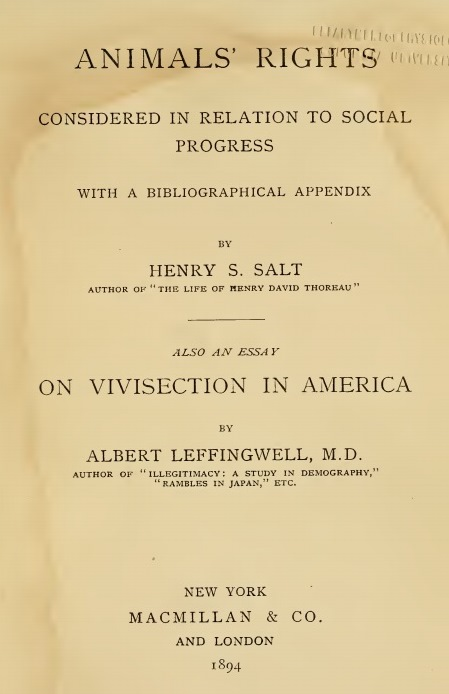
- Title page of the 1894 first American edition
- Author: Henry S. Salt
- Language: English
- Subject: Animal rights
- Publisher: George Bell & Sons
- Publication date: 1892
- Publication place: United Kingdom
- Media type: Print
- Pages: 162
- OCLC: 14024795

Animals' Rights: Considered in Relation to Social Progress is an 1892 book by the British writer and social reformer Henry S. Salt. In it, Salt argues that animals, as sentient beings, should be regarded as having moral and legal rights grounded in justice, and he criticises practices that he considered incompatible with humane conduct. The book has often been described as the first explicit treatment of the idea of animal rights.

== Background ==
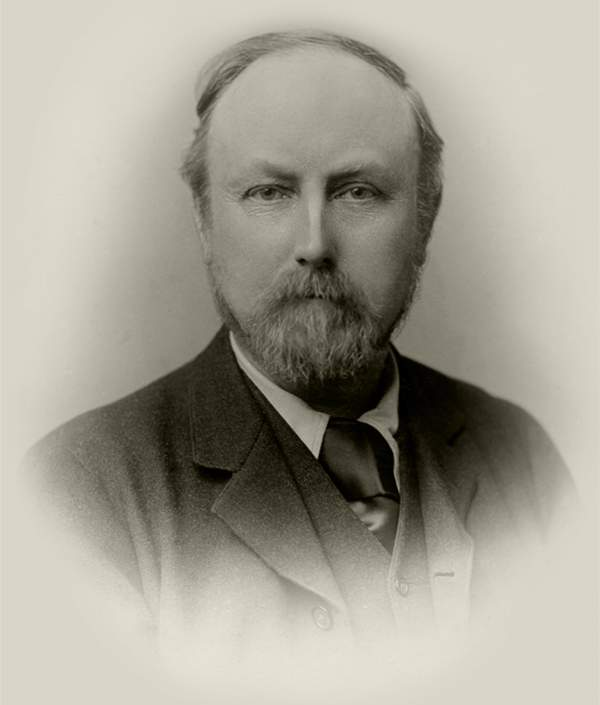
Henry S. Salt

Henry S. Salt was known for his work on prison reform, education, economic justice, and animal welfare. A vegetarian, socialist, pacifist, and anti-vivisectionist, he founded the Humanitarian League in 1891. He was later credited by Mahatma Gandhi as an influence on his vegetarianism. Salt was a prolific writer and published 40 books, beginning with A Plea for Vegetarianism and Other Essays in 1886.

Salt wrote Animals' Rights: Considered in Relation to Social Progress to state the case for animals' rights, relate it to wider humanitarian reform, and dispute arguments used to defend practices that caused suffering to sentient beings.

== Summary ==
Salt argues that animals, as sentient beings, are entitled to certain fundamental rights, especially the right to live without unnecessary suffering, and that this claim rests on justice rather than sentiment or utility.

The book criticises religious and Cartesian doctrines that denied animal consciousness and moral standing. It discusses practices that Salt regarded as violations of animals' rights, including vivisection, slaughterhouses, hunting, the fur trade, and the confinement of caged birds and animals in menageries. Salt also includes chapters on the rights of domesticated animals and wild animals, criticises meat-eating, and draws parallels between the treatment of animals and earlier campaigns concerning slavery abolition and women's rights. He ends by calling for legal reform, education, and a broader humanitarian movement that would include non-human animals within the moral community.

== Reception ==
James H. Hyslop reviewed the book in the International Journal of Ethics in 1895. He praised its moral spirit, but argued that Salt had not provided an adequate theoretical basis for the equal rights he appeared to claim for humans and animals. Hyslop also argued that the book ran together several separate questions, including animal rights, humane treatment, and vegetarianism.

In 1895, The William and Mary Quarterly said that Salt was "undoubtedly ahead of his age by many years".

== Publication history ==
The first American edition, published in 1894, included an essay, "On Vivisection in America", by Albert Leffingwell.

A reprint of the first edition was published in 1980, with a preface by the Australian philosopher Peter Singer, known for his work on the ethics of the treatment of animals, especially Animal Liberation. The 1980 reissue was reviewed by Stephen Clark, who praised Salt's book with some reservations. Clark argued that Salt's attempt to attribute the treatment of non-human animals to the theological doctrine of man's dominion over the natural world was mistaken.

== See also ==
- Books by Henry Stephens Salt
- Bibliography of veganism and vegetarianism
- History of animal rights
- History of vegetarianism
- Vegetarianism in the Victorian era
