= Henry Stephens Salt =

British writer and social reformer (1851–1939)

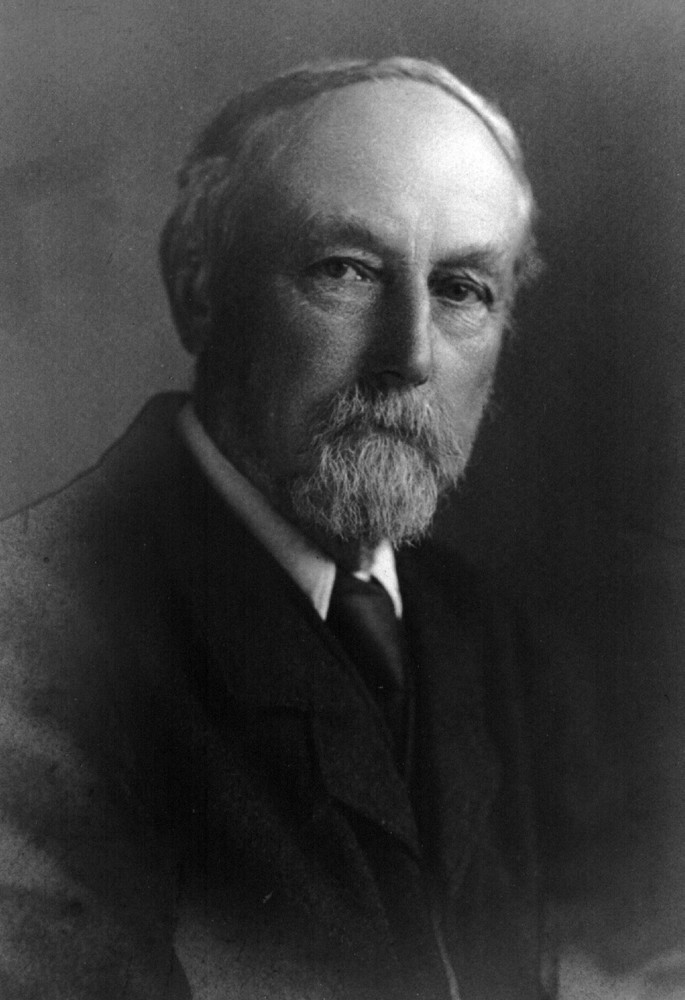
- Born: Henry Shakespear Stephens Salt; 20 September 1851; Naini Tal, British India
- Died: 19 April 1939 (aged 87); Brighton, England
- Resting place: Brighton Crematorium
- Citizenship: British
- Education: Eton College; King's College, Cambridge
- Occupations: Writer; social reformer
- Known for: Animal rights advocacy; Founding the Humanitarian League; Influence on Gandhi
- Notable work: Animals' Rights: Considered in Relation to Social Progress (1892)
- Spouses: Catherine (Kate) Leigh Joynes (m. 1879; died 1919) Catherine Mandeville (m. 1927)
- Relatives: Rev. James Leigh Joynes (father-in-law); James Leigh Joynes (brother-in-law)

Henry Shakespear Stephens Salt (/sɔːlt, sɒlt/; 20 September 1851 – 19 April 1939) was a British writer and social reformer. He campaigned on prison reform, education, economic institutions, vegetarianism, anti-vivisectionism, pacifism, and the treatment of animals. Salt was also a literary critic, biographer, classical scholar, and naturalist. He introduced Mohandas Gandhi to the writings of Henry David Thoreau, and influenced Gandhi's views on vegetarianism. The International Vegetarian Union has described Salt as the "father of animal rights"; his Animals' Rights: Considered in Relation to Social Progress (1892) was among the first works to argue explicitly for animal rights, rather than only for improved animal welfare.

== Biography ==
=== Early life and career ===
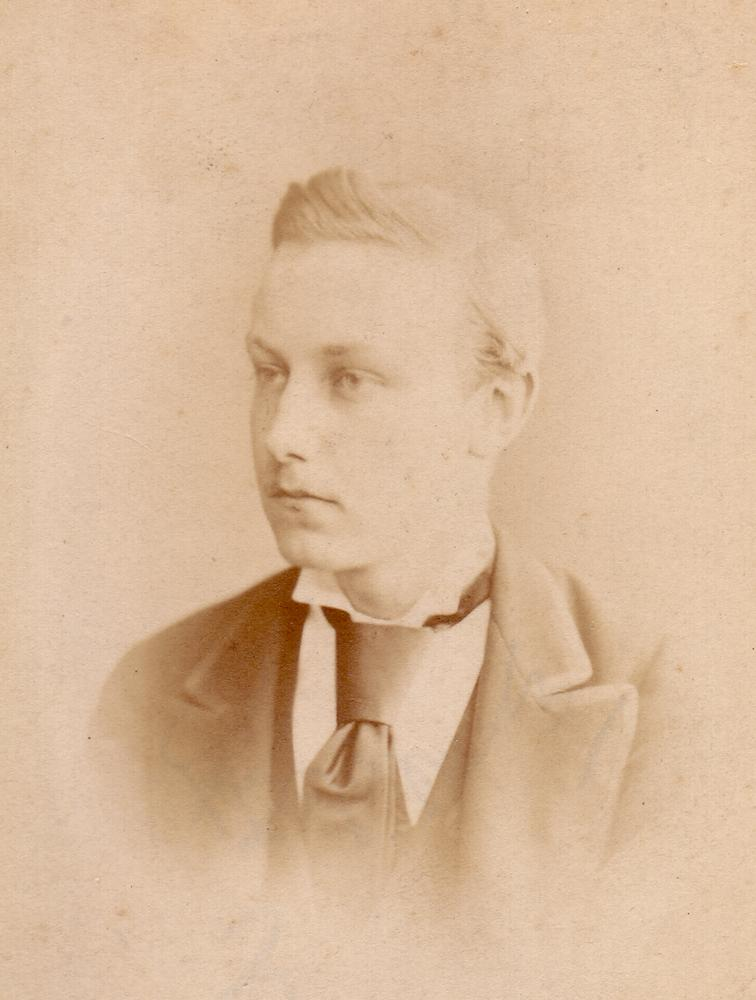
Salt as an Eton master in 1871

Henry Shakespear Stephens Salt was born in Naini Tal, British India, on 20 September 1851, the son of a British Army colonel. In 1852, while still an infant, he moved with his family to England. He was a King's Scholar at Eton College and later read classics at King's College, Cambridge, where he studied the classical tripos. He won the Browne Medal in 1874 for Greek epigrams and graduated with a first-class degree in 1875.

After graduating, Salt returned to Eton as an assistant master and taught classics. In 1879, he married Catherine (Kate) Leigh Joynes, the daughter of a fellow Eton master. He remained at Eton until 1884, when he left the school and moved with his wife to a cottage at Tilford, Surrey. They grew their own vegetables and lived on a small pension that Salt had accumulated. He devoted himself to writing and became involved in humanitarian reform, later co-founding the Humanitarian League.

=== Writing and influence ===
Salt wrote around 40 books. His first, A Plea for Vegetarianism (1886), was published by the Vegetarian Society. In 1890, he published a biography of Henry David Thoreau, one of two interests, with vegetarianism, that later connected him with Mahatma Gandhi. He also wrote, in On Cambrian and Cumbrian Hills (1922), about the need for nature conservation to protect the British countryside from commercial vandalism.

Salt's friends and associates included figures from late 19th- and early 20th-century literary and political life, including Algernon Charles Swinburne, John Galsworthy, James Leigh Joynes, Edward Carpenter, Thomas Hardy, Rudyard Kipling, Havelock Ellis, Leo Tolstoy, William Morris, Arnold Hills, Ralph Hodgson, Peter Kropotkin, Ouida, J. Howard Moore, Ernest Bell, George Bernard Shaw, Robert Cunninghame-Graham, James Keir Hardie, Hubert Bland, and Annie Besant.

=== Activism ===
==== Vegetarianism ====
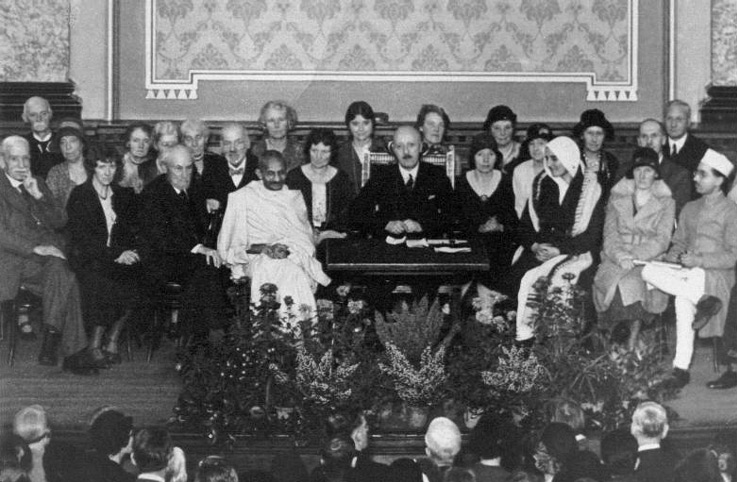
Salt and Gandhi at the Vegetarian Society in London, in 1931

Salt's vegetarianism developed alongside his social, political, and religious views. He was influenced by Shelley, whom he regarded as a mentor, and by Howard Williams's The Ethics of Diet, which he praised for its treatment of humane diet. Salt argued that meat, commonly treated as food, was the flesh of animals slaughtered in harsh conditions. Sky Duthie writes that Salt connected the treatment of animals with other forms of violence and injustice, including war, imperialism, and the effects of competitive capitalism.

In 1885, Salt became a vice-president of the Vegetarian Society. The following year, he published A Plea for Vegetarianism and Other Essays, a collection that set out his rational approach to vegetarian advocacy. Salt treated vegetarianism as part of a wider reform movement that he called "humanitarianism".

Salt's writings influenced Gandhi's move from religiously based vegetarianism to ethical vegetarianism. Gandhi encountered Salt's Plea for Vegetarianism in a London vegetarian restaurant, read it, and later wrote that the book strengthened his commitment to the diet. Gandhi supported the British vegetarian movement and shared a platform with Salt at a 1931 London Vegetarian Society meeting, where he gave the speech "The Moral Basis of Vegetarianism".

==== Humanitarian League ====
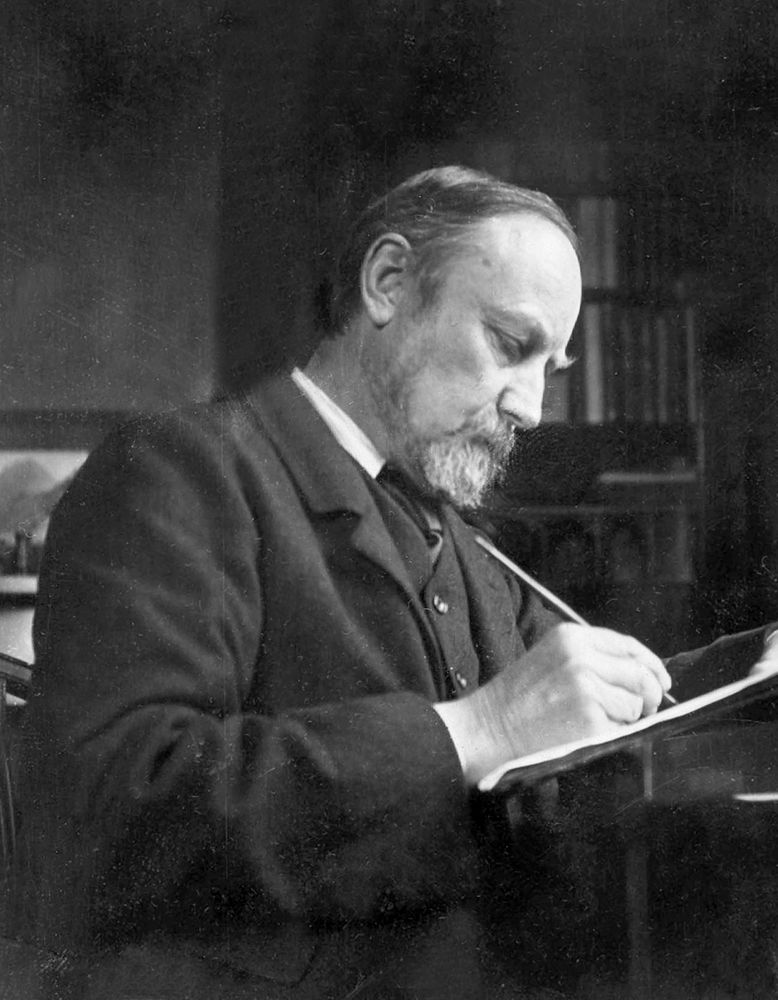
Salt in his study

In 1891, Salt co-founded the Humanitarian League, which campaigned for social and legal reforms based on the principle of humaneness. Its outlook drew on the view that scientific advances and evolutionary biology had weakened established distinctions between races, classes, and species. The League was associated with early organised humanism and included members such as Howard Williams, Alice Drakoules, Edward Maitland, and Kenneth Romanes. It opened a London office in 1895, launched the journal Humanity, and held the first National Humanitarian Conference. From 1897 to 1919, it was based at Chancery Lane and campaigned against corporal punishment, blood sports, and other practices it regarded as cruel. After Salt stepped down in 1919, the League dissolved. In 1924, former members founded the League Against Cruel Sports.

==== Animal rights ====
In Salt's essay "A Good Taste in Diet", published in A Plea for Vegetarianism and Other Essays (1886), he wrote:

Can any thoughtful man, in the face of such horrors, deliberately choose to be a flesh-eater? Must he not rather turn with relief to a vegetarian diet, with which alone can exist that widely sympathetic intellectual gentleness which recognises the rights, not of man only, but of all the animal creation.

Keith Tester writes that, in 1892, Salt created an "epistemological break" by being the first writer to discuss animal rights explicitly, rather than only better animal welfare. In Animals' Rights: Considered in Relation to Social Progress, Salt wrote that he wanted to "set the principle of animals' rights on a consistent and intelligible footing, [and] to show that this principle underlies the various efforts of humanitarian reformers ...":

Even the leading advocates of animal rights seem to have shrunk from basing their claim on the only argument which can ultimately be held to be a really sufficient one--the assertion that animals, as well as men, though, of course, to a far less extent than men, are possessed of a distinctive individuality, and, therefore, are in justice entitled to live their lives with a due measure of that 'restricted freedom' to which Herbert Spencer alludes.

Salt argued that rights should not be claimed for animals while being subordinated to human interests. He rejected the assumption that a human life necessarily has more value than a non-human life:

[The] notion of the life of an animal having 'no moral purpose,' belongs to a class of ideas which cannot possibly be accepted by the advanced humanitarian thought of the present day--it is a purely arbitrary assumption, at variance with our best instincts, at variance with our best science, and absolutely fatal (if the subject be clearly thought out) to any full realization of animals' rights. If we are ever going to do justice to the lower races, we must get rid of the antiquated notion of a 'great gulf' fixed between them and mankind, and must recognize the common bond of humanity that unites all living beings in one universal brotherhood.

=== Later life and death ===
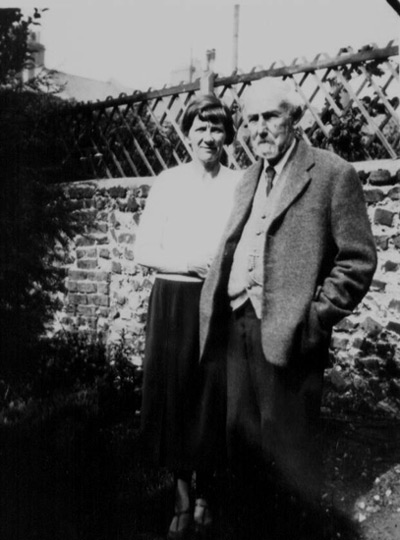
Salt with his second wife Catherine

Salt's first wife died in 1919; after her death, he closed down the Humanitarian League. Salt married Catherine Mandeville on 25 March 1927. In 1935, he published The Creed of Kinship, in which he criticised established religions and set out his own philosophy, "the creed of kinship". It called for recognition of the evolutionary and biological affinity between humans and other animals.

Salt suffered a stroke in 1933. He died six years later at Brighton Municipal Hospital, on 19 April 1939, aged 87; his remains were cremated at Brighton Crematorium.

== Legacy ==
The first biography of Salt, Salt and His Circle, was published by Stephen Winsten, with a preface by George Bernard Shaw, in 1951. A second biography, George Hendrick's Henry Salt: Humanitarian Reformer and Man of Letters, was published in 1977.

Salt's Animals' Rights was reissued in 1980. In the preface, philosopher Peter Singer described it as the best 18th- or 19th-century book on animal rights and wrote that Salt anticipated many issues in the modern animal rights debate.

The Henry S. Salt Society was formed to publish information about Salt's life, works, friends, and fellow activists.

== Selected publications ==
- Popular Fallacies; or, Answers to Objections. London Vegetarian Society.
- A Plea for Vegetarianism and Other Essays. Manchester: Vegetarian Society. 1886.
- A Shelley Primer. London: Reeves and Turner. 1887.
- Rhyme and Reason: Verses Reprinted from "Justice". London: Modern Press. 1887.
- Flesh or Fruit? An Essay on Food Reform. London: W. Reeves. 1888.
- Literary Sketches. London: Swan Sonnenschein & Co. 1888.
- Percy Bysshe Shelley: A Monograph. London: Swan Sonnenschein, Lowrey & Co. 1888.
- The Life of James Thomson (B.V.). London: Reeves and Turner. 1889.
- Life of Henry David Thoreau. London: Richard Bentley and Son. 1890.
- Animals' Rights: Considered in Relation to Social Progress. London: George Bell and Sons. 1892.
- Shelley's Principles: Has Time Refuted or Confirmed Them?. London: William Reeves. 1892.
- Tennyson as a Thinker. London: William Reeves. 1893.
- Cruelties of Civilization: A Program of Humane Reform. The Bellamy Library. London: William Reeves for the Humanitarian League. 1894.
- Richard Jefferies: A Study. The Dilettante Library. London: S. Sonnenschein & Co. 1894.
- Richard Jefferies: A Study. The Dilettante Library. New York: Macmillan & Co. 1894.
- Selections from Thoreau. The Eversley Series. London: Macmillan. 1895.
- Percy Bysshe Shelley: Poet and Pioneer. London: William Reeves. 1896.
- Percy Bysshe Shelley: Poet and Pioneer. New York: Charles Scribner's Sons. 1896.
- The Logic of Vegetarianism: Essays and Dialogues. Vegetarian Jubilee Library. London: The Ideal Publishing Union, Limited. 1899.
- De Quincey. Bell's Miniature Series of Great Writers. London: George Allen & Unwin. 1904.
- Richard Jefferies: His Life and His Ideas. Simple Life Series. London: A. C. Fifield. 1905.
- The Faith of Richard Jefferies. London: Watts & Co. 1906.
- Eton Under Hornby. London: A. C. Fifield. 1907.
- Cambrian and Cumbrian Hills: Pilgrimages to Snowdon and Scafell. London: C. W. Daniel. 1908.
- The Humanities of Diet. Manchester: Vegetarian Society. 1914.
- Killing for Sport: Essays by Various Writers. Preface by George Bernard Shaw. London: George Bell & Sons. 1915 [1914].
- The Flogging Craze: A Statement of the Case Against Corporal Punishment. Foreword by Sir George Greenwood. London: George Allen & Unwin. 1916.
- Seventy Years among Savages. London: George Allen & Unwin. 1921.
- Call of the Wildflower. London: George Allen & Unwin. 1922.
- The Story of My Cousins. London: Watts & Co. 1923.
- Homo Rapiens and Other Verses. London: Watts & Co. 1926.
- Our Vanishing Wildflowers. London: Watts & Co. 1928.
- Memories of Bygone Eton. London: Hutchinson & Co. 1928.
- The Heart of Socialism: Letters to a Public School Man. Westminster: Independent Labour Party Publication Department. 1928.
- Company I Have Kept. London: George Allen & Unwin. 1930.
- Cum Grano. Berkeley Heights, NJ: Oriole Press. 1931.
- The Creed of Kinship. New York: E. P. Dutton & Co., Inc. 1935.

=== Translations by Henry Salt ===
- Virgil (1926). The Story of Dido and Aeneas. London: Watts & Co.
- Virgil (1928). The Story of Aeneas. Cambridge University Press.

== See also ==
- Books by Henry Stephens Salt
- List of animal rights advocates
- History of animal rights
- History of vegetarianism
- Vegetarianism in the Victorian era
