= Allinson (surname) =

Allinson is a surname. Notable people with the surname include:

- Adrian Allinson, British painter
- Alex Allinson, Manx politician
- Alfred Richard Allinson, British academic
- Anna Allinson, German-born painter and social reformer
- Bertrand P. Allinson, British physician
- Darren Allinson, Welsh rugby union player
- Francesca Allinson, English polymath
- Ian Allinson, English footballer
- Leonard Allinson, British diplomat
- Lloyd Allinson, English footballer
- Mark Allinson, British historian
- Michael Allinson, British-American actor
- Robert Allinson, American philosopher
- Richard Allinson, British broadcaster
- Thomas Allinson, British doctor
- Vera Allinson, British screenwriter
