= Dunderdale =

Dunderdale may refer to:

== People ==
- Betty, Hazel, and Julie Dunderdale, members of the 60s English vocal trio The Dale Sisters
- David Dunderdale, English owner of the Castleford Pottery
- Joe Dunderdale (born 1992), British athlete
- Kathy Dunderdale (born 1952), Canadian politician
- Len Dunderdale (1915–1989), English footballer
- Tommy Dunderdale (1887–1960), Australian-Canadian ice hockey player
- Wilfred Dunderdale (1899–1990), British spy and intelligence officer

== Places ==
- Dunderdale Creek, Warren County, Pennsylvania, U.S.
