= Queen's Mill =

Building in Castleford, West Yorkshire, England

Coordinates: 53.7280°N 1.3534°W

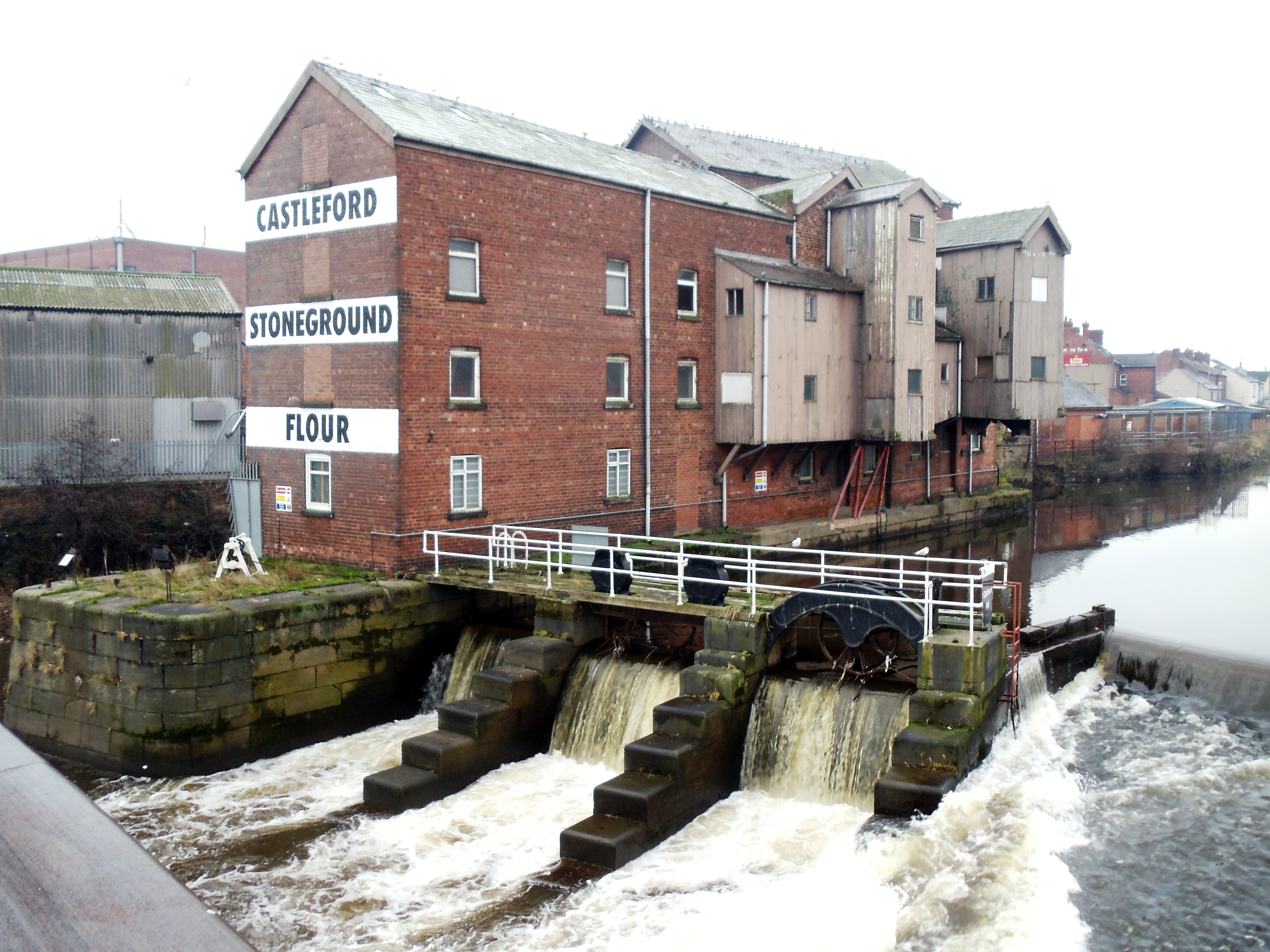
The building, in 2012

Queen's Mill is a historic building in Castleford, a town in West Yorkshire, in England.

A watermill on the River Aire in Castleford was first recorded in 1093, while a weir was constructed alongside in 1155. In 1740, the timber mill building was reconstructed in stone. In 1782, the mill was purchased by the Aire and Calder Navigation. By 1816, it housed two companies, one grinding corn to make flour, and the other grinding bone for use by the Castleford Pottery. In 1887, it was renamed "Queen's Mill", in honour of the Golden Jubilee of Queen Victoria. In 1892, it became the first building in the town to have electric lighting, powered by the waterwheel.

In 1896, the mill was purchased by Harry Goodall & Company, which used it to manufacture fortified wheat under the name "Triticine". However, the building suffered a major fire in 1897, and the company went out of business. The mill remained empty until 1921, when it was purchased by Allinson and restored. The waterwheel remained in use until 1970.

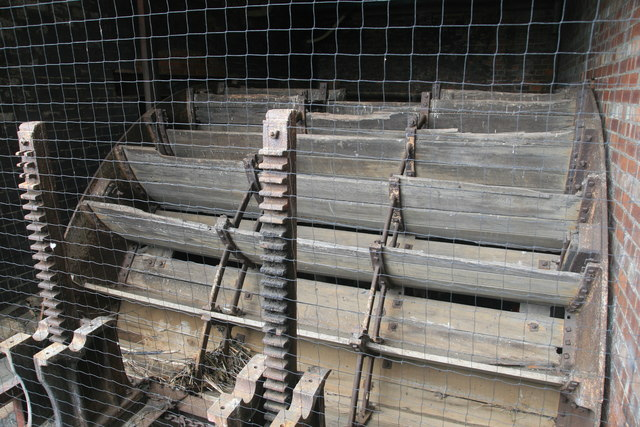
The waterwheel

Between 1979 and 1980, Allinson enlarged the mill, and then centralised its milling of stoneground wheat flour at the site. This made it the world's largest stoneground flour mill, with 20 pairs of millstones. Following mergers, the mill passed to ADM Milling, which closed it in 2010.

In 2013, the mill was purchased by the Castleford Heritage Trust. The trust began milling flour on a small scale in 2015. In 2023, the trust received a £900,000 grant to begin renovation work on the mill, allowing it to host events and provide additional space for businesses. Tenants in the building include the Queen's Mill Tea Rooms, which in 2022 received the England Business Award for best tearooms in Yorkshire.
