= Michael Allinson =

English stage and film actor (1920–2010)

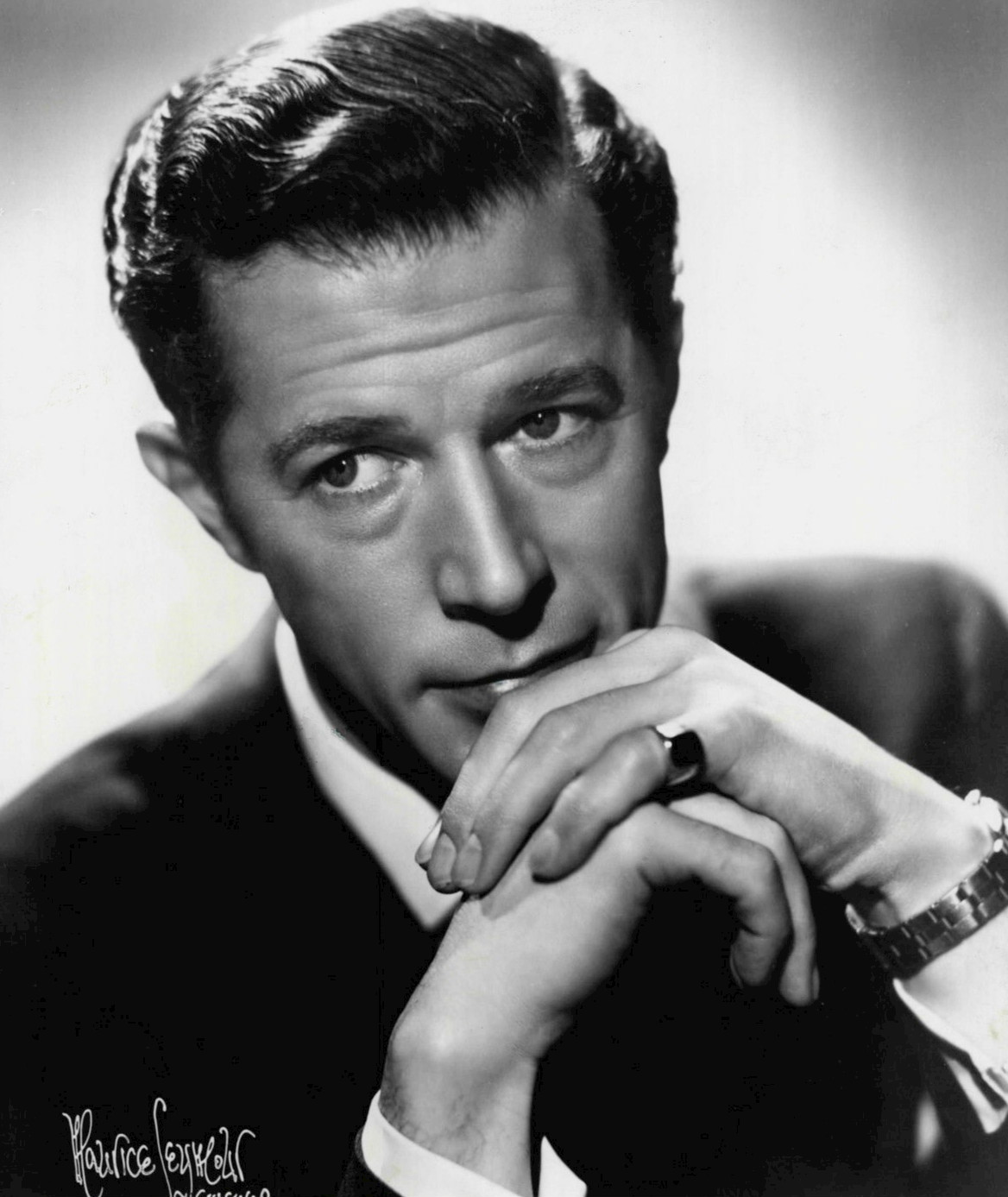
- Allinson in 1964
- Born: John Michael Allinson; 30 December 1920; London, England, UK
- Died: 30 December 2010 (aged 90); Los Angeles, California, US
- Occupation: Actor
- Years active: 1958–2005

Michael Allinson (30 December 1920 – 30 December 2010) was a British-American stage and film actor.

== Biography ==
John Michael Allinson was born on 30 December 1920 in London, the son of British painter and sculptor Adrian Allinson, founding member of the avant garde London Group of painters. He was the grandson of doctor and nutritionist Thomas Allinson, the founder of the Allinson Bread Company. He attended Ryeford Hall, Wycliffe College, Gloucestershire and the University of Lausanne. Allinson was trained for the stage at the Royal Academy of Dramatic Art. Allinson served as a captain during World War II.

Allinson emigrated to the United States in the summer of 1958. He became a naturalised United States citizen on 30 November 1964.

== Acting career ==
Allinson performed extensively on Broadway, where he took over the role of Professor Henry Higgins in My Fair Lady during the 1960 season opposite Pamela Charles as Eliza Doolittle, having toured as standby for Rex Harrison. On Broadway he also created the role of "Warnie" in the original production of Shadowlands, starring Nigel Hawthorne and Jane Alexander. He appeared as Hobson in the short lived musical Arthur, based on the Dudley Moore film of the same name.

He appeared on Broadway productions in, among other shows, An Ideal Husband, Oliver!, Angel Street, Coco, Sleuth, and Hostile Witness. He also portrayed Sir Arthur Sullivan in the Huntington Theatre Company's 1985 production of Kenneth Ludwig's play Sullivan & Gilbert at the Boston University Theatre.

Allinson was President Emeritus of the Players' Club, installed after the exit of Lynn Redgrave. Allinson understudied both Rex Harrison and George Rose in the production of Kingfisher and did a one-man show, "Meet George Orwell," that he performed at the John Kennedy Presidential Library Theatre in Boston and Trinity College, Oxford, among other venues, in the 1990s. (See Footnote 3 in the Wikipedia article about the playwright, Mark Weston).

Allinson appeared in many films, his last role being "Sir David" in Syriana.

== Family ==
His wife, the late Judi Schiver, was a dancer in the original Broadway production of Camelot; they had sons, David, born 1962, and Timothy, born 1963.

== Death ==
Michael Allinson died on his 90th birthday in 2010, in Los Angeles, California.
