= Cycling in the United Kingdom =

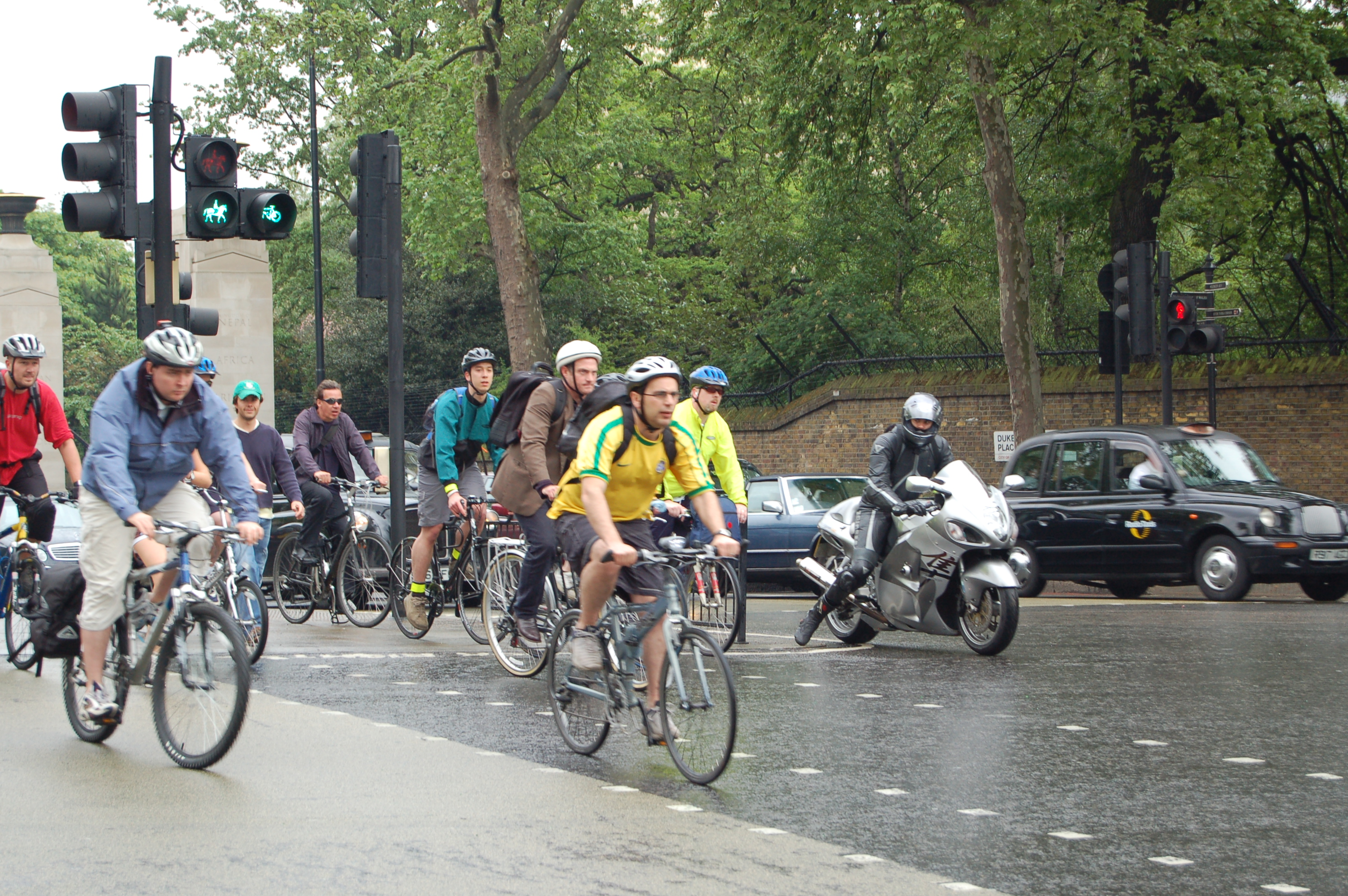
Cyclists at Hyde Park corner in London

Cycling in the United Kingdom has a long history, since the earliest days of the bicycle, and after a decline in the mid-20th century has been undergoing a resurgence in recent decades.

== History ==
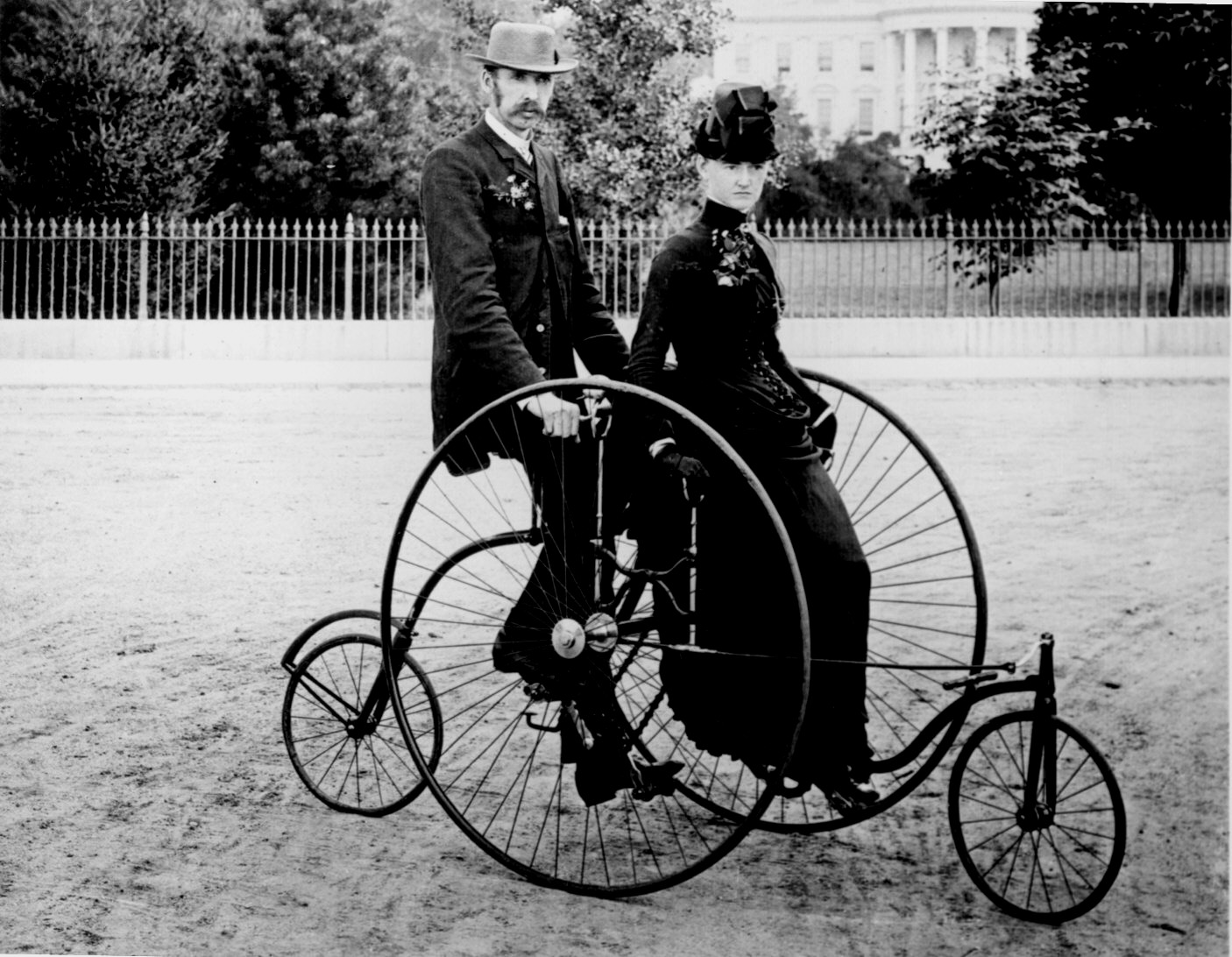
A couple seated on an 1886 Coventry Rotary Quadracycle for two

John Kemp Starley, a 19th-century English inventor is often considered the inventor of the modern bicycle. He began producing the Rover Safety Bicycle in 1885.

In the late 19th century, the city of Coventry was the largest producer of bicycles in the world.

The National Clarion Cycling Club, which has member sections across the country, was started in the 1890s and was instrumental in the promotion of the socialist movement as well as the growth in popularity of cycling.

The Vegetarian Cycling Club (later the Vegetarian Cycling and Athletic Club) was founded in London in 1888 to bring together vegetarian cyclists and demonstrate their ability in competition. It became a successful cycling club, with members including George Olley, Freddie Grubb, and Charlie Davey, and six riders selected for the road race at the 1912 Summer Olympics.

== Utility cycling ==
The numbers of people commuting to work by bicycle increased by 17% to 760,000 in England and Wales between 2001 and 2011, a total proportion of 2.9% of all commuters.

At the governmental level, cycling is a responsibility of the Department for Transport. Cycling UK advocates in the areas of utility and recreational cyclists, as opposed to cycle sport which is governed by British Cycling.

Initiatives such as the Cycle to Work scheme are designed to encourage cycling as a mode of transport, particularly for its environmental benefits against automobile use.

The DfT administers the Bikeability national cycle training programme, which educates both children and adults in bike handling skills and vehicular cycling on public roads.

== Policy ==
Active travel is devolved to the Scottish Parliament and Welsh Parliament. The UK Parliament has overall responsibility for active travel policy in England, which is delegated to Active Travel England, an agency of the Department for Transport.

=== England ===
In 2017, the Government published a Cycling and Walking Investment Strategy, which introduced Local Cycling and Walking Inferastructure Plans, which local authorities could produce to guide investment in active travel infrastructure. The Government set a deadline of November 2019 for local authorities to produce a plan.

In 2020, the Prime Minister Boris Johnson announced new funding for active travel infrastructure in England outside London. In July 2020, the Department for Transport published Gear Change: A bold vision for cycling and walking. The Government's stated aim is for England to be a "great walking and cycling nation" and for half of all journeys in towns and cities being walked or cycled by 2030. The plan accompanies £2 billion in additional funding over the following five years for cycling and walking announced in May 2020. The plan also introduced a new body and inspectorate known as Active Travel England.

Alongside the plan, the Government produced a new guidance document for cycling infrastructure standards.

=== Scotland ===
In 2014, the Scottish Government published the Long-Term Vision for Active Travel in Scotland 2030. Subsequently, they published the National Walking Strategy and Cycling Action Plan for Scotland 2017-2020. In 2018, Scotland appointed an Active Nation Commissioner Lee Craigie, who is a national advocate for Active Travel.

=== Wales ===
Active travel policy in Wales is governed by the Active Travel (Wales) Act 2013 and the Active Travel Action Plan for Wales. The Welsh Government aims for walking and cycling to become the preferred ways of getting around over shorter distances.

== Cycle infrastructure standards ==
Standards for cycle infrastructure have gradually evolved over time to require better segregation and wider lanes for safety reasons. The most recent nationwide cycle design guidance for England is Local Transport Note 1/20, released in July 2020. It is not a requirement for cycle infrastructure to follow this, but most highway authorities have adopted it as their standards. National Highways have their own guidance for trunk road called CD 195 which was based on IAN 195/16 originally issued in October 2016. Much of LTN 1/20 is based upon CD 195.

Transport Scotland issues cycle infrastructure design guidance for Scotland through the Cycling by Design document. In cooperation with Sustrans, an update was issued by Patrick Harvie, Minister for Active Travel, as a response to the growth of active travel infrastructure during the COVID-19 pandemic.

On road cycle-lanes should only be used on roads with 20 mph limit, although use of 30 mph with little traffic is acceptable. Light segregation is recommended for any roads with limits below 30 mph, while any road above 40 mph should be fully segregated from motor traffic. Minimal widths of 1-way cycle tracks is between 2m and 2.5m depending on cycle usage. 2-way cycle tracks should be between 3m and 4m depending on cycle usage. On-road cycle lanes should be 2m wide. Widths can be narrower at isolated sections due to constrains such as trees or street furniture. Cycle tracks should be designed for a travel speed of 20 mph, or 25 mph on downhill gradients.

== Cycle routes ==
The National Cycle Network, created by the charity Sustrans, is the UK's major network of signed routes for cycling. It uses dedicated bike paths as well as roads with minimal traffic, and covers 14,000 miles (23,000 kilometres), passing within 1 mi (2 km) of half of all homes. Other cycling routes such as The National Byway, the Sea to Sea Cycle Route and local cycleways can be found across the country.

Cities and large towns may have their own collection of cycle routes; for example, London's Transport for London has the Cycle Superhighways.

== Cycle sport ==
The governing organisations for cycle sport in the UK is British Cycling and Cycling Ireland.

The 21st century has seen a dramatic increase in the performance of British cyclists at the top levels of international cycling. Great Britain dominated the medal tables in cycling at the 2008, 2012 and 2016 Olympics, while riders such as Bradley Wiggins, Mark Cavendish and Chris Froome have recorded multiple wins in professional road races such as the Tour de France.

Major professional road races include the Tour of Britain, the Tour de Yorkshire, The Women's Tour and the London–Surrey Classic. On the track, the Revolution series events are most prominent. London hosted the 2016 UCI Track Cycling World Championships.

The Tour de France included stages in Britain in 1974, 1994, 2007 and 2014.

=== Velodromes and other permanent tracks ===
There are five Olympic-size indoor velodromes in Britain: the Olympic Velodrome in Lee Valley VeloPark, Manchester Velodrome, the Sir Chris Hoy Velodrome, Wales National Velodrome and Derby Arena.

The National Indoor BMX Arena is located at the National Cycling Centre in Manchester.

== Leisure and mass-participation cycling events ==
Well-known regular events amateur and leisure cyclists include RideLondon and the Dunwich Dynamo. More than 100,000 people took part in cyclosportives in 2014.

== Rules ==
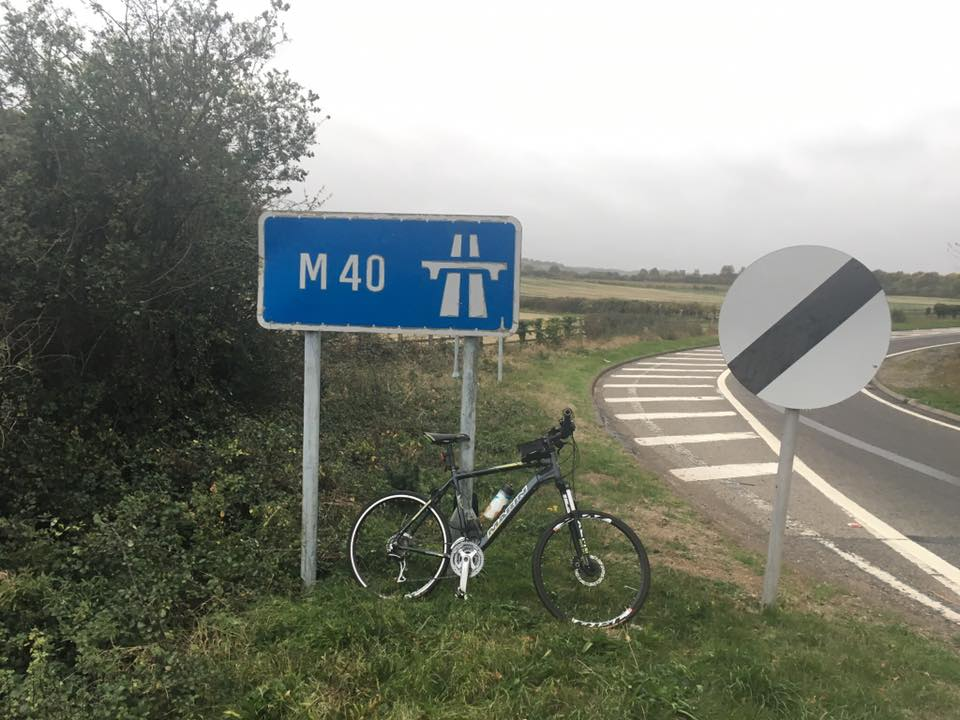
Cyclists may not use the British motorway network.

Cyclists cannot use certain roads in the United Kingdom, most notably Motorways. Further, some roads can be marked off-limits to cyclists by the presence of either a No Cycling sign (a bicycle in a red circle), or a No Vehicles sign (an empty red circle). In the latter case, cycles may be pushed. Other than these restrictions, cyclists can use any public highway in the United Kingdom, such as A roads (including dual carriageways).

The use of dedicated cycle facilities is not compulsory, and use "depends on your experience and skills". However, riding on the pavement is illegal.

Bicycles must furthermore be road-worthy, which in Great Britain means that the bicycle must have "two efficient braking systems" that operate independently on both wheels. This includes fixed-gear bicycles, where backwards pressure on the pedals acts as a brake, so only a front brake is required in this case.

For riding in the hours of darkness between sunset and sunrise, cyclists must have at least a red rear light and a white front light, as well as a red rear reflector and four amber pedal reflectors (one at the back and one at the front on each pedal).

Cycling with a passenger on the saddle, also known as giving a backie, was made illegal by section 24 of the Road Traffic Act 1988.

== See also ==
- Cycling in Cardiff
- Cycling in Leeds
- Cycling in London
- Cycling in Manchester
- List of bicycle-sharing systems
