= Vegetarian Cycling and Athletic Club =

British vegetarian sports club

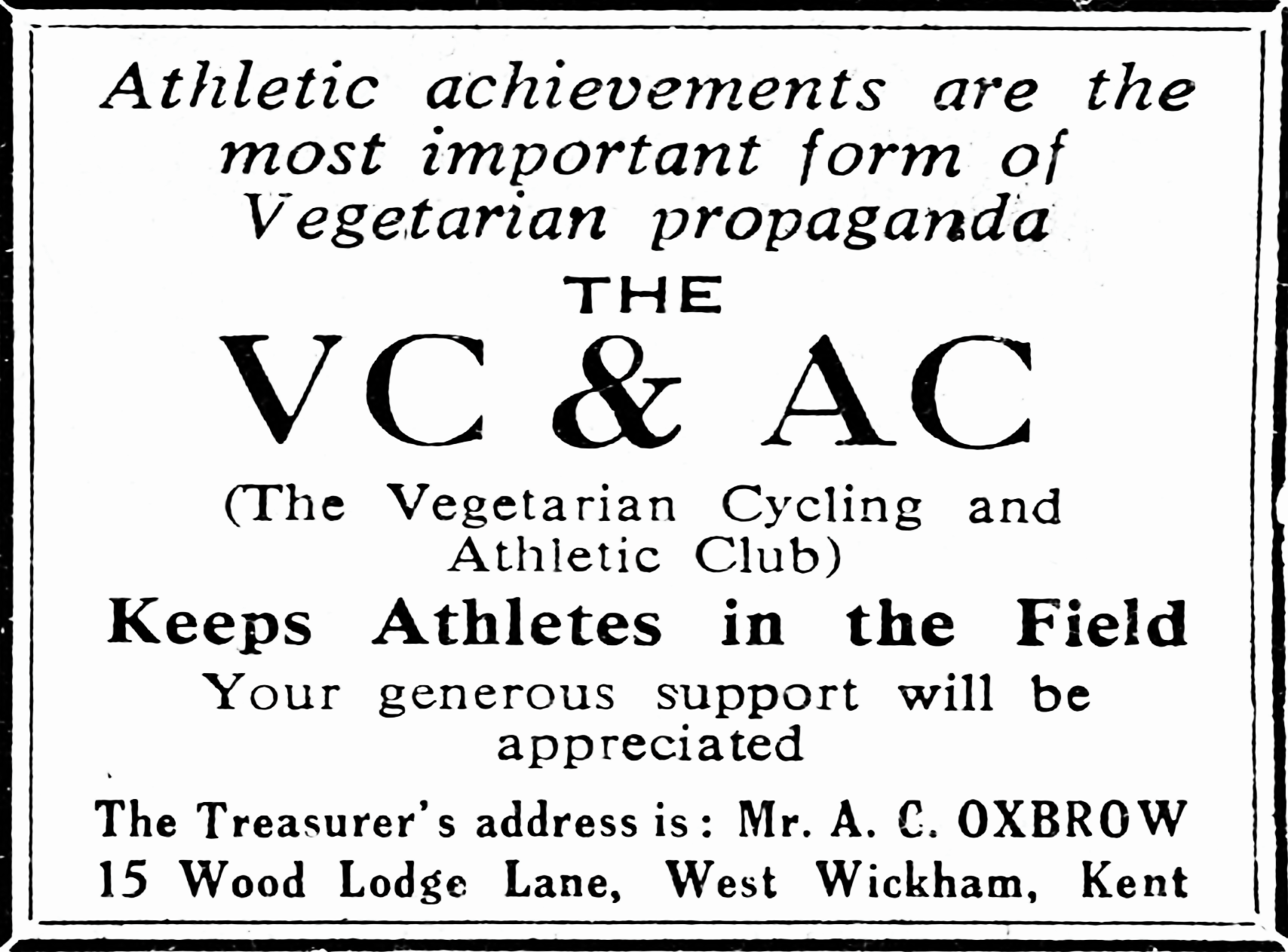
- Advertisement for the club soliciting financial support, 1968
- Abbreviation: VCAC
- Formation: 9 October 1888; 137 years ago
- Founder: Leslie Large
- Founded at: London, England
- Type: Sports club
- Region served: United Kingdom
- First president: Arnold Hills
- Affiliations: British Cycling; British Triathlon Federation; Cycling Time Trials; England Athletics; Vegetarian Society
- Website: vegetariancac.org

The Vegetarian Cycling and Athletic Club (VCAC) is a British sports club for vegetarian cyclists, runners, athletes, and multi-sport competitors. It was founded in London in 1888 as the Vegetarian Cycling Club and adopted its present name in 1909, after its activities had expanded beyond cycling.

The club was formed to bring together vegetarian cyclists and to test, through athletic competition, claims about the physical capacity of vegetarians. Its early officers included Leslie Large as secretary and Arnold Hills as president. The club remains active in the United Kingdom and is affiliated with England Athletics, British Cycling, Cycling Time Trials, British Triathlon Federation, and the Vegetarian Society.

== History ==
=== Formation ===
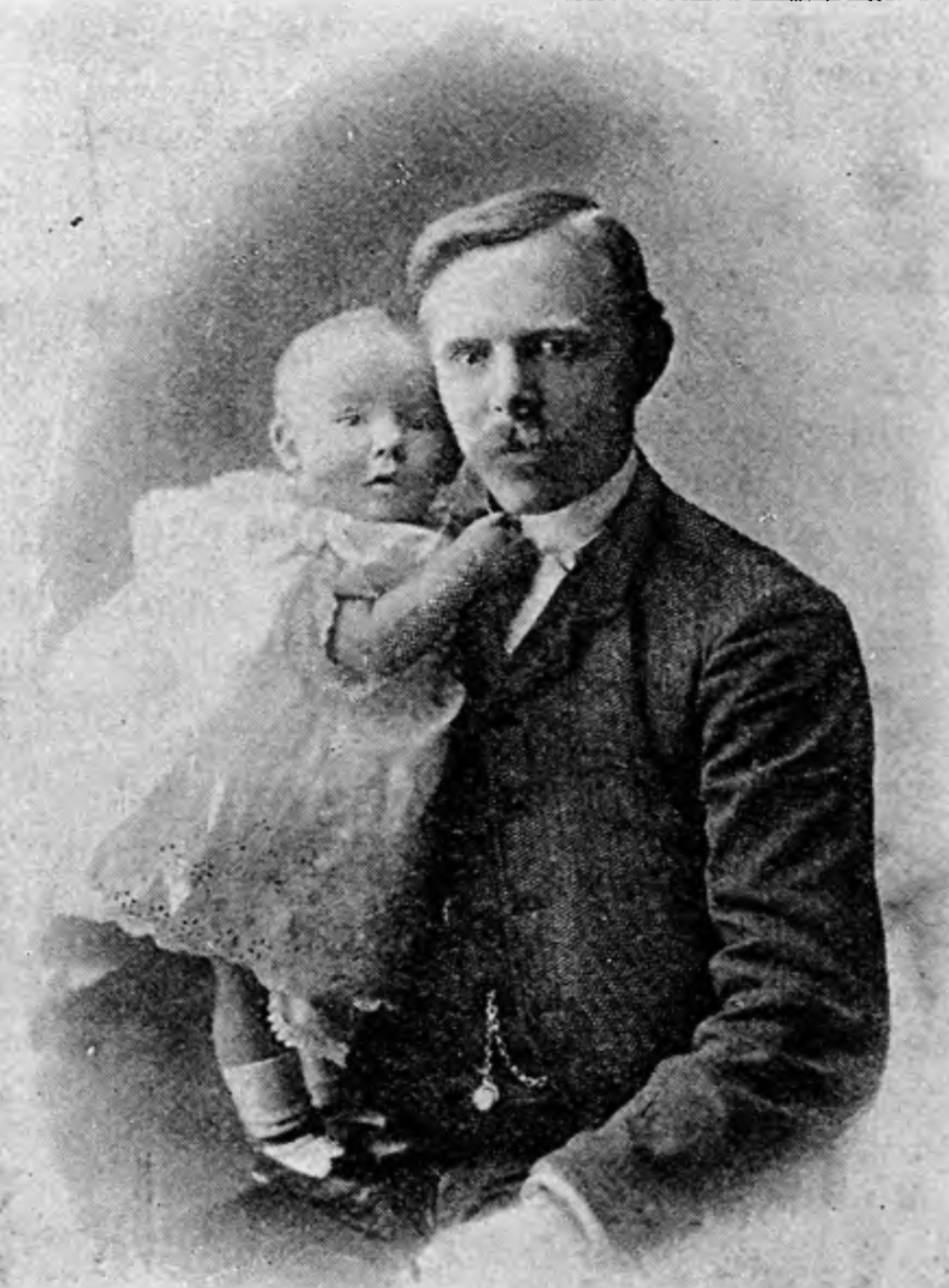
Leslie Large, the club's founder, c. 1894

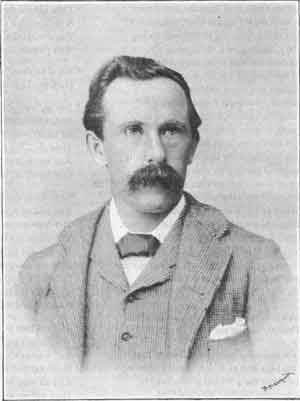
Arnold Hills, the club's first president, 1889

In September 1887, Leslie Large of Lewisham placed notices in periodicals asking vegetarian cyclists to contact him about forming a club. A notice in The Vegetarian Messenger described the proposed club's qualifications as "abstinence from flesh-food and riding a machine", and gave its objects as collecting information about vegetarian cyclists and arranging runs for members in south-east London.

The club's first formal meeting was held in London on 9 October 1888. Large was elected as the first secretary and Arnold Hills became the first president. The organisation was named the Vegetarian Cycling Club.

Charles W. Forward later wrote that an earlier Akreophagists (Note: An akreophagist is a non-flesh-eater.) Cycling Club had been formed about 1881 but had been short-lived, and that the Vegetarian Cycling Club was formed in 1888, with Large taking a leading part in its foundation. Forward also stated that the first recorded minutes of the club were from a committee meeting held on 13 May 1889 at 323 High Holborn, London.

=== Membership and officers ===
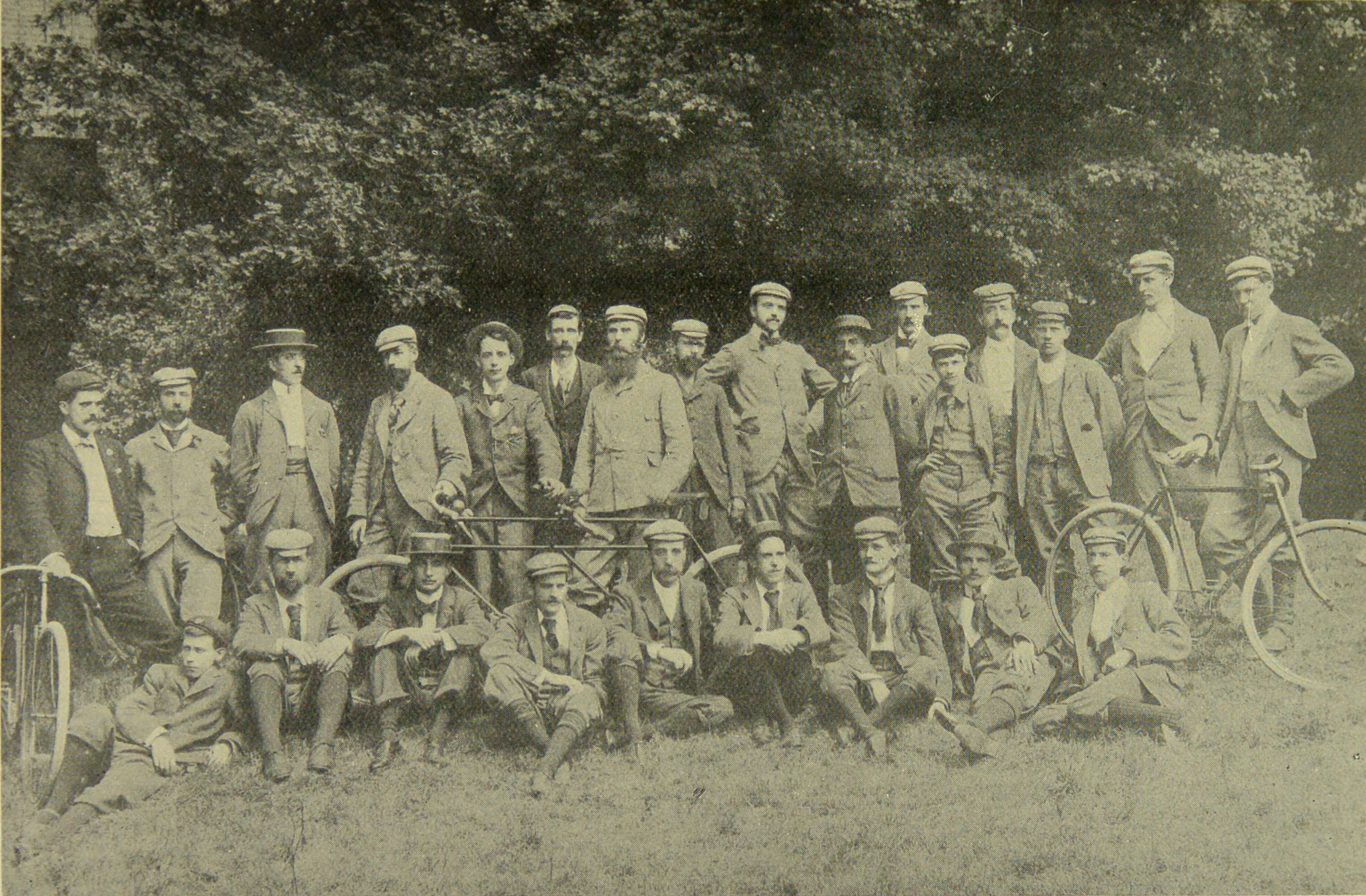
The Vegetarian Cycling Club in Richmond Park, 1896

By 1888, The Vegetarian Messenger reported that the club had 71 members after a moonlight run from Hyde Park Corner to Kingston, with a stop for a "tomato supper" at a temperance house. In 1889, a general meeting at the Apple Tree Restaurant, London Wall, reported a nucleus of about 100 members and elected officers including Hills as president, Rev. Professor John E. B. Mayor, Thomas Allinson, and others as vice-presidents, W. H. Browne as captain, A. J. Doult as treasurer, and Large as honorary secretary.

In 1896, the club elected 27 new members, 13 of them women, and formed a ladies' section at a meeting at the home of C. L. H. Wallace. Miss Munro became secretary of the section and Mrs H. Schultess-Young became its captain.

By 1897, the club had about 90 members, around half of whom were described by Forward as active members. Its officers included Arnold F. Hills as president, Henry Light as captain, H. D. Kerr as treasurer, and C. D. Lloyd as honorary general secretary.

=== Early cycling activity ===
Henry Light, a founder member, was elected captain in 1890. The club later credited him with raising its competitive standards. In 1896, Jim Parsley of Peckham won the Catford Hill Climb in a record time, an event described in the club's history as its first major competitive success. The club held a dinner in Parsley's honour and presented Light with an iron-framed pianoforte for his work for the organisation.

George Antony Olley was among the club's early long-distance cyclists. He set records including London-Portsmouth-London, London-Edinburgh, the 1,000-mile record, and Land's End to John o' Groats in 1907 and 1908.

Freddie Grubb later became one of the club’s leading riders, setting national records on both road and track and becoming the first British cyclist to enter the Giro d'Italia, in 1914.

=== Expansion and name change ===
By the early 20th century, the club had expanded beyond cycling. Its members included athletes in boxing, wrestling, tennis, walking, and swimming. The Bacon brothers competed in boxing and wrestling, Eustace Miles was an English tennis champion, and George Allan walked from Land's End to John o' Groats in 1904 and 1908. The club changed its name to the Vegetarian Cycling and Athletic Club in 1909.

In 1912, six club members were selected for the Olympic road race in Stockholm. Sporting activity declined during the First World War, when the club continued as a social organisation but did not hold formal athletic activities.

=== Interwar period ===
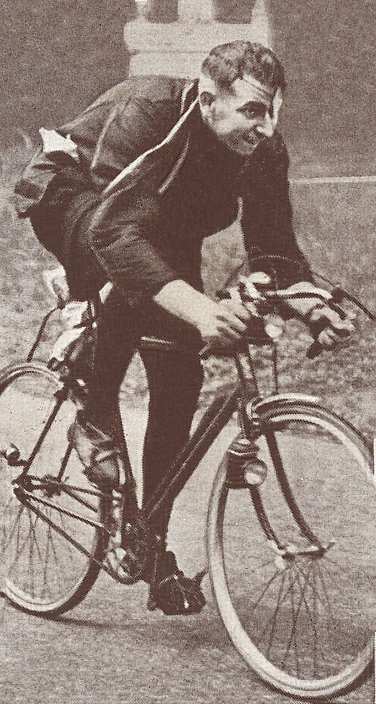
Sid Ferris, 1939

After the First World War, Charlie Davey became one of the club's leading cyclists. He broke several Road Records Association records between 1914 and 1926, held the 24-hour tandem paced track record, and competed in open events from 50 miles to 24 hours. He turned professional in 1923 and later worked as a manager and mentor to riders.

During the 1930s, the club was active in time trialling and road records. It won the Cycling magazine British Best All-Rounder shield in 1930, 1931, and 1932. Sid Ferris, after a career as an amateur, turned professional and broke several Road Records Association records in 1937 and 1938, including Edinburgh to London, Land's End to John o' Groats, the 1,000-mile record, and the 24-hour record. Pearl Wellington broke five women's Road Records Association records between 1935 and 1938. Walter Greaves set a year's mileage record of 45,383 miles in 1936.

=== Post-war period ===
After the Second World War, Dave Keeler became one of the club's leading cyclists. In 1949, he represented Great Britain at the World Student Games in Budapest on the track and road. In 1951, he twice lowered the 25-mile time trial record, set the 30-mile competition record, became Scottish 25-mile champion, won the Welsh 50-mile championship, and won the 4,000-metre pursuit title on the track. In 1958, he broke the Southern Road Records Association London-Southampton-Dover-London record and lowered Sid Ferris's Land's End to John o' Groats record.

During the 1960s, Malcolm Amey, Graham West, and Tom Smith achieved top-ten placings in the British Best All-Rounder competition. West also became National 50 Mile Champion.

=== Late 20th century and later activity ===
In the 1980s, Kathy Akoslovski (née Bellingham) set women's Road Records Association and regional records, including Birmingham to London. Ron Murgatroyd, Harvey Greenhalgh, and Doug Griffiths also appeared in veterans' time trial results.

In the 1990s, running and multi-sport events became a larger part of the club's activity. A men's team won the team prize at the 1996 Chingford Orion 10-mile road race. Richard Jordan, Danielle Sanderson, Gert Cowling, Brian Bosher, and Job King were among the club's runners during this period. Ron Franklin, whose career began in the 1950s, represented Wales at the 1958 Commonwealth Games and won Welsh championship medals.

In the late 1990s and early 2000s, members competed in triathlon, duathlon, mountain biking, cyclo-cross, time trialling, and running. Anna Berrill represented the Great Britain age-group team at the World Triathlon Championships in 1997 and 1998. Lesley Cliff won the World Standard Distance Triathlon Championship in the V55 age category in 2003 and 2004. Judith Shakeshaft competed for Wales in mountain bike and cyclo-cross events and won Welsh championships.

=== International vegetarian movement ===
Henry B. Amos, general secretary of the VCAC, was the club's official delegate at the 1923 International Vegetarian Union Congress in Stockholm, where he presented a paper titled "Diet for Strength". Amos was again the club's delegate at the 1926 congress in London. At that congress, Henry Light spoke in a discussion on dietary protein standards and physical work. The minutes of the IVU business meeting in 1965 recorded that Cyril Oliver gave a report for the club.

== Aims and activities ==
The club's constitutional objects are the promotion of sport among vegetarians and the promotion of vegetarianism among sportspeople.

The club is mainly based in the United Kingdom and has members in running, cycling, athletics, and multi-sport. Milton Keynes City Council describes its membership as ranging from commuting cyclists to high-level competitors. The club is affiliated with England Athletics, British Cycling, Cycling Time Trials, British Triathlon Federation, and the Vegetarian Society.

== See also ==
- History of vegetarianism
- Vegetarianism in the Victorian era
- Cycling in the United Kingdom
- Sport in the United Kingdom
