= Allinson =

- Allinson wholemeal bread loaves in 2026
- Current owner: Associated British Foods
- Country: United Kingdom
- Introduced: 1892
- Markets: Bread
- Website: https://www.allinsonsbread.co.uk/

Allinson is a brand of bread and flour manufactured by Associated British Foods.

== History ==
Dr Thomas Allinson was born in the Hulme district of Manchester in 1858. He trained as a medical doctor in Edinburgh, graduating in 1879. Between 1880 And 1884 he worked as an assistant in a General practice. In 1889 he released a book, The Advantages of Wholemeal Bread.

He founded the first Allinson mill in 1892 in Bethnal Green as Dr Allinson's Natural Food Company. It was the first to produce wholemeal/wholegrain flour. His slogan was Health without Medicine. Allinson was viewed as an eccentric because of his advocation of vegetarianism (in particular of wholegrain bread) and opposition to many medical practices of the time. Two more mills were bought; Queen's Mill in Castleford and one in Newport in Wales.

The company was joined with six others to form Allied Bakeries by Willard Garfield Weston in 1935.

The company has advertised on TV with Brian Glover declaring it's Bread wi' Nowt Taken Out. It gave the impression that Thomas Allinson would have had a Yorkshire accent, but that would not have been the case.

== Production ==
The company is based in Maidenhead in Berkshire, at the same address as ABF. It only makes wholemeal bread. The brand is worth around £20m. It sells two varieties: Wholemeal and Hi-Bran.

== Allinson Flour ==
Allinson Flour is a separate company making flour and yeast, owned by The Silver Spoon Company based in Peterborough.

== See also ==
- Allinson (surname)
- Kingsmill - also made by ABF, makes both white and brown bread (i.e. "Great Everyday" wholemeal loaf)
- List of brand name breads
