= Leslie Large =

English vegetarianism advocate (1864–1896)

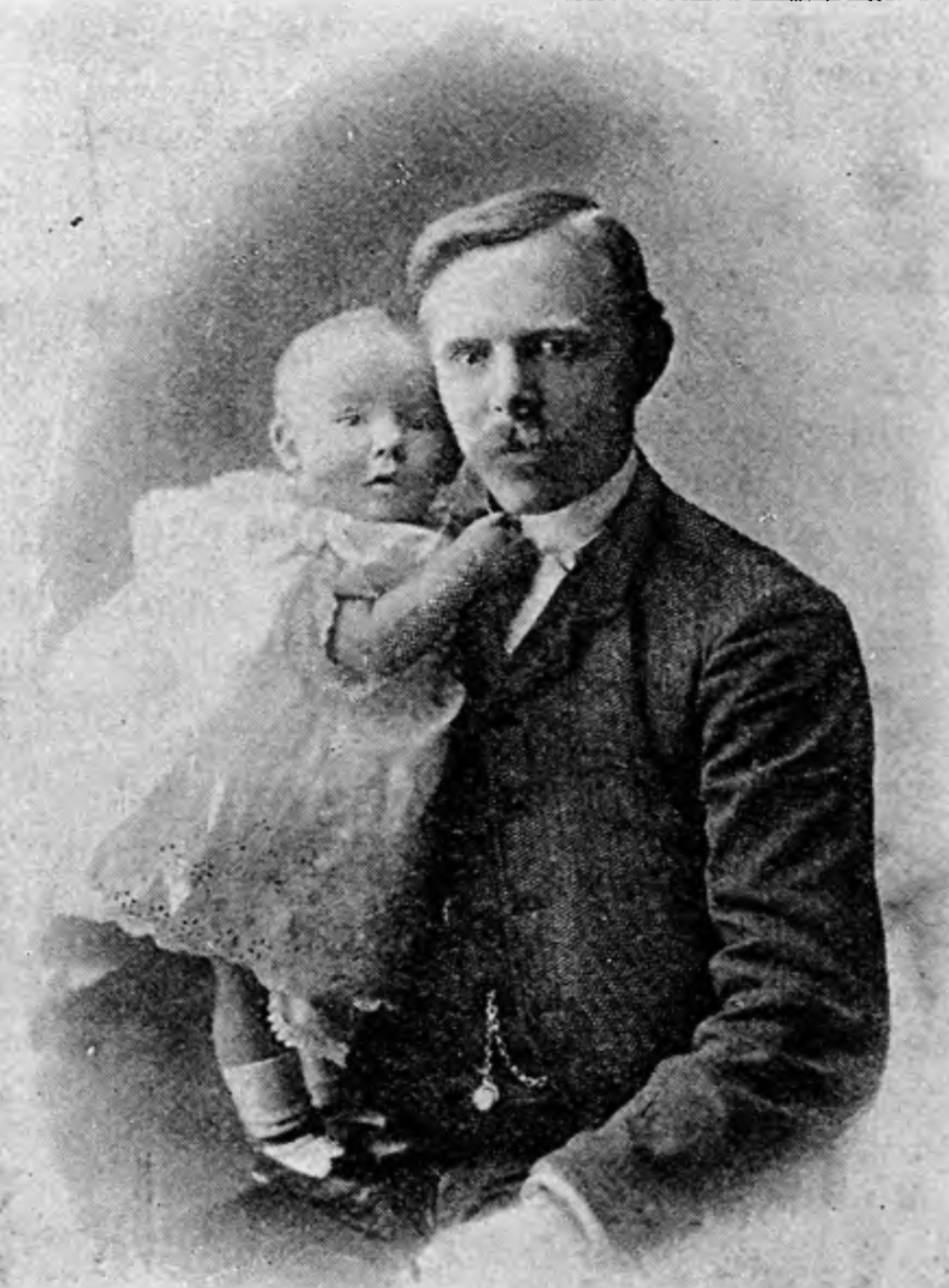
- Large with his first son, c. 1894
- Born: 23 March 1864; Camberwell, Surrey, England
- Died: 14 September 1896 (aged 32); Edinburgh, Scotland
- Occupation: Vegetarianism advocate
- Known for: Founding the Vegetarian Cycling Club
- Spouse: Anna Pashley (m. 1890)
- Children: 3

Signature
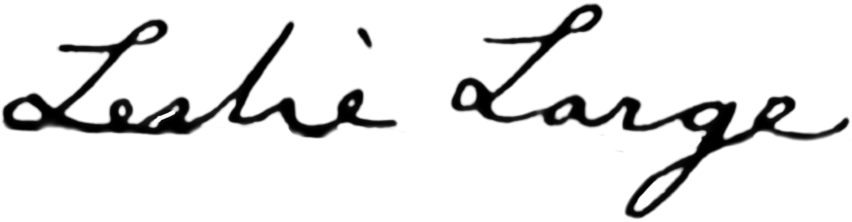

Leslie Large (23 March 1864 – 14 September 1896) was an English vegetarianism advocate. He founded the Vegetarian Cycling Club (later the Vegetarian Cycling and Athletic Club) and the Vegetarian Rambling Club, was honorary secretary of the South East London Vegetarian Society, and served on the executive committee of the National Food Reform Society.

== Biography ==
Large was born on 23 March 1864 in Camberwell, Surrey, to Edward James Large and Elizabeth Large. He became a vegetarian for humanitarian reasons and was active in the vegetarian movement in London. He served on the executive committee of the National Food Reform Society.

In September 1887, Large placed notices in several periodicals inviting other vegetarian cyclists to contact him about forming a club. The Vegetarian Cycling Club (later the Vegetarian Cycling and Athletic Club) held its first formal meeting in London on 9 October 1888. Large was elected its first secretary, and Arnold Hills became its first president.

Large also founded the Vegetarian Rambling Club in 1889 to promote vegetarianism; it later became a social club for members. He served as honorary secretary of the South East London Vegetarian Society. He wrote The True Purpose of Animals, which was first published in The Vegetarian in 1891 and later issued as a pamphlet.

In 1890, he married Anna Pashley at Saint James, Hatcham. They had three sons.

Large died from diphtheria in Edinburgh on 14 September 1896, aged 32, after an illness of about four days. After his death, the Leslie Large Fund was established to furnish a small "Leslie" ward at the Oriolet (Note: Oriolet was the Oriolet Hospital and Convalescent Home, a hospital for sick vegetarians founded by Arnold Hills in 1895.) in his memory.

== Publications ==
- The True Purpose of Animals (1891)

== See also ==
- History of vegetarianism
- Vegetarianism in the Victorian era
- Vegetarianism in the United Kingdom
