= Bertrand P. Allinson =

English physician, naturopath, writer and activist (1891–1975)

Bertrand P. Allinson MRCS LRCP
- Allinson in 1962
- Born: Bertrand Peter Allinson; 12 August 1891; Marylebone, London, England
- Died: 1 April 1975 (aged 83); Marylebone, London, England
- Education: University College Hospital
- Occupations: Physician, naturopath, writer, activist
- Parents: Thomas Allinson (father); Anna Allinson (mother)
- Relatives: Adrian Allinson (brother)

Bertrand Peter Allinson MRCS LRCP (12 August 1891 – 1 April 1975) was an English physician, naturopath and writer. He was also an anti-vaccination, anti-vivisection and vegetarianism activist.

== Life and career ==
Allinson was the son of Thomas Allinson and brother of Adrian Allinson. He was raised as a vegetarian and studied medicine. Allinson qualified MRCS and LRCP in 1914 from the University College Hospital. He was a Captain in the Royal Army Medical Corps (1916–1920). Allinson was a physician at the British Hospital for Mental and Nervous Diseases.

Allinson was an anti-vaccinationist and anti-vivisectionist. He opposed the use of pharmaceutical drugs which he believed hindered the "automatic cleansing process". Allinson wrote articles supportive of naturopathy. He was vice-president of the National Anti-Vaccination League.

Allinson was a physician at the Nature Cure Clinic, a naturopathic hospital which promoted vegetarianism and animal welfare causes such as anti-vivisection. The Nature Cure Clinic opened in 1928 at an apartment in Baker Street. In 1940, the out-patient building was destroyed by bombing and the Clinic moved to Allinson's house in Dorset Square. After the war, the clinic moved to Oldbury Place.

Allinson was treasurer of the London and Provincial Anti-Vivisection Society. His daughter Sonya Madeleine Allinson was an artist.

== Vegetarianism ==
Allinson stated that fruit juice fasting, a strict vegetarian diet and naturopathic practices such as hydrotherapy and osteopathy could be used to prevent and cure many diseases including cancer, hypertension and rheumatism. He opposed the consumption of alcohol, coffee, meat, processed sugar, tea, white bread and promoted a vegetarian diet of raw fruit, nuts, salads, dairy products and whole grains. He described alcohol, coffee and tea as injurious to the functions of the body. Allinson recommended persons between the ages of 25 and 55 to take two meals per day and after that age one meal per day in the afternoon. Allinson was vice-president of East Surrey Vegetarian Society.

Allinson was vice-president of the International Vegetarian Union (1958–1963) and President of the London Vegetarian Society (1922–1962).

== Selected publications ==
- Mice and Men: Part 1, Mice and Men: Part 2 (The Starry Cross, 1922)
- Meat in the Child’s Dietary (The British Medical Journal, 1935)
- The Diet of the Future (Croydon Vegetarian Society, 1942)
- Diet and High Blood Pressure (The Vegetarian Society, 1947)
- Status of Naturopathy (The British Medical Journal, 1951)
- Nature Cure (The British Medical Journal, 1952)
