= Mark Allinson =

British academic

Mark Allinson (born Epping, 1967) is an academic at the University of Bristol, where he is currently associate pro vice-chancellor (learning and teaching). He has previously served as undergraduate dean of arts (faculty undergraduate education director) between 2013 and 2019, head of the School of Modern Languages from 2006 to 2010, and head of the German department between 2003 and 2006.

Allinson studied French and German at the University of Salford, graduating in 1990 when he completed a teacher training course in modern languages at the then Manchester Polytechnic before beginning PhD work on the GDR at University College London under the supervision of Professor Mary Fulbrook. He has lectured in the German Department at the University of Bristol since 1994. He is currently also president of the Bristol Anglo-German Society (BAGS).

Allinson has published a number of books, including Politics and Popular Opinion in East Germany, 1945–68, which, according to WorldCat, is held in 248 libraries and Germany and Austria 1814–2000, which according to WorldCat, is held in 171 libraries. A more recent publication, Germany and Austria Since 1814, offers a clear 200-page English-language outline of German and Austrian history since 1814, apparently designed for non-historians.

He offers a broad variety of undergraduate and postgraduate courses concerned with the recent history of Germany, the collapse of Communism in Europe and contemporary European politics.
