= Cycling in Leeds =

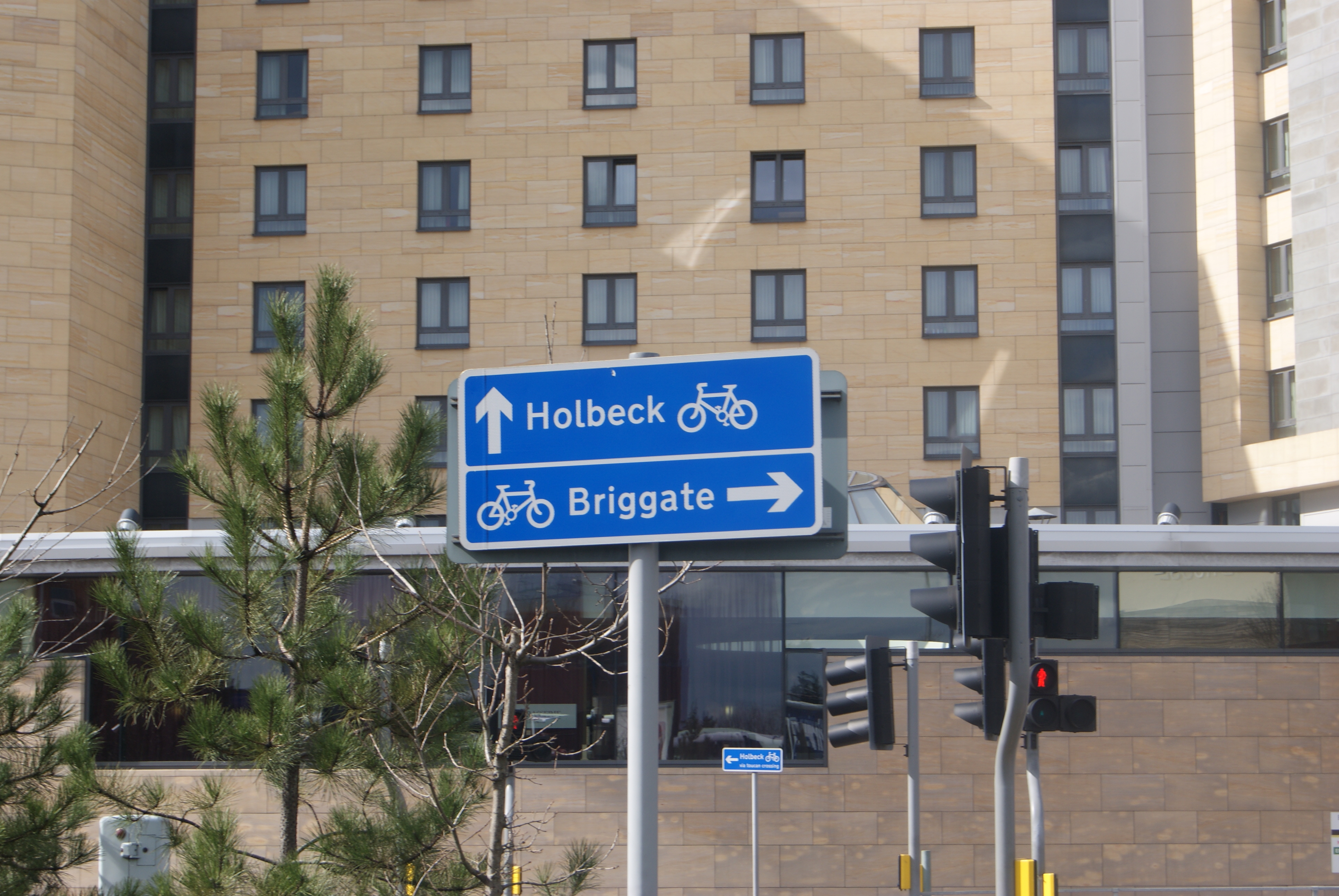
A sign on the Meadow Lane gyratory directing cyclists to the shopping street of Briggate and the district of Holbeck.

Cycling is a popular means of both transport and leisure in the English city of Leeds. 5.9% of residents commute via bicycle. The city hosted a number of cycling events, the most notable being the Grand Départ for the 2014 Tour de France and the Tour de Yorkshire on several occasions.

== Council policy ==
Leeds City Council manages cycling policy within the city and holds four consultancy forums at Civic Hall four times a year in the months of January, April, July and October.

== Utility and commuter cycling ==
A number of commuter cycle routes have been developed into the city centre, while parking for bicycles is provided in several locations around the city centre. A new route is being devised linking Meanwood and Chapeltown with the city centre.

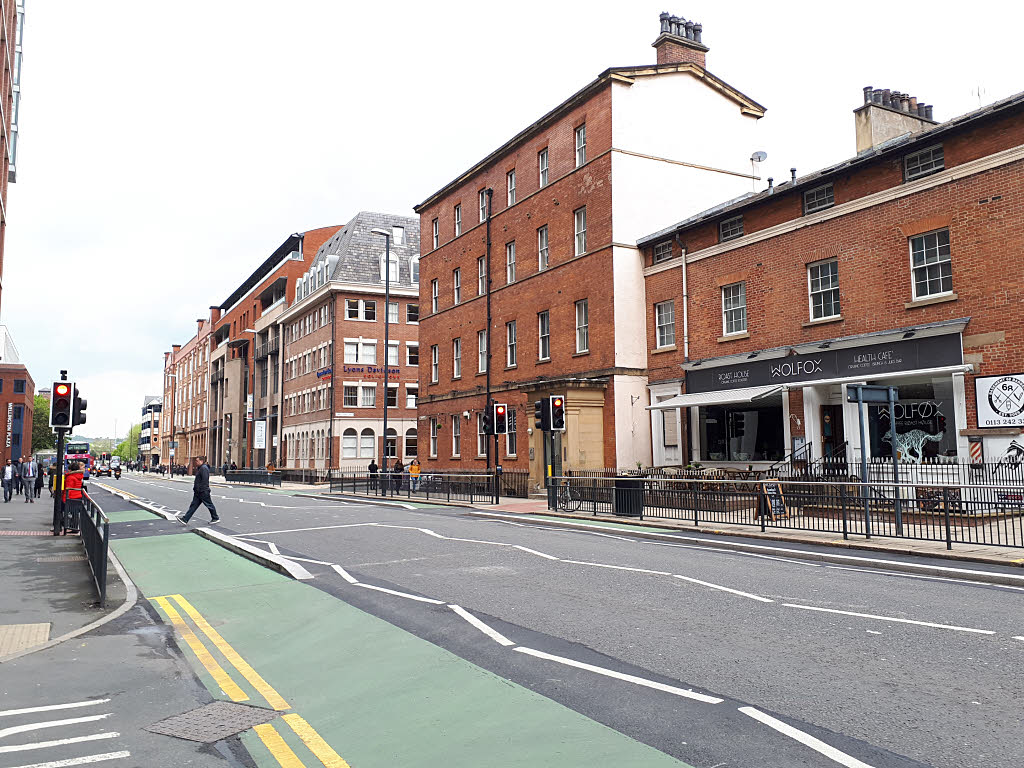
Cycle lane on Wellington Street, Leeds

== Cycle Superhighway ==
West Yorkshire Metro proposed a 23 km cycle superhighway linking the city centres of Leeds and Bradford via Pudsey, with another route between Leeds City Centre and Shipley while both western routes would be linked to an eastern route linking Leeds City Centre with Seacroft, Swarcliffe and Cross Gates using the A64 as its artery. Work began on the scheme in 2015 with the main East-West artery being completed in 2017.

== Leisure cycling ==
There are a number of cycle routes in and around the city aimed at recreational cyclists, such as the Harland Way around Wetherby and the 127 mile long towpath by the Leeds and Liverpool Canal. For BMX cycling there are the Adel Woods Dirt Tracks. There are a number of cycling clubs in the city such as Leeds BMX and Seacroft Wheelers.

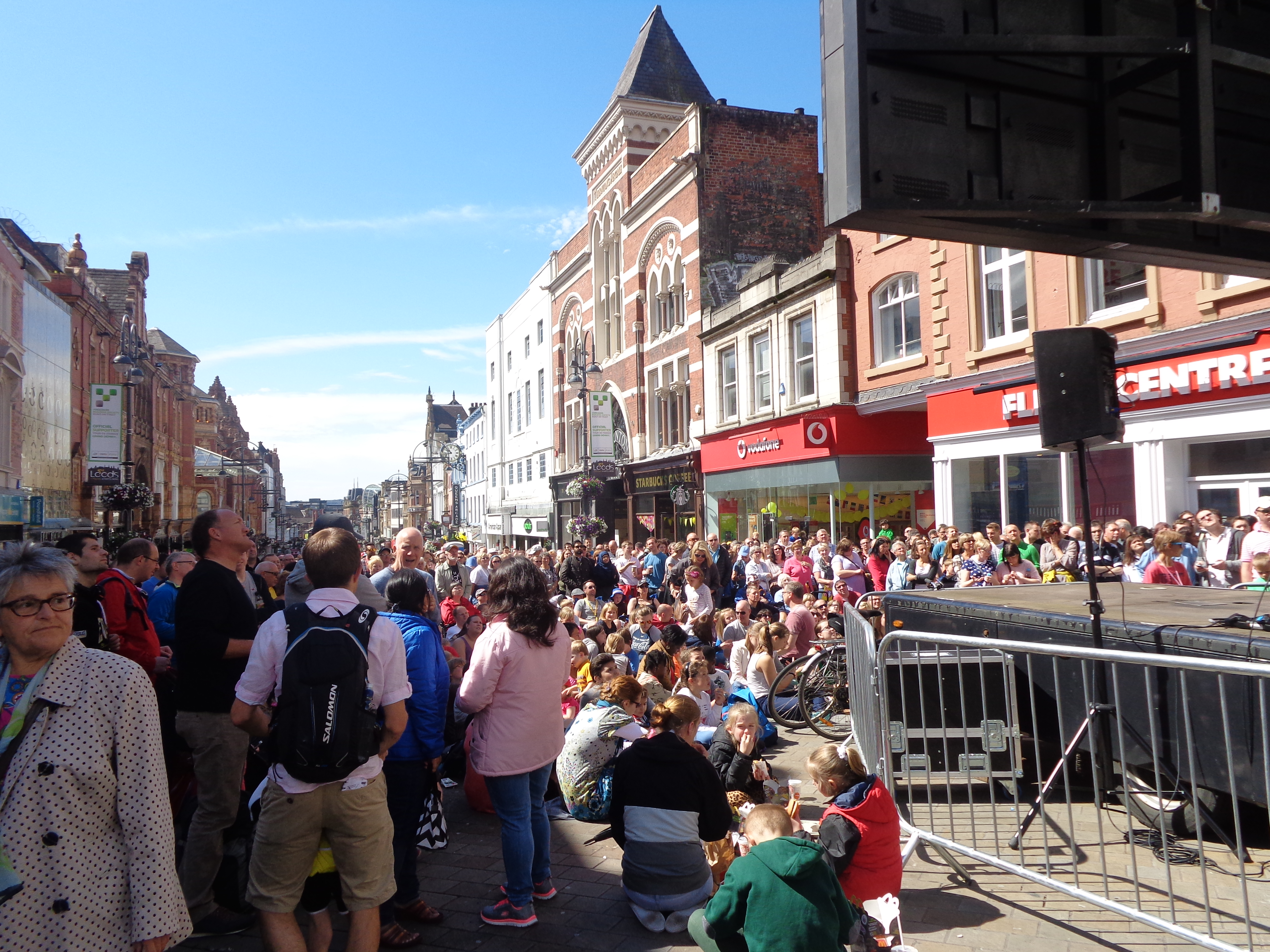
Spectators on Briggate on the day of the Grand Depart.

== Events ==
Leeds hosted the Grand Depart for the 2014 Tour de France, with the depart starting from outside the town hall, with the peloton continuing up to Harewood House where racing began. Other events include the Big Leeds Bike Ride. The city has also hosted the Tour de Yorkshire on multiple occasions.
