= Francesca Allinson =

English polymath (1902–1945)

- Born: Enid Ellen Pulvermacher Allinson; 20 August 1902
- Died: 7 April 1945 (aged 42); Clare, Suffolk, England
- Occupations: Writer, musician, musicologist, puppeteer.
- Notable work: A Childhood (1937)
- Parents: Thomas Allinson (father); Anna Allinson (mother)
- Relatives: Adrian Allinson (brother)

Francesca Allinson (born Enid Ellen Pulvermacher Allinson; 20 August 1902 – 7 April 1945) was an English polymath who participated in the Bloomsbury Group, and is remembered for her contributions as a writer, musician and puppeteer. She was the youngest child of the pioneering physician and wholemeal bread entrepreneur Dr Thomas Allinson, and sister of the artist Adrian Allinson.

== Biography ==
Allinson wrote the semi-autobiographical book A Childhood, which was published by Hogarth Press in 1937.

She was a musician, a puppeteer, a conductor with the London Labour Choral Union, and wrote extensively on the origins of English folk song, clashing with the composer Ralph Vaughan Williams on the subject. She published editions of Henry Purcell and Orlando Gibbons and her unpublished manuscript on the Irish origins of English folksong is held at the Vaughan Williams Memorial Library.

Allinson was a pacifist and established a community farm in East Grinstead, Surrey, where conscientious objectors worked during World War II.

Her circle of friends and collaborators included the composer Alan Bush, artists Enid Marx and Wilfred Franks, music critic John Amis and poet Douglas Newton. She was a close friend of the composer Michael Tippett who dedicated two of his compositions to her, Piano Sonata no.1 (1936–38) and The Heart's Assurance (1950-51); the latter was written in response to Allinson's death. In old age Tippett was asked if he had ever been close to a woman, he replied, "Oh yes. Indeed. All through my life, Francesca Allinson, who I was closer to than almost anybody. It was a strange, tender, extremely tender, gentle relationship."

Through much of the 1930s Allinson was involved in a same-sex relationship with Judith Wogan, a producer of plays and owner of the Grafton Theatre on London's Tottenham Court Road.

Allinson died in 1945 by suicide by drowning in the River Stour in Clare, Suffolk. She left suicide notes for both Tippett and Wogan; the one left for Tippett included the following:

"Darling - it's no good – I can't hold on any longer. One has to be a better and stronger character than me to be able to face a life of individualism... I have thought endlessly about whether it is wrong - and perhaps it is. But one would have to feel very sure about its wrongness to go on existing as a helpless unhelping unit in the terrible post-war years that are to come... If we have to live many lives, may I live near those I now love again and make a better job of living... I can't live without the warm enfolding love of another person - and in this life I have smashed up the chance of that (in my love too). Darling forgive me. I am so tired and have been for so many years. All my love, Fresc."

== Sources ==
- Soden, Oliver (2019). Michael Tippett The Biography. Weidenfeld & Nicolson. ISBN 978-1-4746-0602-8.
- Southworth, Helen (2017). Fresca: a life in the making: a biographer's quest for a forgotten Bloomsbury polymath. Chicago: Sussex Academic Press. ISBN 978-1-84519-821-3.
