= Anna Allinson =

German-British painter and social reformer (c. 1856–1938)

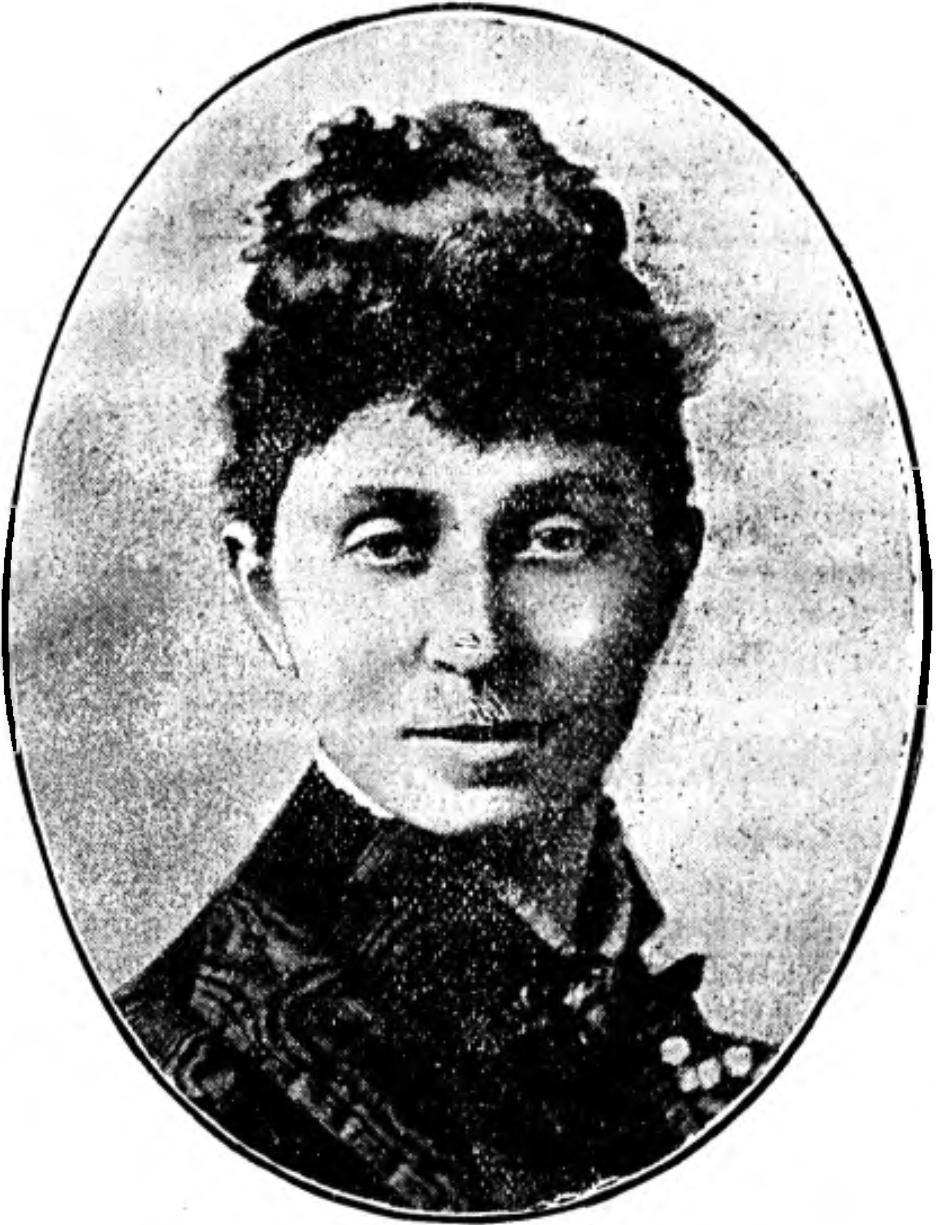
- Allinson, c. 1895
- Born: Anna Pulvermacher c. 1856; Berlin, Kingdom of Prussia
- Died: 10 July 1938 (aged 82); Brondesbury, Middlesex, England
- Resting place: Golders Green Crematorium
- Other name: Anna Pulvermacher Allinson
- Education: Slade School of Fine Art
- Occupations: Painter; social reformer
- Spouse: Thomas Allinson (m. 1888; died 1918)
- Children: 5, including Adrian, Bertrand P., and Francesca
- Relatives: Ernestine Rose (great-aunt)

Anna Pulvermacher Allinson (née Pulvermacher; c. 1856 – 10 July 1938) was a German-born painter and social reformer active in Britain. She trained in Berlin, Paris, and at the Slade School of Fine Art, and painted portraits, still lifes, and figure subjects. Between 1882 and 1888, she exhibited at the Royal Academy, the Walker Art Gallery, the Royal Society of British Artists, the Royal Hibernian Academy, and the Royal Institute of Oil Painters. She was involved in food reform, vegetarianism, animal welfare, anti-vivisection, and women's suffrage. She was married to the physician and food reformer Thomas Allinson and was the mother of the artist Adrian Allinson, the physician Bertrand P. Allinson, and the writer and musician Francesca Allinson.

== Biography ==
=== Early life ===
Allinson was born Anna Pulvermacher in Berlin, then part of the Kingdom of Prussia, around 1856, into a German Jewish family. Her parents were Israel David Pulvermacher (Note: Her father's name is also recorded as Julius David Pulvermacher.) (c. 1819–1884), a furrier, and Jeanette Pulvermacher (née Morgenstern; 1829–1890). She was the great-niece of social reformer Ernestine Rose.

Allinson and her family moved to England in the 1870s.

=== Artistic career ===
Allinson studied painting in Berlin, in Paris, and at the Slade School of Fine Art.

She painted portraits, still lifes, and figure subjects. Between 1882 and 1888, she exhibited at the Royal Academy, the Royal Society of British Artists, the Walker Art Gallery, the Royal Hibernian Academy, and the Royal Institute of Oil Painters.

=== Social reform ===
Allinson became a vegetarian around 1884, initially for health reasons. In an 1895 article, she wrote that her profession as a painter involved sedentary work and that ill health, poor diet, and unventilated rooms had affected her health. She stated that after adopting a non-flesh diet she became "a hygienic Vegetarian", and that her dyspepsia and other symptoms disappeared. She later described the humanitarian argument for vegetarianism as the "noblest" reason for the practice, and said that the humane aspect of the movement had impressed her deeply.

She took part in the food reform movement. She attended meetings connected with the movement and was also involved in animal protection, anti-vivisection, bicycling, music, and women's suffrage.

Allinson served as honorary treasurer and as a vice president of the Women's Vegetarian Union. During disputes within the union, Allinson favoured ending its affiliation with other societies.

=== Personal life and death ===
Allinson met the physician and food reformer Thomas Allinson in 1887. They married on 2 August 1888 in Paddington, Middlesex. They had five children, who were raised with "humane principles": the painter Adrian Allinson (1890–1959); the physician Bertrand P. Allinson (1891–1975); Cyril Allinson (1895–1986); Dulcie Allinson (1898–1898); and the writer and musician Francesca Allinson (1902–1945). Thomas died in 1918.

Allinson died on 10 July 1938 in Brondesbury, Middlesex, aged 82. She was cremated at Golders Green Crematorium on 13 July.

== See also ==
- History of vegetarianism
- Women and animal advocacy
- Women and vegetarianism and veganism advocacy
- Women in the Victorian era
- Vegetarianism in Germany
- Vegetarianism in the United Kingdom
- Vegetarianism in the Victorian era

== Gallery ==
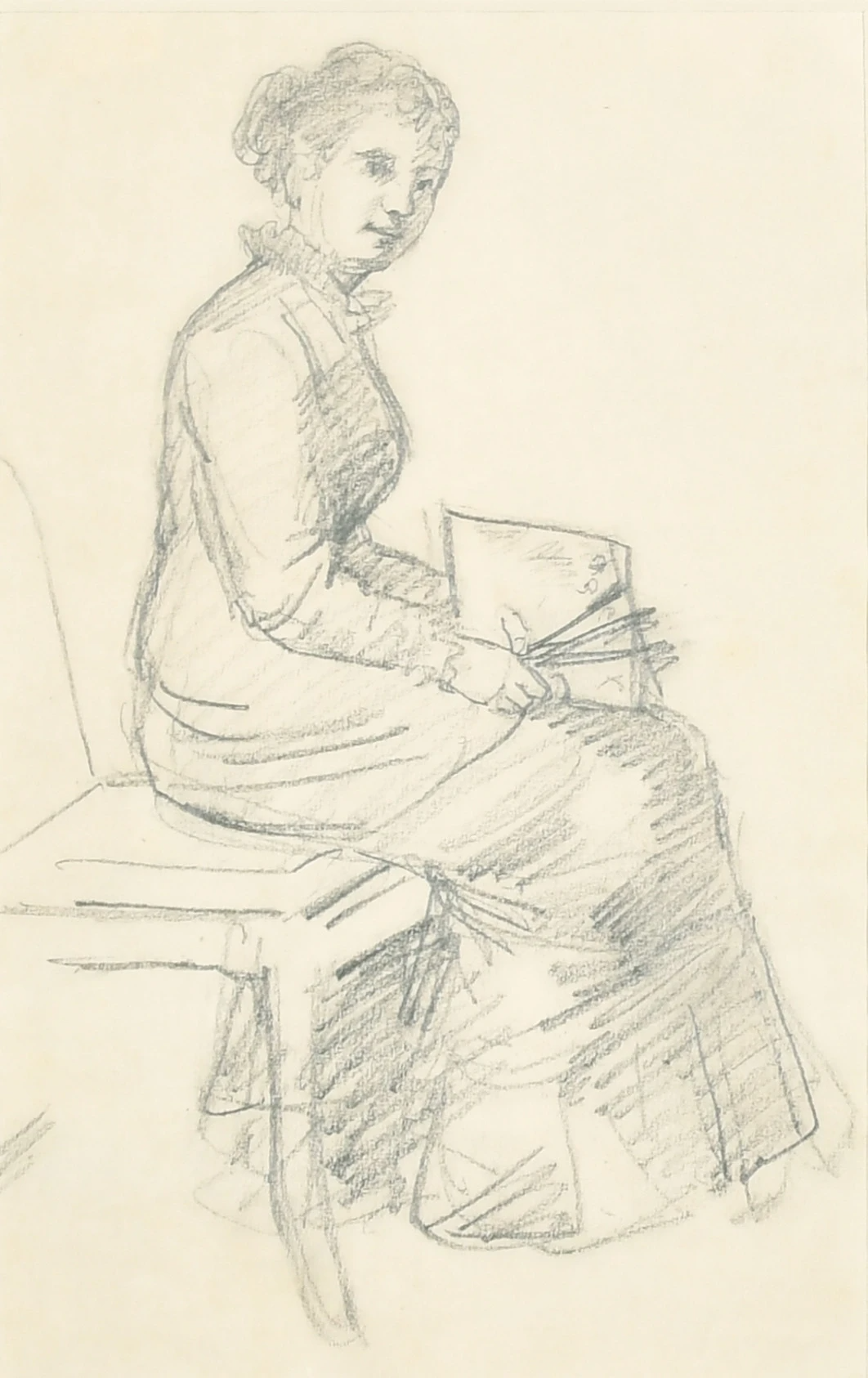
Self-portrait, c. 1879

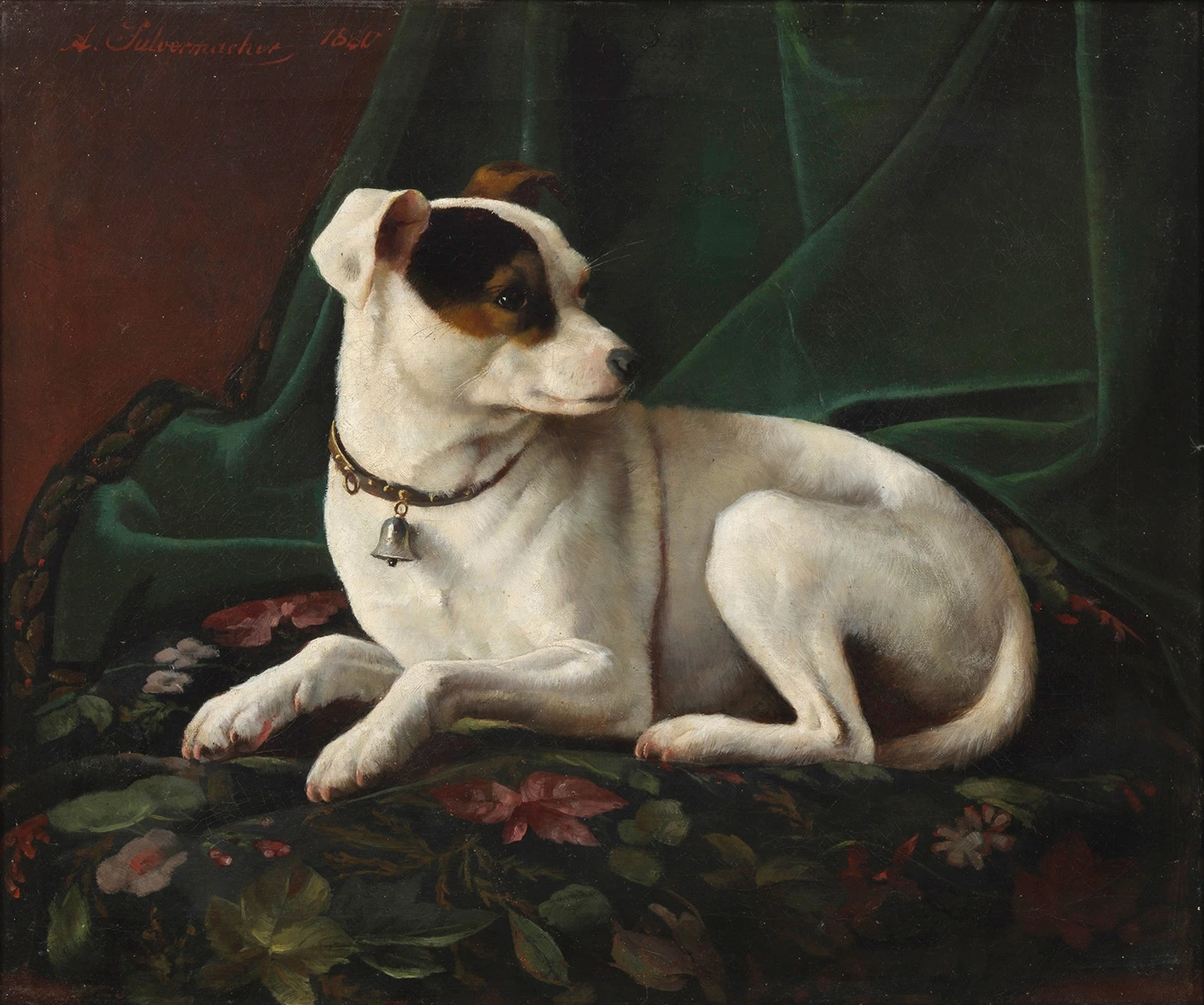
Lying Jack Russell Terrier, 1880

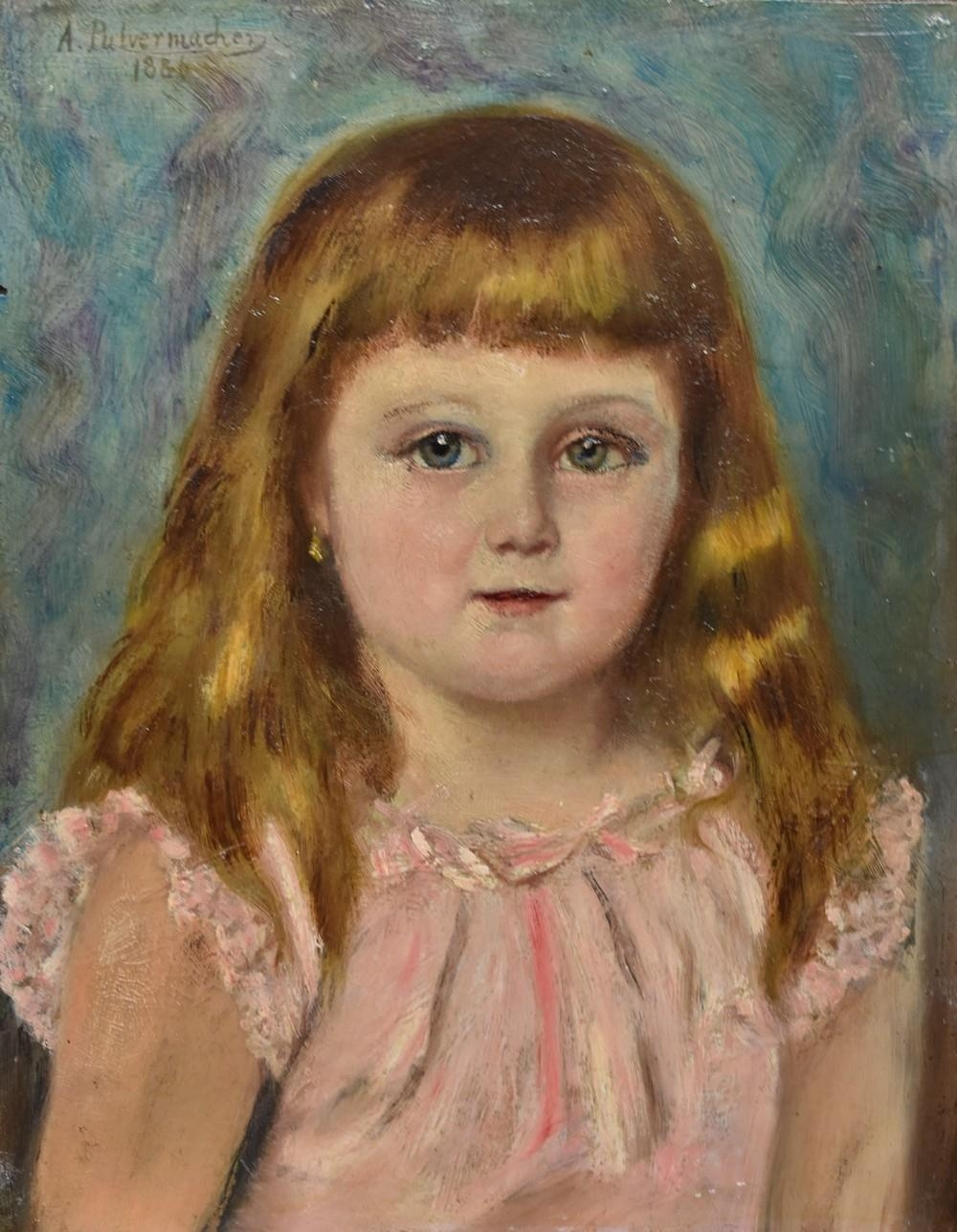
Portrait of a Young Girl, 1881

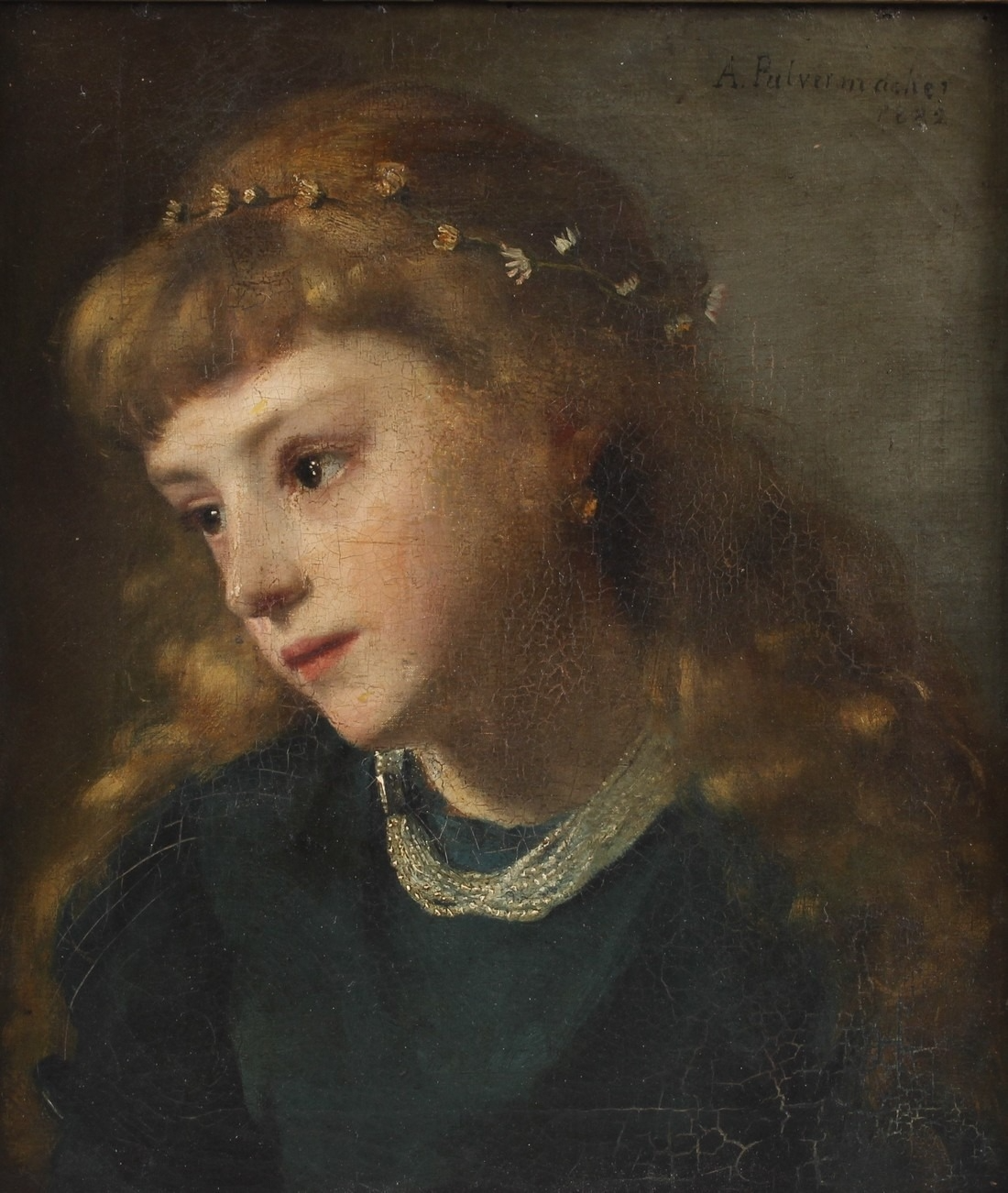
Portrait of a Girl, 1882
