= Castleford Pottery =

English pottery manufacturer

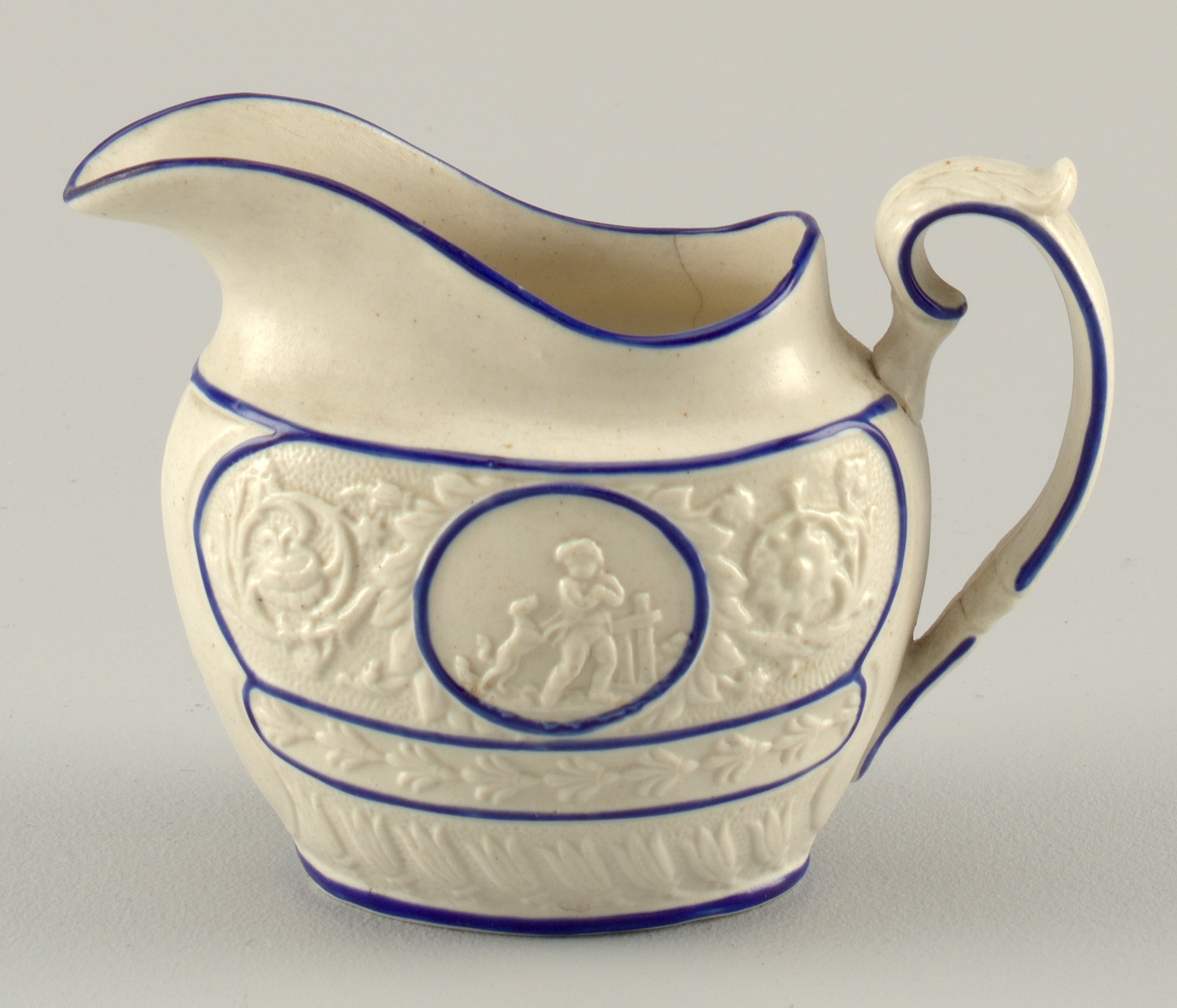
Castleford-type milk jug, c. 1810

The original Castleford Pottery operated from c. 1793 to 1820 in Castleford in Yorkshire, England. It was owned by David Dunderdale, and is especially known for making "a smear-glazed, finely moulded, white stoneware". This included feldspar, giving it a degree of opacity unusual in a stoneware. The designs typically included relief elements, and edges of the main shape and the panels into which the body was divided were often highlighted with blue overglaze enamel. Most pieces were teapots or accompanying milk jugs, sugar bowls and slop bowls (but not cups and saucers), and the shapes often derived from those used in contemporary silversmithing.

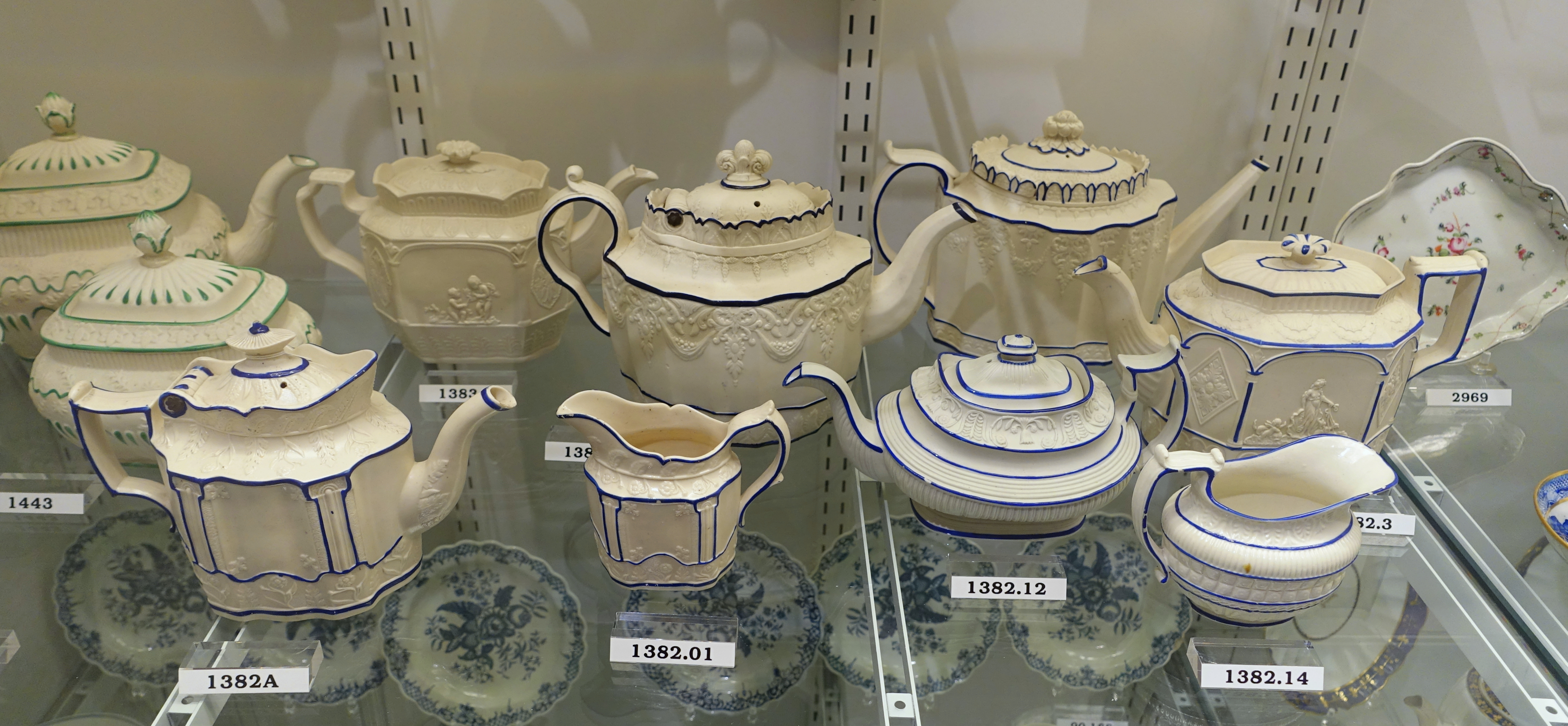
Group of Castleford-type teawares, c. 1805–1815. The pots at near left and middle centre have hinged lids, the one at back right a sliding lid.

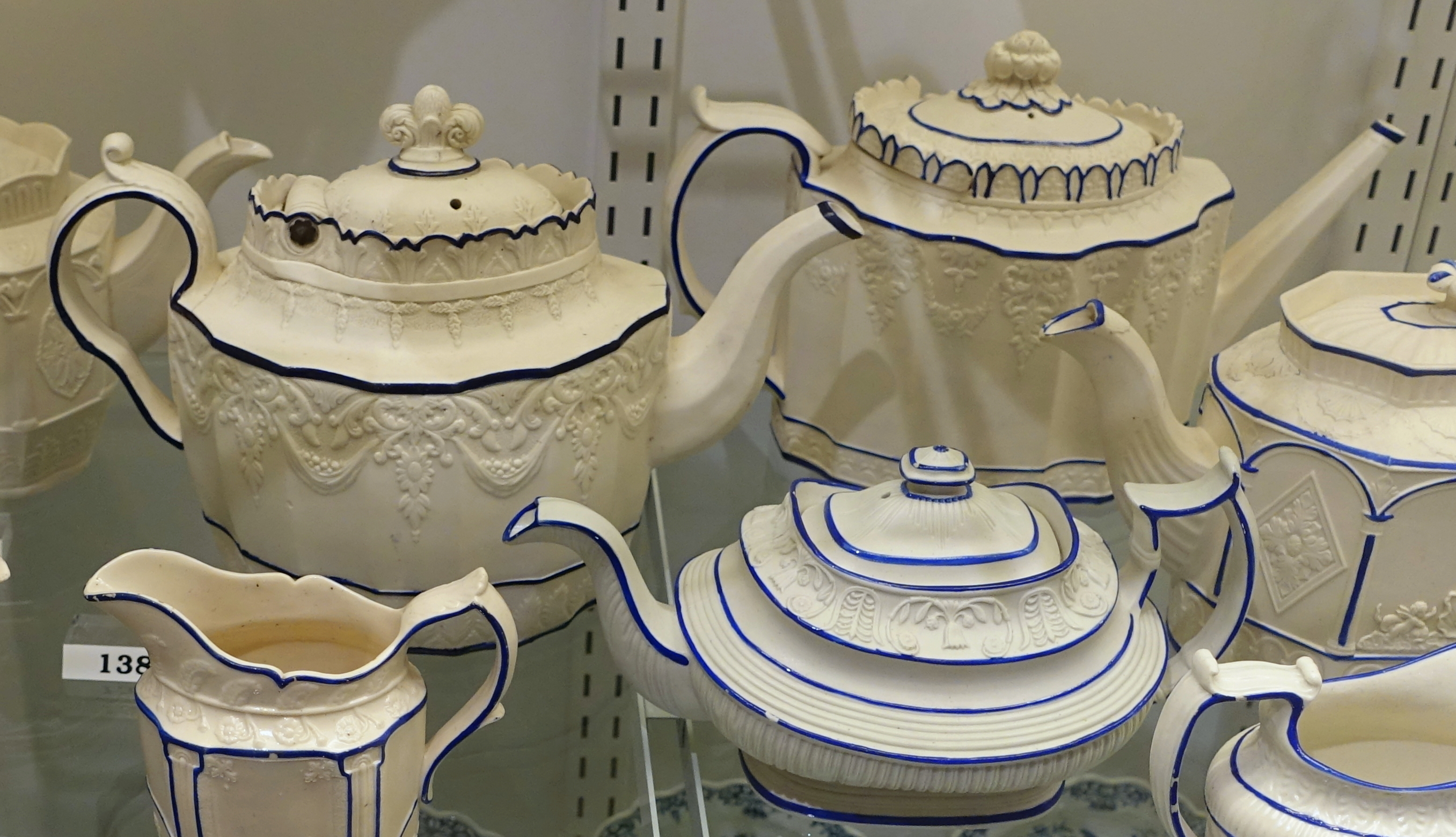
Group of Castleford-type teawares, c. 1805–1815. The teapots at back left has a hinged lid, the one at back right a sliding lid.

This style was used by other potteries, in Yorkshire, Staffordshire, and probably elsewhere, and the tendency in recent decades is to call pieces that are not marked (the great majority) Castleford-type wares. These were made by several potteries in the same period.

The Castleford Pottery depended largely on exports to Europe, especially the Baltic, and apparently owned its own ships. Like other English potteries, the disruption to trade from the Napoleonic Wars was a blow from which it never recovered.

The works, on what is now Pottery Street, Castleford, had been a pottery under previous owners since about 1770, and continued to be so after the sale by Dunderdale in 1820. It is claimed that the same premises operated as a pottery from c. 1770 until the last business, Clokie & Co, closed in 1961. The "Pottery River", an ox-bow branch of the River Calder, gave easy access to barges. The sculptor Henry Moore, who came from Castleford, attended pottery painting classes in the town in the 1920s.

== Castleford-type ==
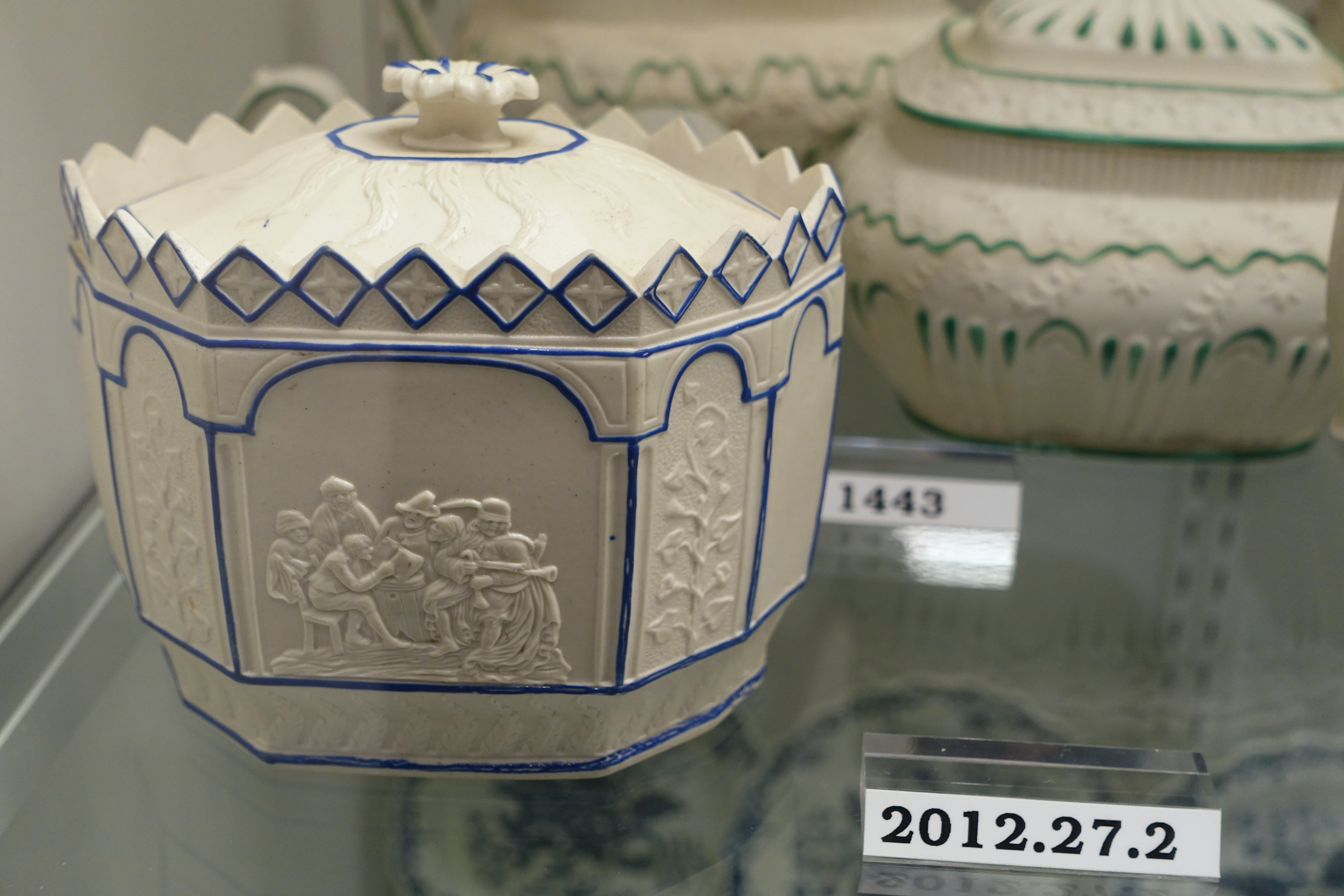
Castleford-type sugar bowl, 1790–1810

The teapots often have a straight-sided octagonal shape, imitating designs in silver. The reliefs follow the general artistic taste of the period, with mild Neoclassicism shading into Romanticism. The lids of the teapots are often either hinged, or slide out to the rear, the lid piece including a section of the "gallery" or border around the top hole in the pot.

Sowter & Co of Mexborough, South Yorkshire, and Chetham & Woolley of Longton, Staffordshire, in The Potteries, were two of the other potteries that made Castleford-type wares. The number "22" is often impressed on the base of otherwise unmarked pots, and this has been associated with Sowter & Co.

"Basalt ware" teapots and other large teaware items are the other main type of object associated with Dunderdale's Castleford Pottery. These, also made elsewhere, are in a similar style (without enamel) and sometimes both types are found from the same moulds. They also made pearlware of good quality, some of which was transfer-printed in ornate designs in the style which was becoming popular after 1800.

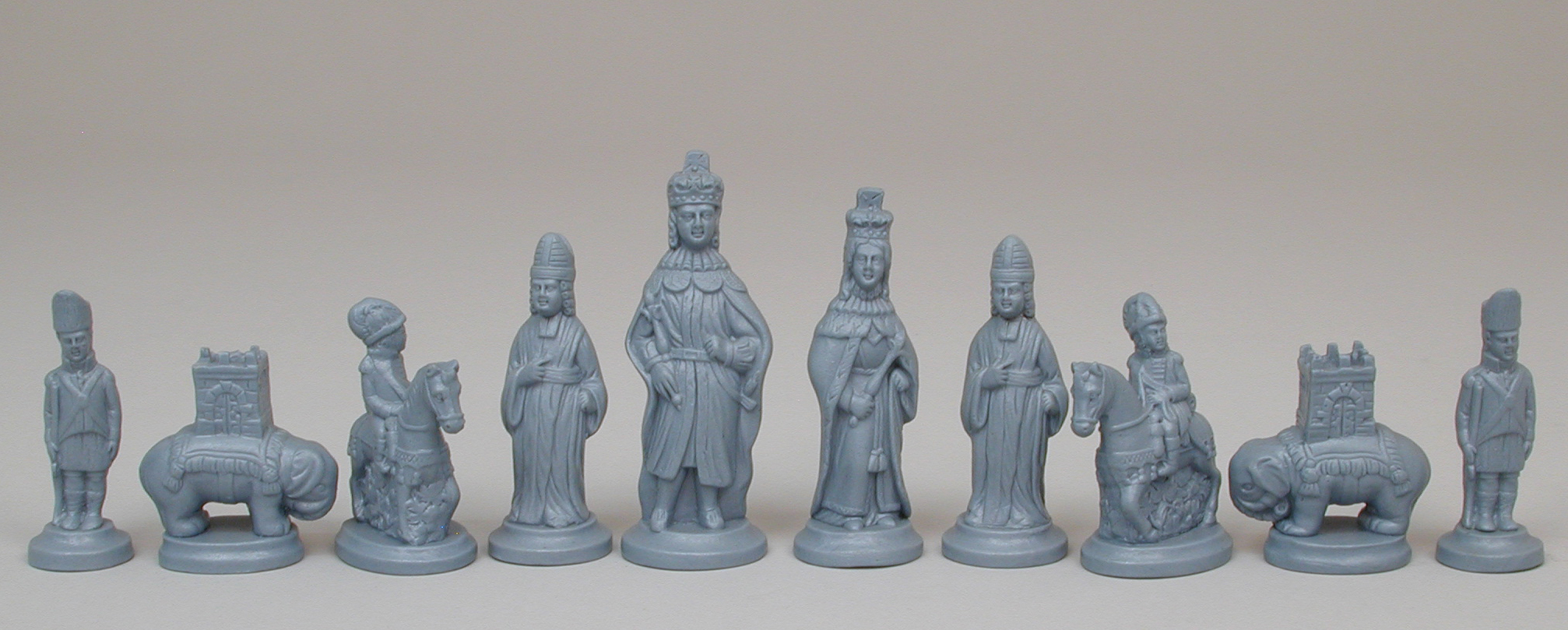
Chessmen, 1800–1810, probably Castleford

Unlike Wedgwood's Jasperware and other types, where the reliefs were made separately and applied, in Castleford-type wares the reliefs were carried in the moulds, into which the clay was pressed, with two mould for the halves of the main body, the handle being joined later.

== Marks ==
Most pieces are unmarked, but some have impressed marks on the base of "DD CASTLEFORD" until 1803, when David Dunderdale took John Plowes as a partner. Thereafter "DD & CO CASTLEFORD" or "DD & CO CASTLEFORD POTTERY" were used.

== Background ==
Although Stoke on Trent in Staffordshire was by this period much the most important pottery centre in England, there were other areas with significant groups of potteries. Yorkshire, with good clay and coal from nearby, had several, most importantly Leeds Pottery; many made stoneware. Teapots and coffee pots, made without the cups needed to serve tea, had always been a staple of British stoneware since the Dutch Elers brothers began British stoneware in around 1690. Starting in London, they moved to Staffordshire and were much imitated in the area. They usually added small relief elements to teapots, but these were generally plant motifs, either Chinese or Western in style.

By about the 1740s Staffordshire potters were making teapots with bolder relief designs, in particular those shaped as camels, in a creamy salt glazed stoneware. These were rather crude in design, but much more refined stonewares, still very often using relief decoration, were produced by Wedgwood from the 1760s onwards, soon followed by their many imitators. In particular Josiah Wedgwood greatly improved the existing black or dark brown stoneware called "Egyptian black", which he renamed "Black Basaltes" when he perfected his version in 1769. This type is now called "black basalt" or "basalt ware". It was also popular for teapots, supposedly because it showed off by contrast the white hands of the hostess as she poured tea. The Castleford Pottery was one of many imitators of basalt wares, which derived their colour from manganese and iron added to the body mixture.

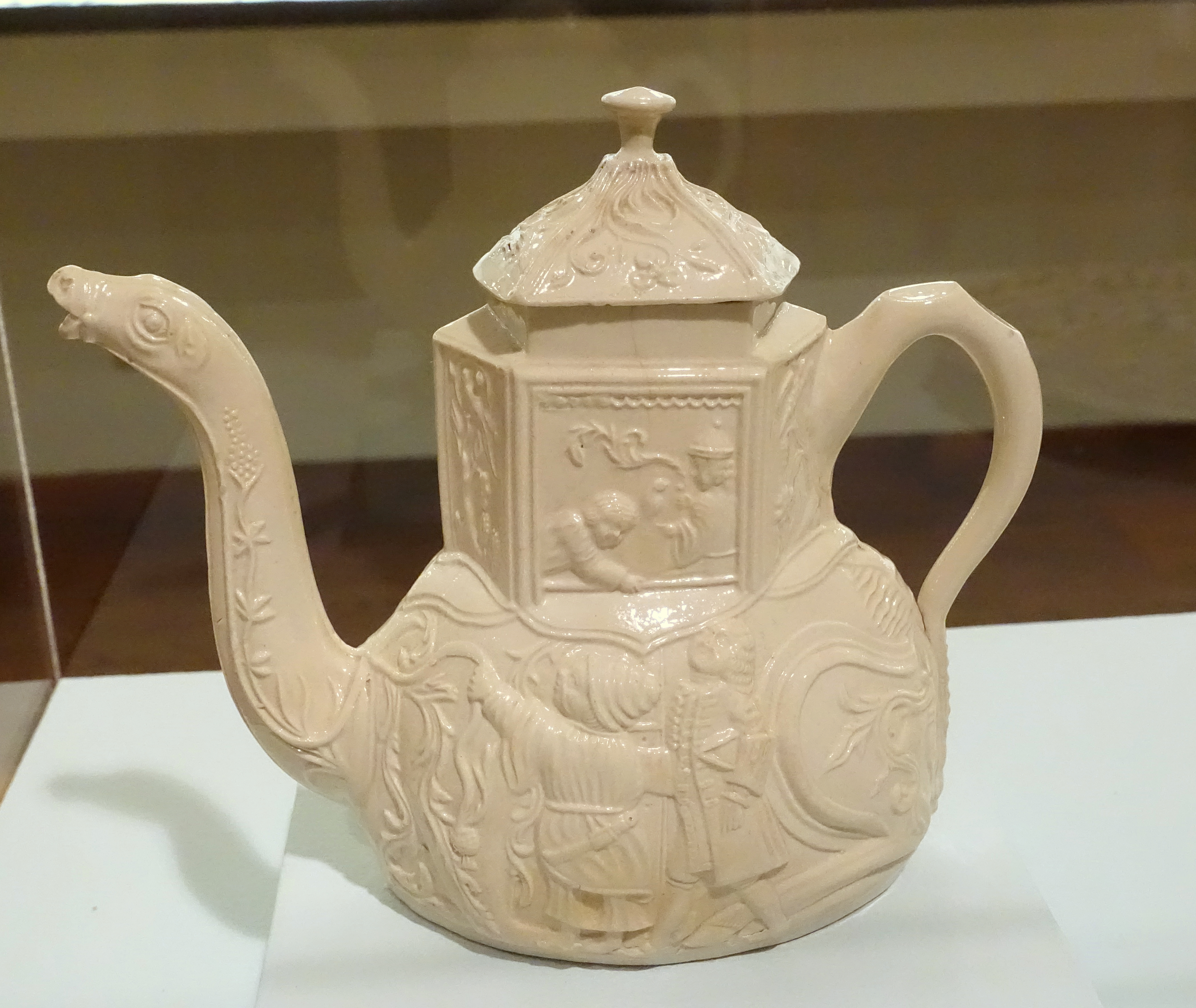
"Camel" stoneware teapot, Staffordshire, c. 1750

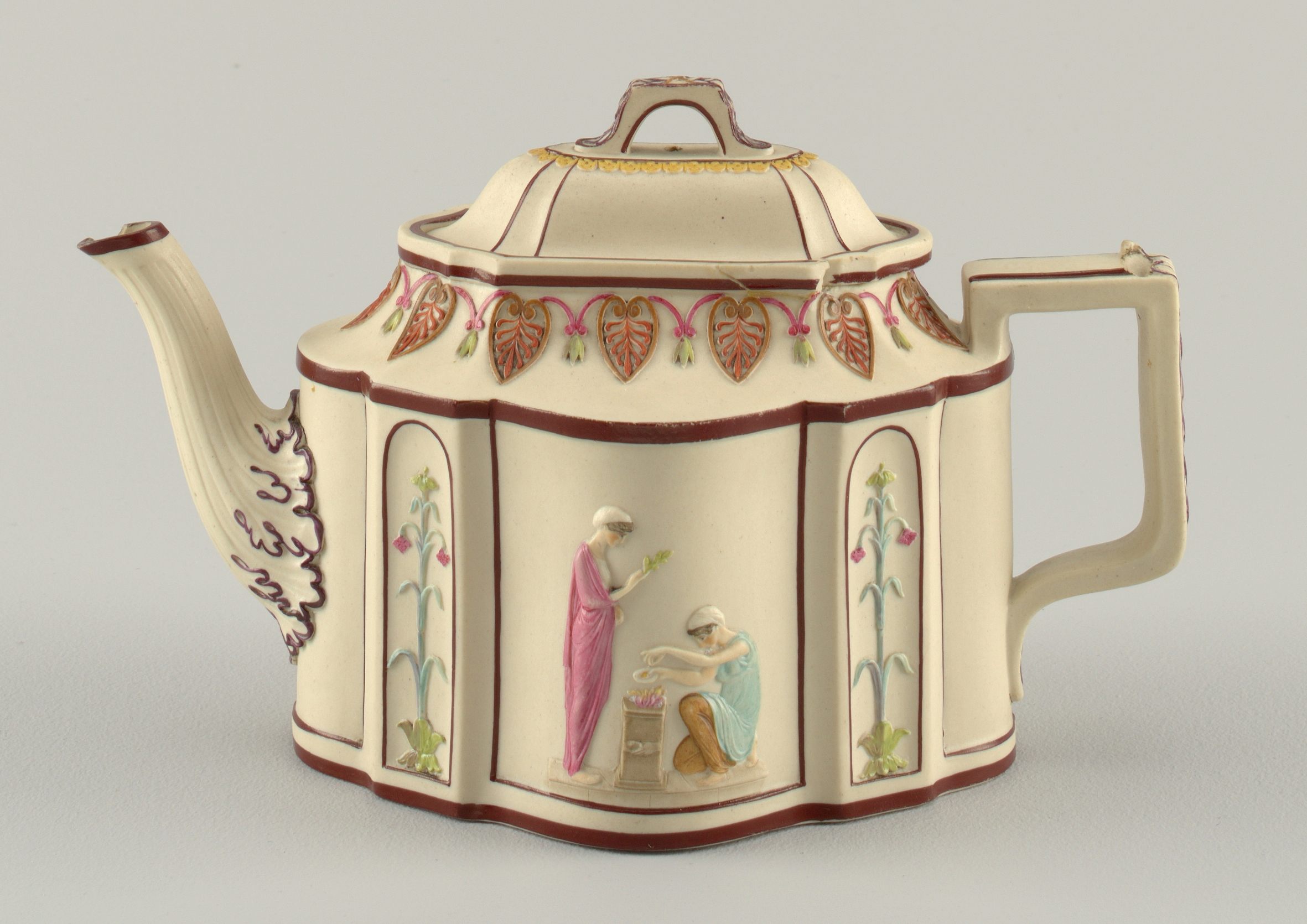
Turner factory, stoneware, c. 1785, antedating the Castleford Pottery

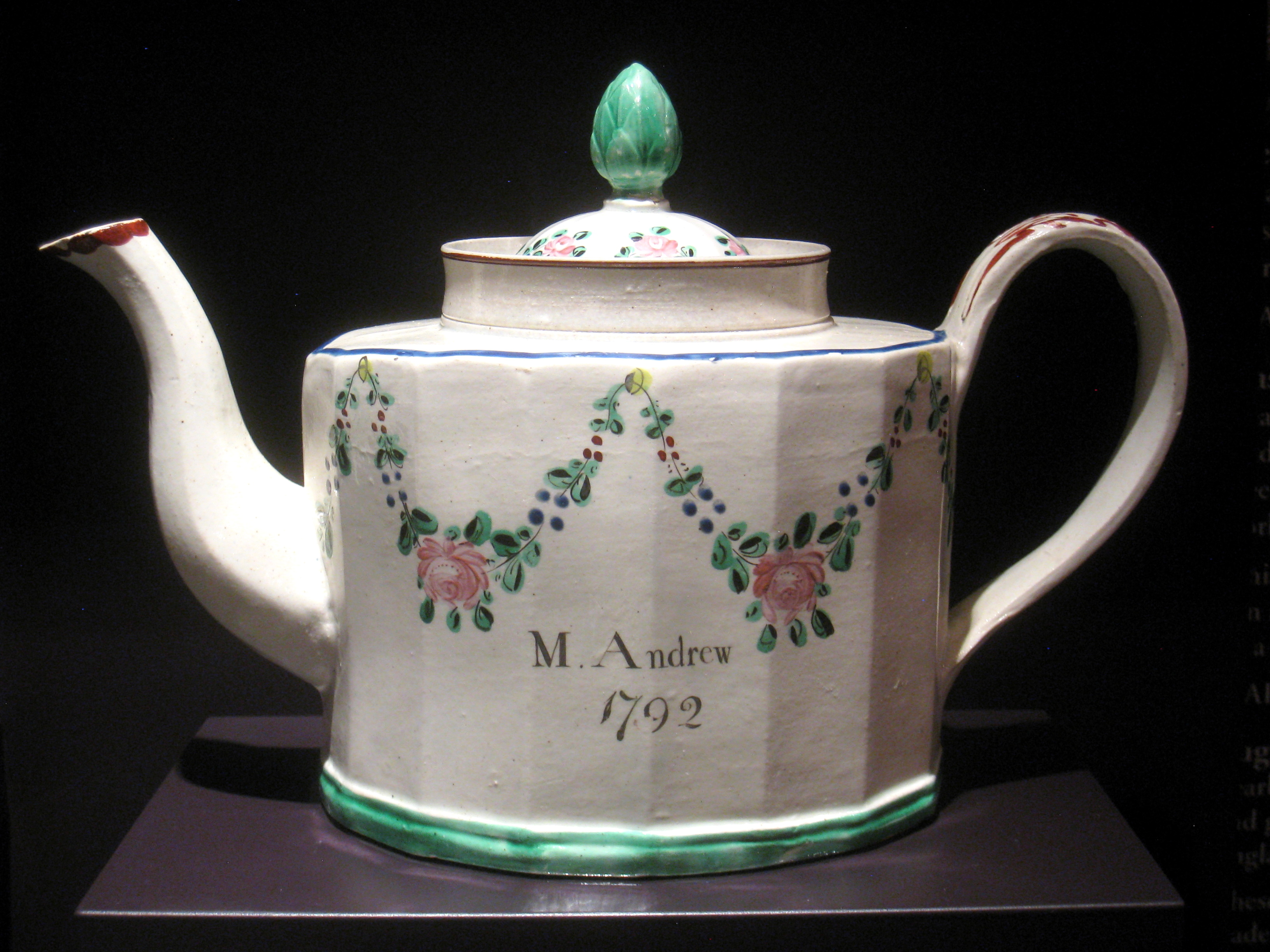
Early Castleford ware commemorative teapot, dated 1792, pearlware

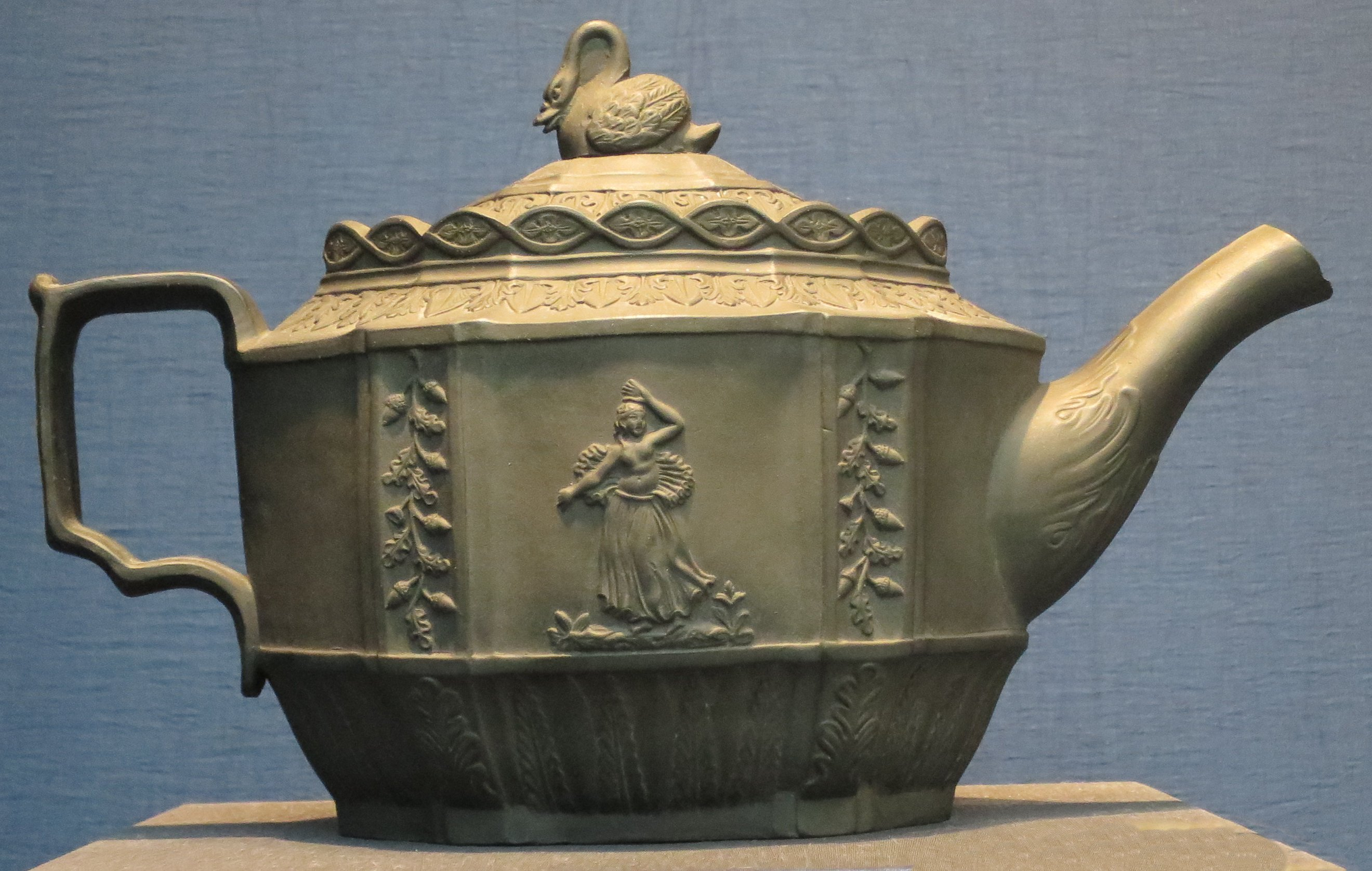
Castleford ware teapot, basalt ware
