= Adrian Allinson =

British artist (1890–1959)

Adrian Allinson ROI
- Born: Adrian Paul Allinson; 9 January 1890; London, England
- Died: 20 February 1959 (aged 69); London, England
- Education: Wycliffe College, Gloucestershire; Slade School of Fine Art
- Known for: Painting, pottery, sculpture, engraving
- Notable work: "The Café Royal" (1915–16), posters for London Transport (1934–40)
- Spouse: Clarke Buckland
- Parents: Thomas Allinson (father); Anna Allinson (mother)
- Relatives: Bertrand P. Allinson (brother) Francesca Allinson (sister)
- Elected: Royal Society of British Artists (1933); Royal Institute of Oil Painters (1936)

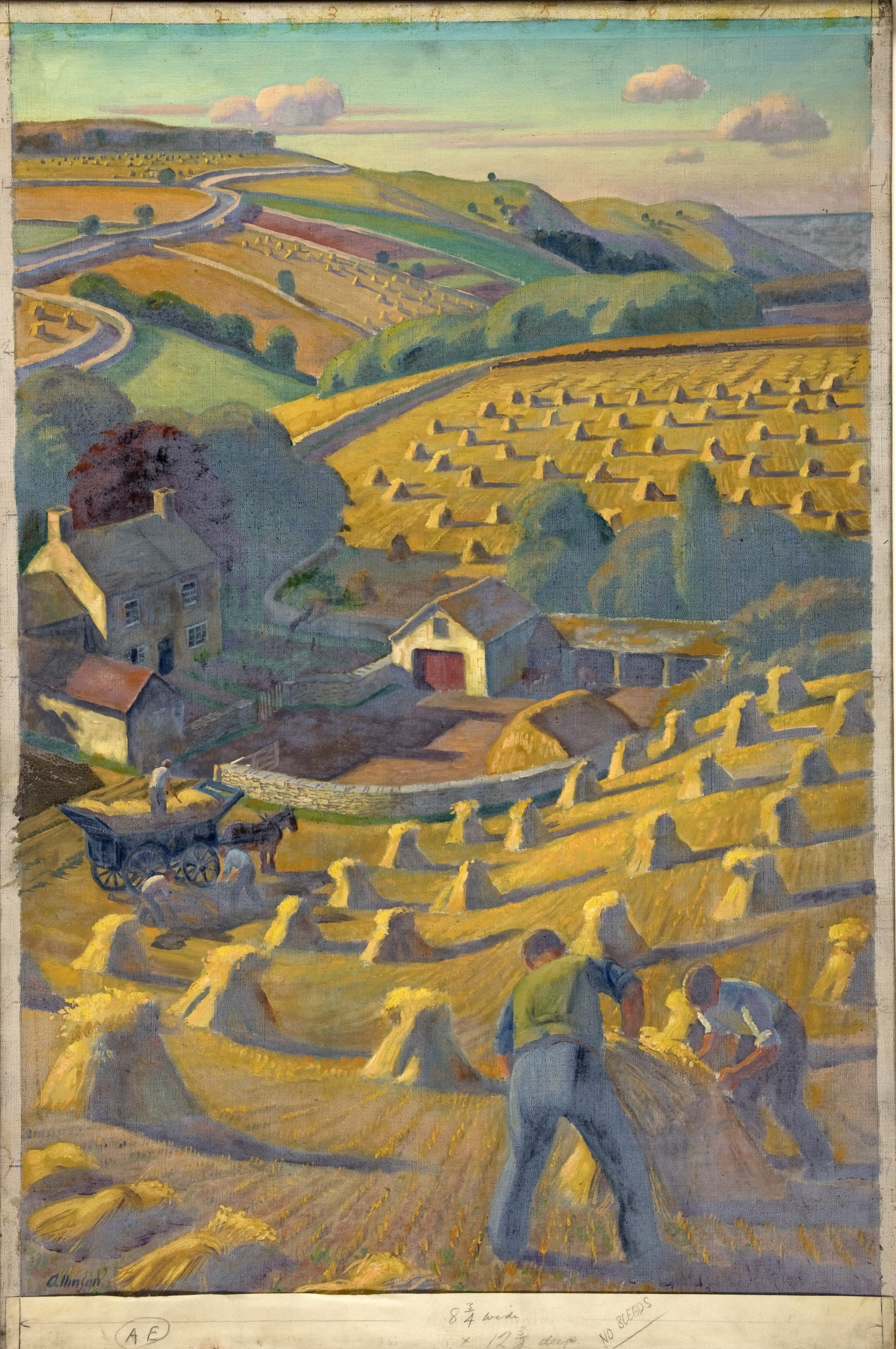
Harvesting, used as part of the "Dig for Victory" campaign during World War II

Adrian Paul Allinson ROI (9 January 1890 – 20 February 1959) was a British painter, potter and engraver known for his landscapes of Southern Europe and North Africa, and for a series of notable posters he made for London Transport.

== Life and career ==
Allinson was born in London, the eldest son of a doctor, Thomas Allinson, whose advocacy of vegetarianism and contraception had led to his being struck off the medical register. His mother Anna Allinson (née Pulvermacher), the granddaughter of a Polish rabbi, was a portrait painter who had studied in Berlin. His brother was physician Bertrand P. Allinson.

After leaving Wycliffe College, Allinson began studying medicine, but gave this up and turned instead to art, gaining a scholarship in his second year at the Slade School of Fine Art. Graduating in 1910, he travelled to Europe to study in Paris and in Munich. Following his first exhibition, at the Alpine Club Gallery, in February 1911, he became one of the founding members of the Camden Town Group, and with other members later joined with the Vorticists to form The London Group.

A pacifist, Allinson associated himself with the Bloomsbury Group during the First World War, producing drawings for the Daily Express newspaper and one of his most important works, a scene inside the Café Royal made in 1915–16. He also designed sets for the Beecham Opera Company. In 1916 he was registered as a conscientious objector.

Following the war he again travelled to Europe. He became a member of the Royal Society of British Artists in 1933 and of the Royal Institute of Oil Painters in 1936. During the 1930s he made a series of posters for London Transport, and for the Empire Marketing Board. He was selected as a government war artist by the War Artists Advisory Committee during World War II. After the war, he taught at the Westminster Technical Institute. Some months before his death, he participated in the creation of a wax sculpture of Kwame Nkrumah for Madame Tussauds.

Allinson died on 20 February 1959.
