= Thomas Allinson =

English physician and dietetic reformer (1858–1918)

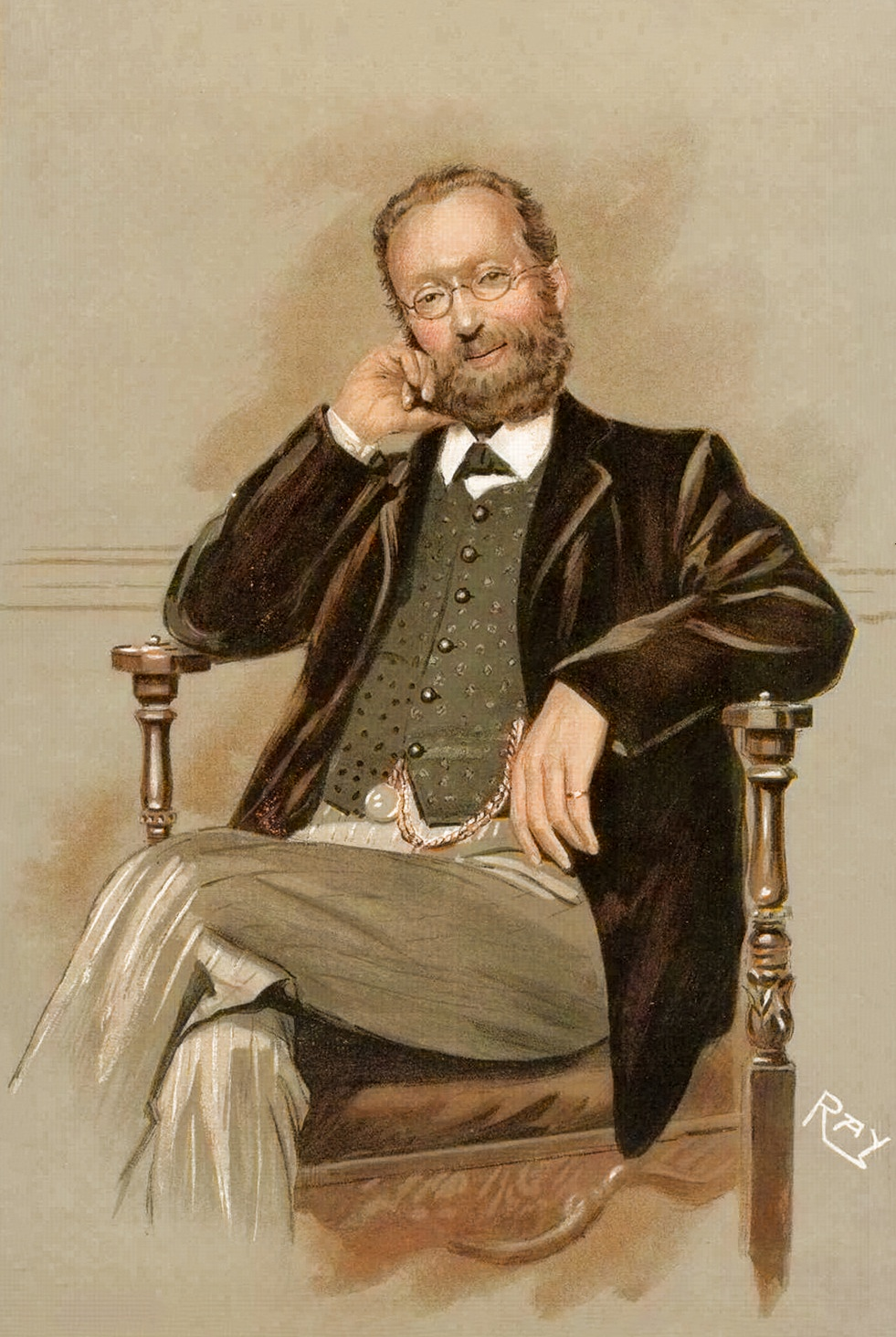
- Born: Thomas Richard Allinson; 29 March 1858; Hulme, England
- Died: 29 November 1918 (aged 60); Marylebone, England
- Occupations: Physician, dietetic reformer
- Spouse: Anna Pulvermacher (m. 1888)
- Children: 4, including Bertrand P., Adrian and Francesca

Thomas Richard Allinson (29 March 1858 – 29 November 1918) was an English physician, dietetic reformer, businessman, journalist and vegetarianism activist. He was a proponent of wholemeal (whole grain) bread consumption. His name is still used today for a bread popular in Europe, Allinson bread.

== Career ==
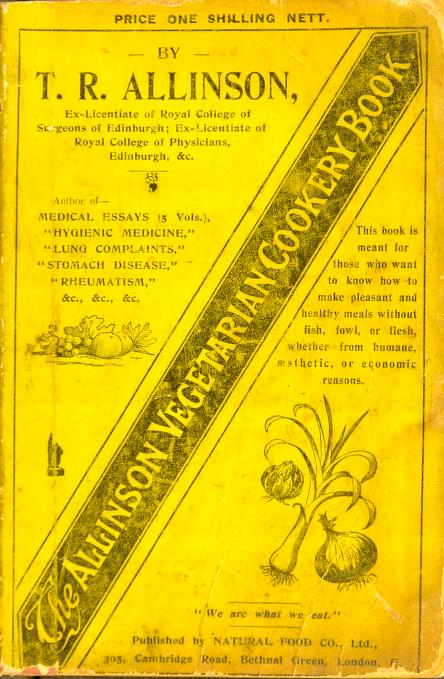
Dr. Allinson's Vegetarian Cookery, 1910

Allinson was born in the Hulme district of Manchester on 29 March 1858. He went to school in Lancaster and Manchester and at fifteen began work as a chemist's assistant. With money he saved and financial help from his stepfather, he was able to attend the extramural medical school in Edinburgh, which was less expensive than the University medical school. He graduated as a Licenciate of the Royal College of Physicians of Edinburgh (LRCP, LRCS) in 1879. After assistantships in Hull and the East End of London he established his own practice in Marylebone in 1885.

In 1888, Allinson married Anna Pulvermacher, an artist who exhibited at the Royal Academy; they had one daughter and three sons, including Bertrand P. Allinson and Adrian Allinson.

Allinson was a vegetarian. He noted that vegetarians do not eat fish, commenting "the vegetarian draws a line at all things that have had life, and does not use them. As butter, cheese, eggs, and milk are not obtained by the slaughter of animals he uses them".

His views often brought him into conflict with the Royal College of Physicians of Edinburgh and the General Medical Council, particularly his opposition to doctors' frequent use of toxic drugs, his opposition to vaccination and his self-promotion in the press. In 1892 he was struck off the Medical Register.

In 1892, he founded the Natural Food Company with the intention of producing and selling healthy foods; he bought a stone grinding flour mill in Bethnal Green, and a bakery was established shortly afterwards. In 1911, Allinson bought the failing magazine Vanity Fair from Frank Harris. He failed to revive its fortunes and, in 1914, Vanity Fair merged with Hearth and Home.

During World War I, the food value of wholemeal bread was recognised. Although it has been claimed that Allinson was offered the right to re-register during WW1, the General Medical Council has no record of this and by that time he had no registrable qualifications. His company flourished from the increased demand for whole-grain bread and meal. After his death, the company grew: two more stone-grinding mills were purchased in Newport, Monmouthshire and in 1921 Castleford, Yorkshire. The mills stand to this day.

Allinson died from tuberculosis, at his home in Marylebone, on 29 November 1918.

== Hygienic Medicine ==
During the 1880s Allinson developed his theory of medicine, which he called Hygienic Medicine. In place of orthodox medicine, he promoted health through diet, exercise, fresh air and bathing. He advocated a vegetarian diet and the avoidance of alcohol, tobacco, coffee and tea. He especially promoted the benefits of stone-ground wholemeal breads. He opposed the use of drugs by doctors, many of which at that time were ineffective and toxic and was a lifelong opponent of compulsory vaccination against smallpox. This approach became known as Allinsonian Medicine. He became medical editor of the Weekly Times and Echo in 1885, for which he wrote over 1000 articles during his life, as well as answering readers' medical queries.

He wrote a number of books and pamphlets directed at a general rather than medical readership, including A System of Hygienic Medicine (1886), How to avoid Vaccination (1888), The Advantage of Wholemeal Bread, Medical Essays and A Book for Married Women (1894) and books on stomach diseases, consumption (tuberculosis), rheumatism, vegetarian cooking and healthy diet. He gave frequent public lectures throughout the country propounding his ideas. In one of his books, The Advantages of Wholemeal Bread (1889), he proposed that wholemeal bread was healthier than white (or refined) bread. He believed that smoking was a cause of cancer, which was a radical idea at the time. Allinson regularly sought publicity for his theories and practices in the press and directed his energies not just towards his colleagues but directly to the public. To demonstrate the suitability of a vegetarian diet for strenuous exercise, he undertook a walk from Edinburgh to London in 1891. He walked for 15 consecutive days, averaging 28.5 miles (45.9 km) a day, arriving in London on Saturday, September 12.

== Views on birth control ==
Allinson was expelled from the Vegetarian Society because of his views on birth control. Mahatma Gandhi, who was studying law in Britain at the time and was also a member of the Vegetarian Society, spoke in favour of Allinson's right to support contraception, despite being opposed to it.

In 1893, Allinson sued the Vegetarian newspaper for alleged libel as an article had been published with a comment that his theories encouraged sexual immorality. The jury decided that it was a fair comment and the action was dismissed with costs.

His Book for Married Women advocated equality of women and men, the right of a woman to choose the size of her family, and birth control. For this he was prosecuted and convicted under the Obscene Publications Act in 1901.

== Legacy ==
Allinson's original bread recipe (100% whole grain flour, no fat, less yeast, more water) is still used today, though some lovers of Allinson bread report that it's not as hearty nowadays as it used to be. The advertising slogan for the brand since the 1980s is "Bread wi' nowt [with nothing] taken out".

== Selected publications ==
- Medical Essays (5 volumes, 1892)
- Dr. Allinson's Vegetarian Cookery (1910)
