= Alice Pinches =

English vegetarianism activist (1865–1908)

- Born: 1865; Marylebone, Middlesex, England
- Died: 2 February 1908 (aged 42); Kilburn, London, England
- Occupation: Vegetarianism activist
- Organization: Women's Vegetarian Union
- Relatives: Theophilus Pinches (brother)

Alice Pinches (1865 – 2 February 1908) was an English vegetarianism activist associated with the Women's Vegetarian Union. She became a vegetarian around 1883, and served as the Union's honorary reporter and as a member of its committee. She also contributed to the vegetarian press, conducting the "For Ladies" section of The Vegetarian Messenger in 1898.

== Biography ==
=== Early life ===
Pinches was born in Marylebone, Middlesex, in the final quarter of 1865. Her parents were Theophilus Pinches, a die seal engraver from Birmingham, and Emma Pinches. She was the sister of the Assyriologist Theophilus Pinches.

=== Vegetarianism activism ===
Pinches became a vegetarian around 1883 and later lived at 36 Heath Street, Hampstead.

In May 1894, The Dietetic Reformer and Vegetarian Messenger referred to a letter on vegetarianism by Pinches that had appeared in the Hereford Times. She subsequently became involved with the Women's Vegetarian Union, which had been established in London in 1895. The Union's 1897 annual report listed her as its honorary reporter and as a member of its committee, alongside figures including Anna Allinson, Adrienne Veigelé and May Yates.

In 1898, Pinches conducted the "For Ladies" section of The Vegetarian Messenger. The periodical had begun publishing a "For the Ladies" section in 1896, initially conducted by C. A. Eccles and Ruth Sharp; the Vegetarian Messenger described its provision for women and children as an attempt to address their "special needs".

=== Death ===
Following a short illness, Pinches died in Kilburn, on 2 February 1908, aged 42.

== See also ==
- History of vegetarianism
- Vegetarianism in the Victorian era
- Vegetarianism in the United Kingdom
- Women and vegetarianism and veganism advocacy
