= Adrienne Veigele =

French teacher and activist (1862–1915)

- Adrienne Veigelé
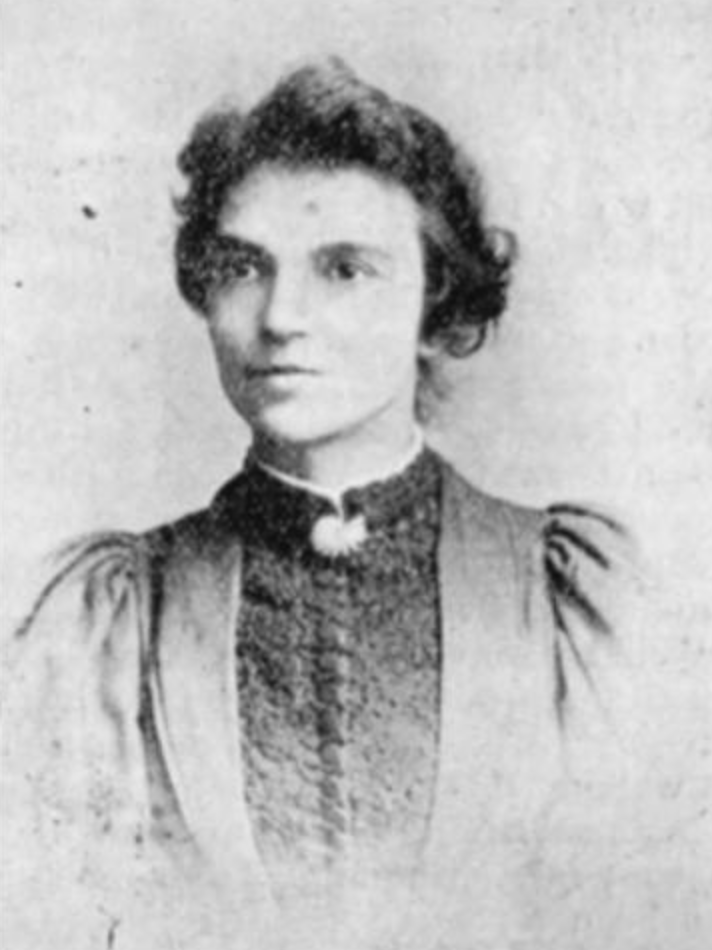
- Veigele in 1895
- Born: October 1862; Paris, France
- Died: 31 May 1915 (aged 53); Crowthorne, England
- Citizenship: French; British
- Occupations: Teacher; activist
- Known for: Women's rights and vegetarianism activism
- Mother: Alexandrine Veigele

Signature
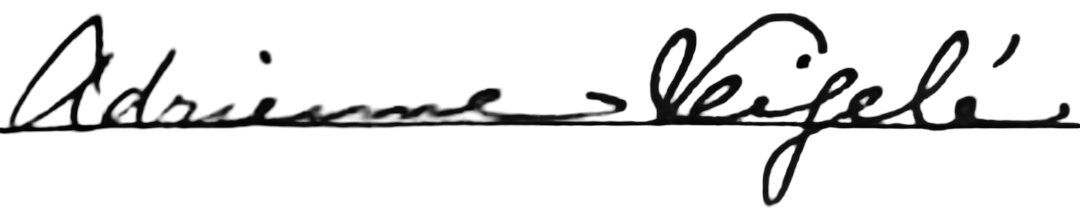

Adrienne Veigele (French: Adrienne Veigelé; (Note: French pronunciation: [vɛ.ʒ(ə).le] VEZH-uh-LAY) October 1862 – c. 31 May 1915) was a French-born teacher and activist for women's rights and vegetarianism who later became a naturalised British citizen. The daughter of Alexandrine Veigele, she moved with her family to London in childhood and worked as a teacher of French and music.

Veigele held posts in the Women's Vegetarian Union, served on the editorial and executive committees of the Vegetarian Federal Union, and contributed to the feminist periodical Shafts. In 1896 she founded the Women's International Progressive Union. She later helped establish vegetarian organisations abroad, including the Société Belge pour l'étude de la réforme alimentaire in Brussels in 1897 and the Dublin Society for the Study of Food Reform in 1899. She died by suicide in 1915 after years of illness and financial hardship.

== Early life ==
Veigele was born in Paris around 1862 to John and Alexandrine Veigele. She moved with her family to London in 1866, when she was five. Her mother adopted a vegetarian diet in 1888 and became active in the vegetarian movement and women's rights.

== Career ==
=== Teaching and writing ===
Veigele taught French and music to support herself and her mother. From February 1894 she advertised tuition in the feminist magazine Shafts. In 1898 she contributed an article to the magazine titled "Qualities admired by Men in Women and by Women in Men".

=== Women's Vegetarian Union ===
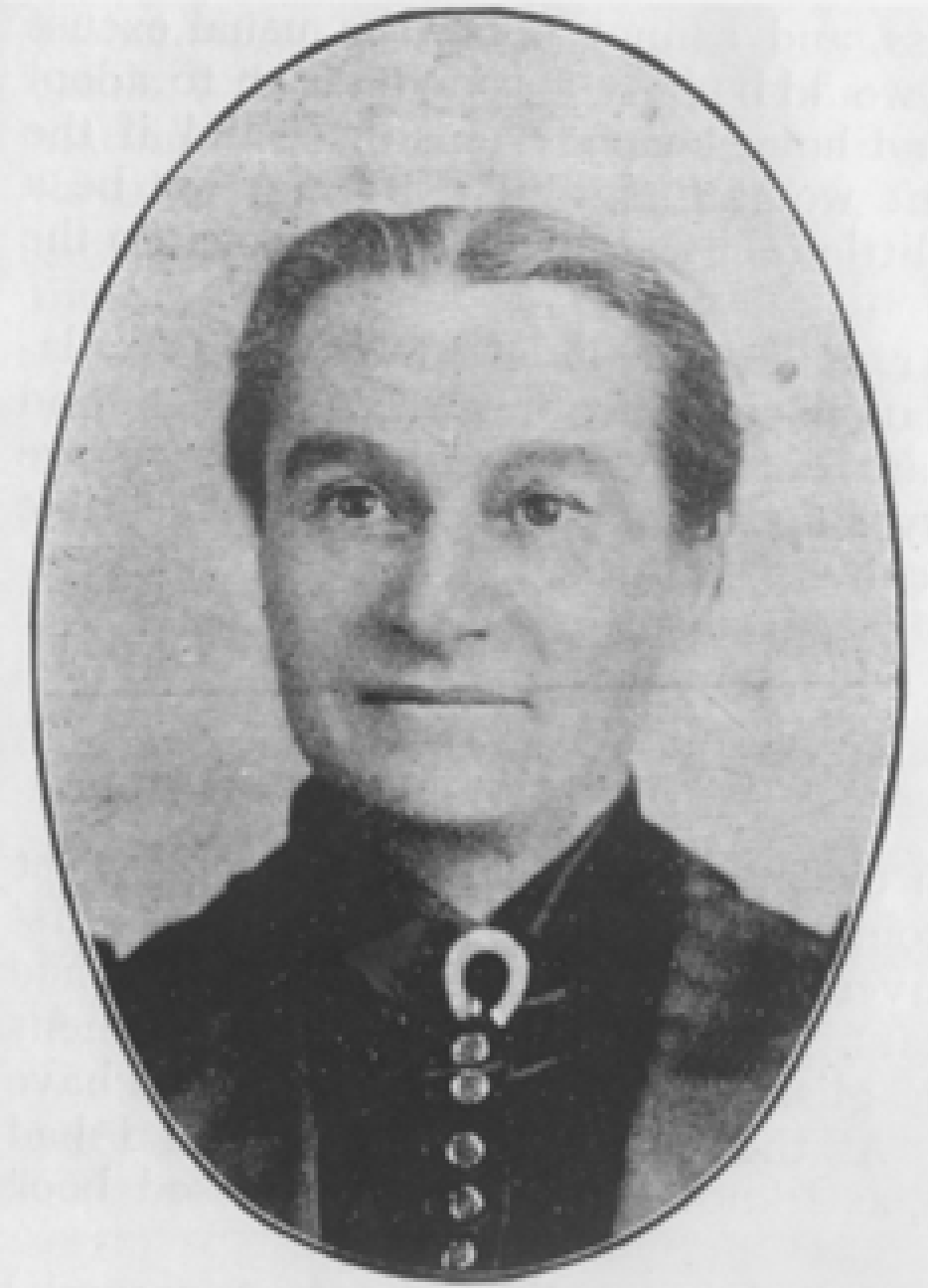
Veigele's mother Alexandrine, 1895

The Women's Vegetarian Union (WVU) was founded in London in March 1895 by Veigele's mother, Alexandrine. Veigele served as honorary superintendent of an agency depot connected with the organisation, and later as assistant secretary and honorary secretary. James Gregory describes the WVU as a forum for women involved in food reform and moral education.

=== Vegetarian Federal Union ===
Veigele was a member of the Vegetarian Federal Union's editorial and executive committees. Other committee members included Henry B. Amos, Josiah Oldfield, R. E. O'Callaghan, and May Yates.

=== Women's International Progressive Union ===
In February 1896 Veigele founded the Women's International Progressive Union in London and served as its secretary. The organisation was described as non-political and non-sectarian. It sought to promote women's participation in educational and social work through lectures and discussions, and held 21 meetings in its first year. Her mother was also involved in its administration.

=== International work ===
Veigele attended the Congrès féministe international ("International Feminist Congress") in Brussels in 1897. While there, she established the Société Belge pour l'étude de la réforme alimentaire ("Belgian Society for the Study of Food Reform"), which sought to bring together supporters of vegetarianism in Belgium. The society soon began publishing a bimonthly periodical, La Réforme alimentaire, edited by M. A. Maerschalck.

In 1899 Veigele helped establish the Dublin Society for the Study of Food Reform, working with Mrs. E. King-Flewitt and Mrs. Sophia Gough, a fellow vegetarian and the wife of the proprietor of Gough's Temperance Hotel on Exchequer Street, Dublin.

== Personal life and death ==
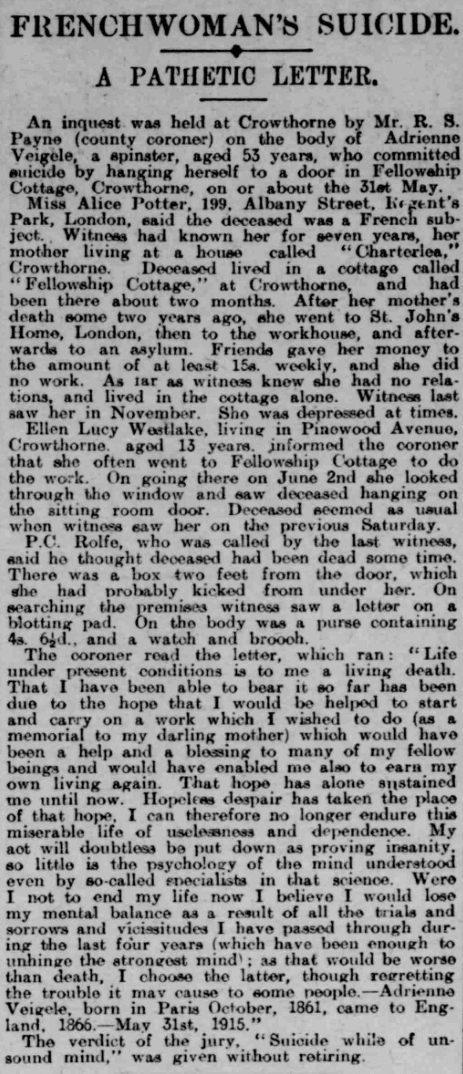
Berkshire Chronicle report on Veigele's suicide, 11 June 1915

In the 1901 United Kingdom census, Veigele and her mother were recorded as naturalised British subjects.

Veigele's later years were affected by illness and financial hardship. Her mother died in 1913 after experiencing poverty and the effects of her daughter's illness, while attempting to establish a boarding house. After her mother's death, Veigele was reported to have moved to St John's Home in London and later entered the workhouse, before being admitted to an asylum.

Veigele died by suicide by hanging at her cottage in Crowthorne, where she had lived for about two months, between 29 May and 2 June 1915; she was 53. A newspaper report of the inquest gave the date as about 31 May 1915. The coroner read a letter found at the scene in which Veigele attributed her state of mind to prolonged illness, poverty and dependence and wrote that she no longer felt able to endure her circumstances. The jury returned a verdict of "Suicide while of unsound mind".

== See also ==
- List of vegetarians
- History of vegetarianism
- Vegetarianism in the Victorian era
- Women and vegetarianism and veganism advocacy
