= Charles Crawford =

Charles Crawford may refer to:

- Charles Crawford (American football) (born 1964), American football running back
- Charles Crawford (diplomat) (born 1954), British diplomat
- Charles Crawford (psychologist) (born 1937), Canadian evolutionary psychologist
- Charles Crawford (racing driver) (1897–1958), American racecar driver
- Charles Crawford (United States Army officer), (1866–1945), United States Army officer and author
- Charles B. Crawford (1884–1951), head coach of the University of Virginia college football program, 1910
- Charles H. Crawford (1879–1931), Los Angeles criminal and political figure
- USS Charles P. Crawford, United States Navy minesweeper and tug in commission from 1917 to 1919
- Charles Ray Crawford (1966–2025), American convicted murderer
- Charles W. Crawford (Royal Navy officer) (1873–1984), British Royal Navy officer and philatelist
- Charles W. Crawford (chemist) (1888–1957), American chemist
