= Henry Tanner =

Henry Tanner may refer to:

- Henry Ossawa Tanner (1859–1937), African-American artist
- H. W. Lloyd Tanner (Henry William Lloyd Tanner, 1851–1915), British mathematician
- Henry Schenck Tanner (1786–1858), American cartographer
- Henry S. Tanner (doctor) (1831–1918), American doctor known for his 1880 great fast in New York
- Henry Ernest Tanner (1868–1940), English-born farmer and political figure in British Columbia
- Henry Tanner (architect) (1849–1935), British architect, President of the Concrete Society
