= Edward Dewey =

Edward Dewey may refer to:

- Edward R. Dewey (1895–1978), economist
- Edward H. Dewey (1837–1904), doctor and pioneer of therapeutic fasting
