= Eustace Miles =

English real tennis player, author and restaurateur

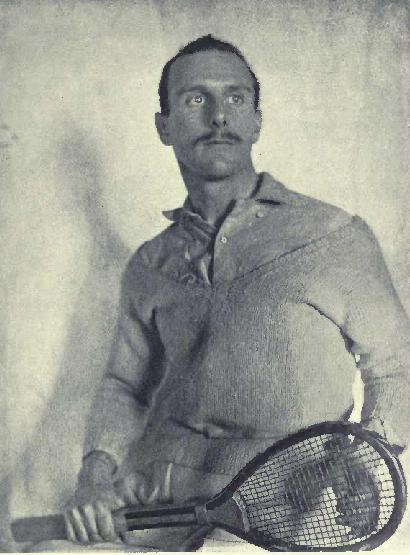
- Miles in 1908

Personal information
- Full name: Eustace Hamilton Miles
- Born: 22 September 1868 Hampstead, England
- Died: 20 December 1948 (aged 80) England
- Education: Eastbourne College; Marlborough College; King's College, Cambridge
- Spouse: Dorothy Beatrice Harriet Killick (m. 1906)

Sport
- Country: Great Britain
- Sport: Real tennis; Racquets; Squash

Achievements and titles
- Olympic finals: 1908 Summer Olympics
Medal record
Silver medal – second place	1908 London	Jeu de paume – Singles

Eustace Hamilton Miles (22 September 1868 – 20 December 1948) was an English real tennis player, author and restaurateur. He competed in the 1908 Summer Olympics and was a vegetarian who disliked that label and made his name selling health products and health advice to Edwardian Britons.

== Early life and education ==
Miles was the grandson of Sir William Miles, 1st Baronet by his son Captain William Henry Miles, J.P. (1830–1888) and Mary Frances Miles, née Charleton. He was born at Hampstead and was educated at Eastbourne College, Marlborough College and King's College, Cambridge. In 1906, Miles married Dorothy Beatrice Harriet Killick (nicknamed Hallie).

== Career ==
In 1908, he won the Olympic silver medal at the age of 39, after losing the final to Jay Gould II, the bronze medal was won by The Hon Neville Bulwer-Lytton, later 3rd Earl of Lytton. Miles had, in fact, coached the much younger Gould during his stay in America from 1900 to 1902 when he became the first non-American winner of the US Championship in 1900. He won further the amateur racquets championship of the world in singles in 1906 and in doubles in 1902, 1904, 1905 and 1906; and of England in doubles as well as becoming amateur squash racquets champion of America in 1900. He was amateur real tennis champion of England in 1898–1903, 1905, 1906, 1909 and 1911 and amateur real tennis champion of the world from 1898 to 1903 and 1905.

Miles was a prolific author, including collaborations with lifelong friend E. F. Benson with whom he may have had a college romance, on diverse subjects including health (e.g. "Fitness for Play and Work" 1912), athletics ("An Alphabet of Athletics"), diet ("The Failures of Vegetarianism" 1902), ancient history ("A History of Rome up to 500 AD, with Essays, Maps and Aids to Memory" 1901) and Classics ("Comparative Syntax of Greek and Latin"). His wife, also an author, and him both engaged in philanthropic works including providing free food and clothing to the poor of London, available during winter months near Cleopatra's Needle, a charitable exercise supported strongly by Queen Alexandra.

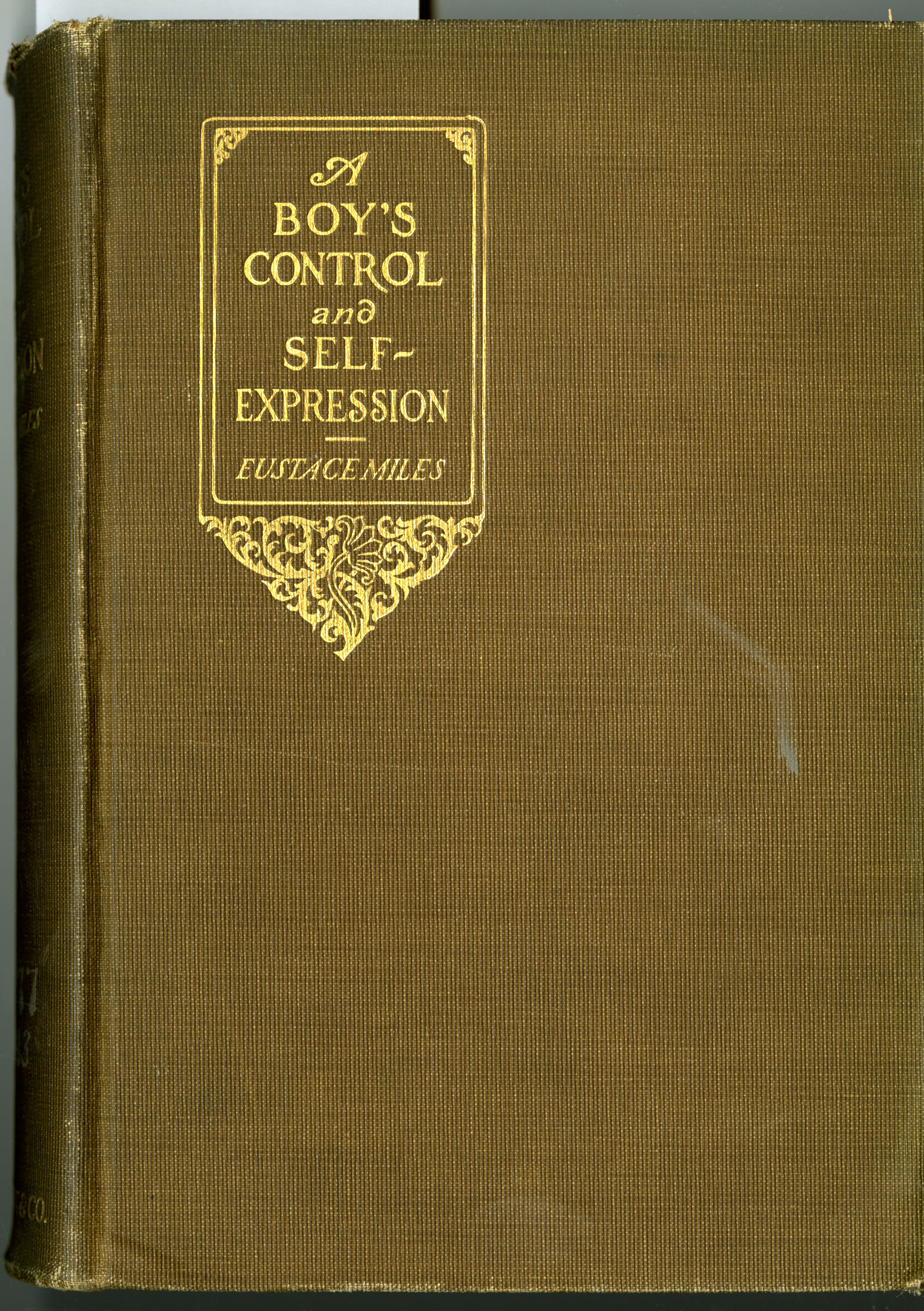
A Boy's Control and Self-Expression, published in 1904.

== Health and diet advocacy ==
Miles authored many books on dieting and vegetarianism. Miles's comprehensive regimen combined abstention from alcohol with games, daily practice of gymnastics, personal cleanliness, breathing exercises, and meditation. Miles promoted the concept of "mental hygiene". He published a monthly magazine, Healthward Ho!. He has been cited by historians as influential in the physical culture movement.

Miles advertised and experimented with different meatless diets. He originally embraced a uric-acid free diet but found it too restricting. He later criticized this diet in a booklet The Uric Acid Fetish (1915). Miles also experimented with Edward H. Dewey's "No Breakfast Plan" but abandoned it in favour of his own "No Lunch Plan". He was a vegetarian but refused to be identified under that label as he believed the practice of vegetarianism had many faults; he expounded on these ideas in his book The Failures of Vegetarianism. Miles criticized ordinary vegetarian diets that contained high volumes of fruit or vegetables for lacking protein. He stated that the only valuable part of a fruit or vegetable was the small amount of protein in the peelings of apples or potatoes but this was usually thrown away. His own diet emphasized muscle building foods such as dairy products, grains, legumes and meat substitutes which he called "Simpler Food". His diet was advertised to supply body-building and tissue repairing bases. Miles associated meat with alcohol consumption, noting that his desire for alcohol disappeared when gave up eating meat.

Miles promoted plasmon as a muscle building food. He drew publicity for his article on how to live on a diet of two plasmon biscuits and one lentil a day. In 1904, it was humorously reported in Punch that during the semi-final of a tennis competition, Miles was surrounded by an angry mob who compelled him to eat a meat chop. By 1906 Miles had dropped his advocacy for plasmon, replacing it with his own brand Emprote which he advertised as a health food. Emprote was composed of skimmed milk powder, wheat and added proteins. The name was based on Miles’ initials and an abbreviation of protein. It was sold as a protein powder and patented as a bread, "EM Bread".

Miles has been described as an advocate of lacto vegetarianism. His ideas about dieting were criticized by medical health experts as impractical. Physician William Tibbles suggested that "it seems almost impossible for any but the wealthy and leisured classes to follow his teachings thoroughly."

== Eustace Miles Restaurant ==
Miles was the owner of a vegetarian restaurant in Chandos Street, Charing Cross that was alleged to have served more than a thousand diners a day. He also owned health food shops in London and two other restaurants, in Carshalton and Chelsea. The restaurant is mentioned in the 1914 Gourmet Guide to London by Nathaniel Newnham-Davis and briefly mentioned in E. M. Forster's Howards End (1910).

Miles lectured on health whilst his wife Hallie advocated for animal rights. The Humanitarian League met at his restaurant. His lectures were popular with naturopaths, Theosophists and vegetarians. In 1907, Miles claimed 15,000 correspondents and 2,000 persons that he had "treated individually" within two years.

He was the owner of Eustace Miles Foods, a company that sold vegetarian food. He was also the chairman and managing director of the company. In 1933, it was reported that several directors had resigned over internal disputes leaving only Miles and his wife on the board. Although he expanded his business and his restaurant prospered during WWI, interest in vegetarianism declined during that time. Miles later went bankrupt and sold his properties. When he died he left only £175.

== Publications ==
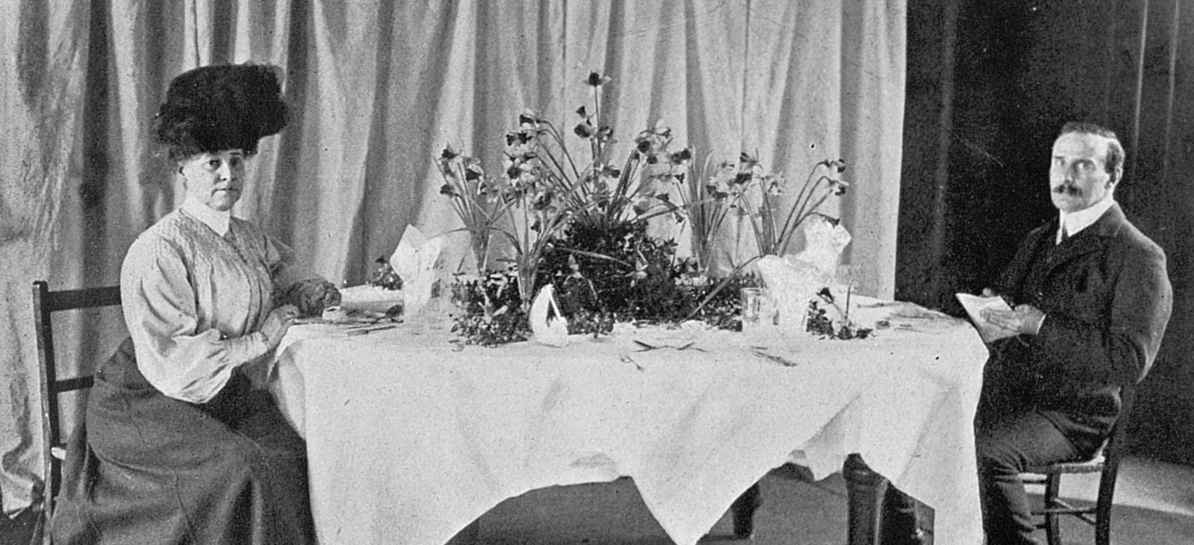
Miles with his wife Hallie at their restaurant in 1907

- Better Food for Boys (1901)
- The Game of Squash (1901)
- How to Remember: Without Memory Systems or with Them (Frederick Warne & Co., 1901)
- Avenues to Health (1902)
- The Failures of Vegetarianism (1902)
- Daily Training (1903) [with Edward Frederic Benson]
- Muscle, Brain, and Diet: A Plea for Simpler Foods (1903)
- Racquets, Tennis, and Squash (1903)
- A Boy's Control and Self-Expression (1904)
- An Alphabet of Athletics (1904)
- Breathing for Health, Athletics, and Brain-Work (1904)
- Cassell's Physical Educator (1904)
- Diversions Day By Day [with Edward Frederic Benson] (1905)
- How to Prepare Essays, Lectures, Articles, Books, Speeches and Letters, with Hints on Writing for the Press (London: Rivingtons, 1905)
- What Foods Feed Us (1905)
- The New Cookery of Unproprietary Foods (1906)
- Life After Life: The Theory of Reincarnation (1907)
- The Eustace Miles System of Physical Culture With Hints as to Diet (1907)
- The Training of the Body (1908)
- The Power of Concentration: How to Acquire It (1909)
- Fitness for Play and Work (1912)
- Prevention and Cure (1912)
- The Uric Acid Fetish (1915) [with C. H. Collings]
- Self-Health as a Habit (1919)
- Keep Happy (1920)
