= Emma Wardlaw Best =

British social reformer and writer (1856–1919)

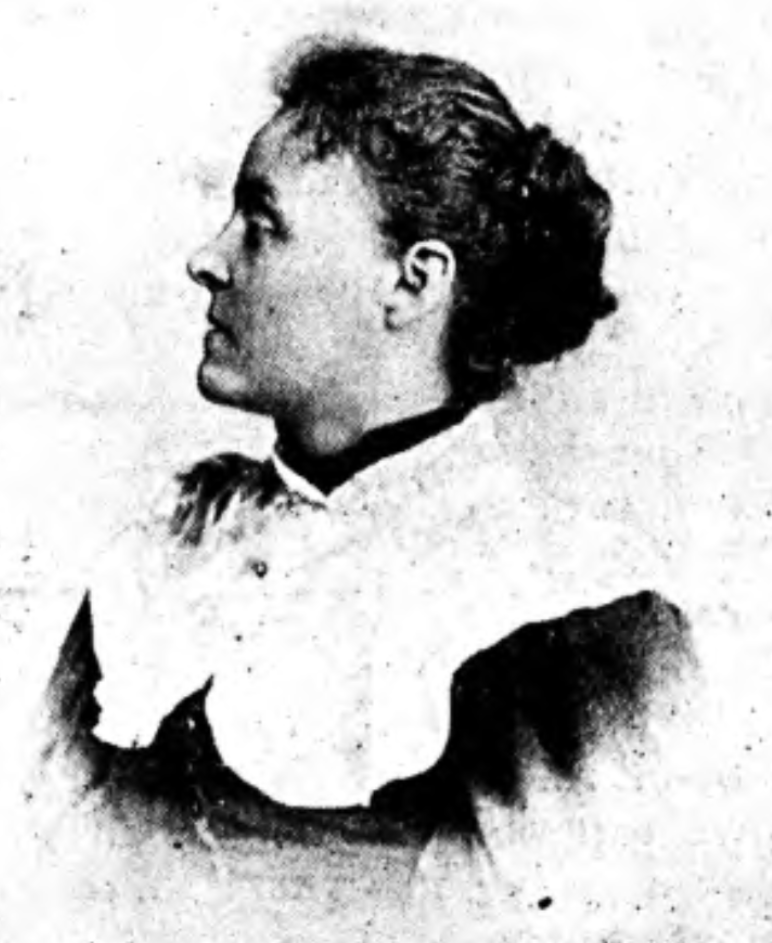
- Best, c. 1895
- Born: 31 May 1856; Agra, British India
- Died: December 1919 (aged 63); Mahé, Seychelles
- Occupations: Social reformer; writer
- Known for: Vegetarianism activism; women's rights activism; animal welfare work; free love advocacy
- Notable work: A Marriage Protest and Free Union Declaration
- Partner: Alfred Wastall (from 1898)
- Relatives: Sir Prescott Gardner Hewett (great-uncle)

Emma Wardlaw Best (31 May 1856 – December 1919) was a British social reformer and writer associated with vegetarianism, women's rights, animal welfare, and free love advocacy. She was treasurer of the Women's Vegetarian Union, honorary treasurer of the National Vigilance Association, a member of the Hammersmith Women's Liberal Association, and a committee member of the Legitimation League. In 1898, she announced an "autonomistic alliance" with Alfred Wastall and moved to the Seychelles, where she later died. She also lived in Australia, where she founded the Formosa Home for Stray Dogs in Sydney in 1908.

== Biography ==
=== Early life ===
Best was born on 31 May 1856 in Agra, British India. She was the daughter of John Rycraft Best, of the East India Company's Bengal Civil Service, and Annie Georgina Wardlaw. She was a great-niece of Sir Prescott Gardner Hewett.

=== Social reform ===
Best's moral aphorisms, published as "Arrows", and her verse appeared in Shafts from its first number. She belonged to the Hammersmith Women's Liberal Association and served on the committee of the Legitimation League. She also wrote on marriage law and legitimacy, including letters in Shafts in August 1893 and an article, "Our Troops in India", in The Adult. Best served as honorary treasurer of the National Vigilance Association.

=== Vegetarianism ===
Best served as treasurer of the Women's Vegetarian Union. In 1895, The Vegetarian published her account of becoming a vegetarian, accompanied by her photograph. She wrote that she had eaten meat until two or three years earlier, when an incident during a summer stay in North Wales led her to stop.

Best described finding a calf kept in an old ruined mill, where it had been left without food or water before slaughter. She asked a local butcher to let her buy it, but he refused, saying that the animal had been purchased for killing and that feeding or watering it would spoil the meat. Best wrote that the incident had made her a vegetarian and that she remained convinced that people had "no hope for mercy rendering none".

=== Free union and Seychelles ===
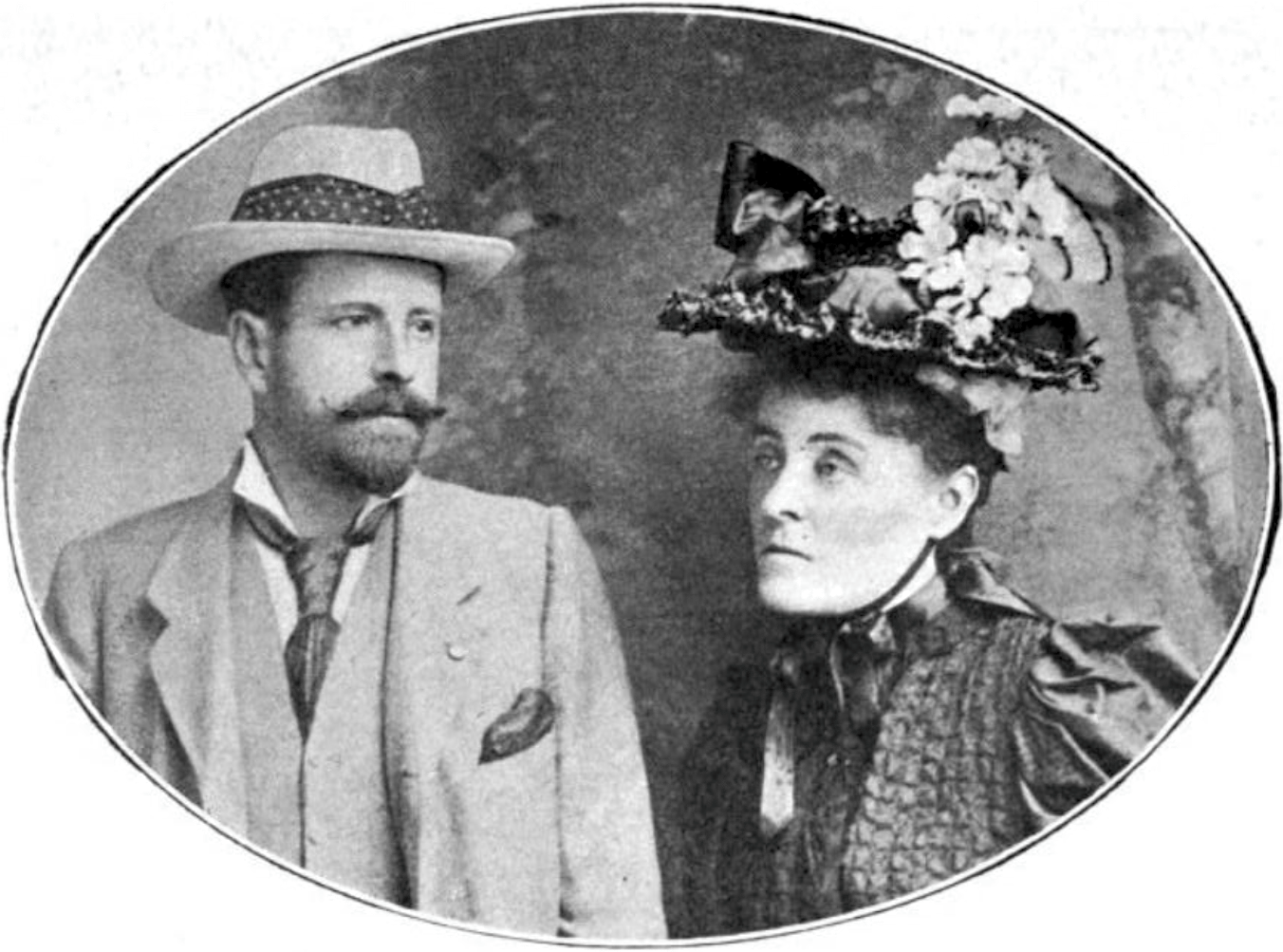
Arthur Wastall and Best, c. 1898

In 1898, Best announced an "autonomistic alliance" with Alfred Wastall, a food and sex reformer and editor of Emmet Densmore's Pure Food journal. They publicly announced their cohabitation and moved to the Seychelles. Historian Brian Harrison suggested that the move may have followed family or social pressure in England. Deryck Scarr wrote that Best, described as being from Cheltenham, moved there after practising free love with Arthur Wastall and publishing A Marriage Protest and Free Union Declaration.

=== Moyenne Island ===
Best built a small house on Moyenne Island, Seychelles, in 1899 and lived there with several dogs. A later travel account stated that she kept 70 dogs there at one time, and that local fishermen brought her dogs from other islands, which she believed to be rescued strays. The same account stated that she bought increasing quantities of fish from the fishermen to feed the dogs. A Seychelles travel guide states that Moyenne was once owned by Best, described as an eccentric Englishwoman, and that the island was abandoned from 1915 until the early 1970s, before it was purchased by Brendon Grimshaw.

=== Australia and animal welfare ===
Best later lived in Australia. In 1908, she established the Formosa Home for Stray Dogs at Neutral Bay, Sydney. The home, later called the North Sydney Home for Stray Dogs, was supported by volunteers connected with the Women's Society for the Prevention of Cruelty to Animals, including Linda Prince and her daughter Leela Prince. Best left Australia in 1911.

=== Death ===
Best died at Mahé, Seychelles, in December 1919.

== Publications ==
- A Marriage Protest and Free Union Declaration

== See also ==
- Women and vegetarianism and veganism advocacy
- Vegetarianism in the Victorian era
- Vegetarianism in the United Kingdom
- History of vegetarianism
- Women and animal advocacy
- Animal welfare and rights in Australia
