= Pinches =

Pinches is the surname of the following people:

- Alice Pinches (1865–1908), English vegetarianism activist
- Barry Pinches (born 1970), English snooker player
- Jennifer Pinches (born 1994), British artistic gymnast
- John Pinches (1916–2007), English rower, Royal Engineers officer, medallist and author
- Theophilus Pinches (1856–1934), English Assyriologist

== See also ==
- Pincher (disambiguation)
