= Verein Vegetarischer Frauen =

German women's vegetarian organisation (1910–1930)

- Martha and Georg Förster at the 1923 IVU Congress in Stockholm
- Formation: 1910; 116 years ago
- Founder: Martha Förster
- Dissolved: 1930; 96 years ago
- Type: Vegetarian organisation
- Headquarters: Dresden, Germany
- Members: 149 (1922)

The Verein Vegetarischer Frauen ("Association of Vegetarian Women") was a German women's vegetarian organisation based in Dresden. It was founded in 1910 by Martha Förster, who, together with her husband Georg Förster, was active in Dresden's organised vegetarian movement. By the end of 1922, it had 149 members, with members in Germany, Austria and Switzerland. In 1930, it merged with the Verband deutscher Vegetarier-Vereine ("Association of German Vegetarian Societies") to form the Deutscher Vegetarier-Verband ("German Vegetarian Association").

== History ==
An organised vegetarian association had existed in Dresden since 1881. In 1908, Martha and Georg Förster were among the founders of the International Vegetarian Union at its inaugural congress in Dresden. The Vegetarierverband Sachsen ("Vegetarian Association of Saxony") was formed in 1909, and Martha Förster founded the Verein Vegetarischer Frauen in Dresden the following year. Georg Förster served as treasurer and, for a time, chairman of the Dresden vegetarian association, and represented it in the Deutscher Vegetarier-Bund ("German Vegetarian Union").

Daniel Siemens places the association among specialised groups formed within the German vegetarian movement, alongside vegetarian singing, gymnastics, sports and youth organisations. A history published by the Svenska Vegetariska Föreningen ("Swedish Vegetarian Society") records that the association had 149 members at the end of 1922. At the International Vegetarian Congress held in Stockholm in 1923, Martha Förster represented the association. The congress report described it as an association of German vegetarian women with members in Germany, Austria and Switzerland.

In 1930, the Verein Vegetarischer Frauen and the Verband deutscher Vegetarier-Vereine ("Association of German Vegetarian Societies"), which Georg Förster had helped establish in Dresden in 1918, merged to form the Deutscher Vegetarier-Verband ("German Vegetarian Association").

== Publications ==
Vegetarisches Kochbuch (1922)

The association published the monthly Vegetarische Frauen-Zeitung ("Vegetarian Women's Newspaper"), which carried news about vegetarian organisations in other countries, recipes, and reports on the treatment of animals in slaughterhouses. In 1922, the association published the 28-page Vegetarisches Kochbuch ("Vegetarian Cookbook").

== See also ==
- History of vegetarianism
- Vegetarianism in Germany
- Women and vegetarianism and veganism advocacy
- Women's Vegetarian Union
