= Hallie Eustace Miles =

English writer, restaurateur, and social reformer (1855–1947)

Hallie Eustace Miles M.C.A. (Note: Member of the Cookery Association.)
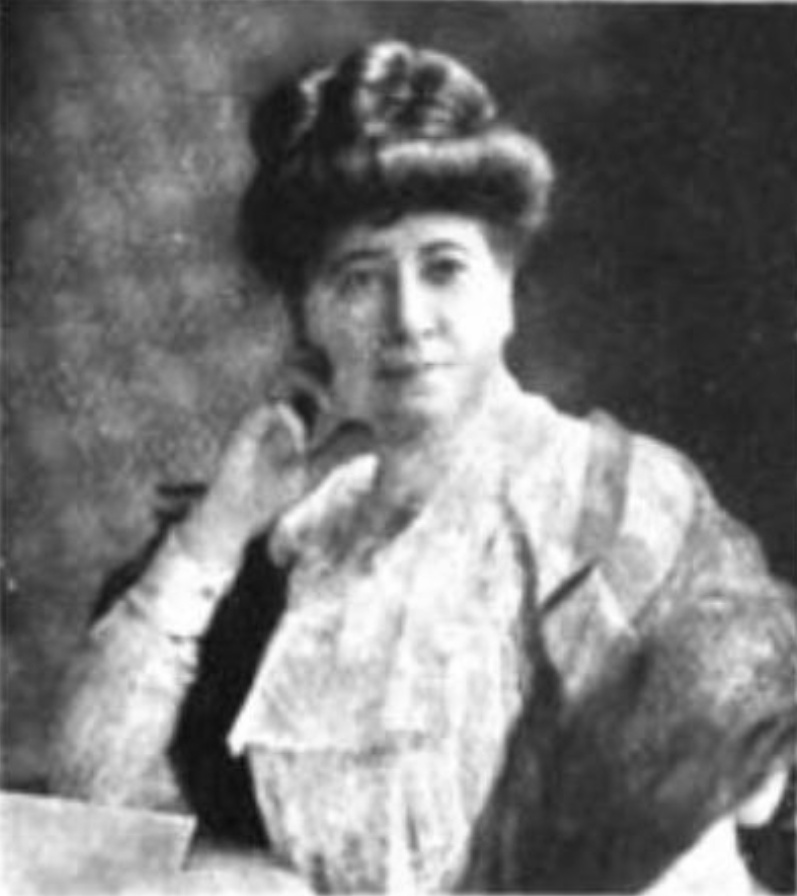
- Miles, c. 1911
- Born: Beatrice Dorothy Harriet Killick; 12 January 1855; Devizes, England
- Died: 25 November 1947 (aged 92); London, England
- Other names: Harriet Beatrice Dorothy Miles; Hallie Killick; Mrs. Eustace Miles
- Occupations: Writer; restaurateur; activist
- Notable work: Economy in Wartime; Or, Health Without Meat (1915); Untold Tales of War-time London: A Personal Diary (1930)
- Spouse: Eustace Miles (m. 1906)

Harriet Beatrice Dorothy "Hallie" Miles (born Beatrice Dorothy Harriet Killick; (Note: She also used Dorothy as her first name. Her middle name was variously spelled as Harriet, Harriett, and Harriette.) 12 January 1855 – 25 November 1947), who first wrote under the name Hallie Killick and later wrote as Hallie Eustace Miles and Mrs. Eustace Miles, was an English writer, restaurateur, and social reformer. She wrote on home economics, health, religion, social issues, and wartime life. Her works included the published World War I diary Untold Tales of War-time London: A Personal Diary (1930) and the vegetarian cookbook Economy in Wartime; Or, Health Without Meat (1915), later retitled Health Without Meat. Miles also contributed to newspapers including the Daily Mirror and Daily Express. With her husband, the sportsman and writer Eustace Miles, she operated a vegetarian restaurant and health food centre in London.

== Biography ==
=== Early and personal life ===
Beatrice Dorothy Harriet Killick was born on 12 January 1855 in Devizes. Her father was Rev. Richard Henry Killick.

In March 1906, she married Eustace Miles at St Clement Danes, London. The church had previously been associated with her father, who served as its vicar during the 1860s. After her father's death in 1903, Killick experienced depression. She later wrote that Expression and Depression, a book by Miles, helped in her recovery and led her to write about her own experiences. After finding Miles's address, she contacted him. Their correspondence developed into a relationship, and Killick adopted his dietary ideas, including vegetarianism, before their marriage.

=== Career ===
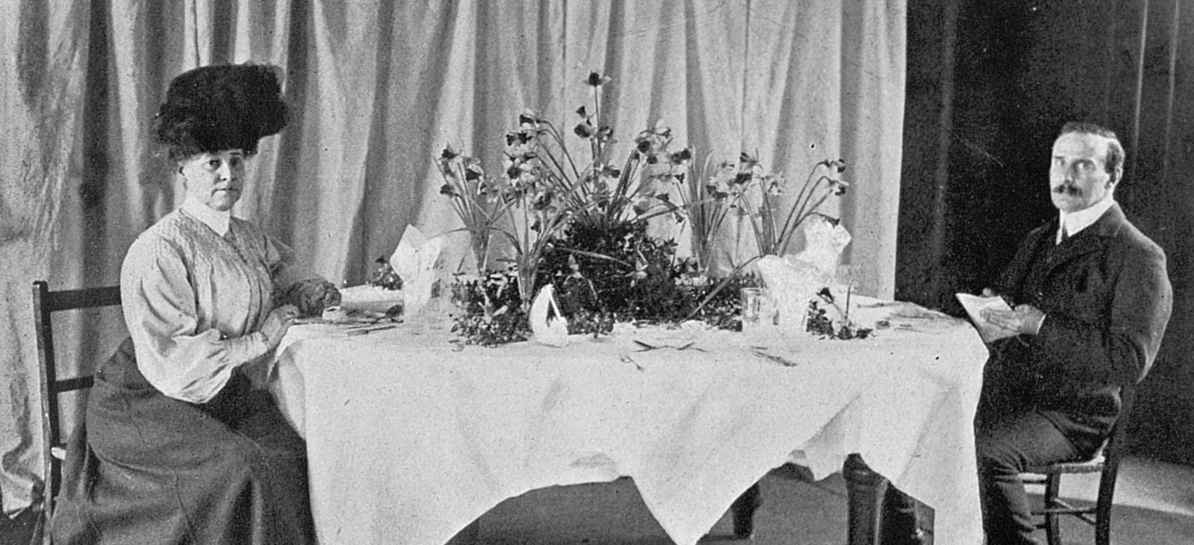
Miles with her husband at their vegetarian restaurant, 1907

Eustace Miles planned a "Simpler Food Restaurant" that would sell inexpensive meat-free meals. In 1906, after the couple's marriage, they opened the Eustace Miles Restaurant on Chandos Street, Charing Cross. It served meat-free meals for athletes, students, writers, workers, and professionals. Its customers also included suffragettes of the Women's Social and Political Union and Sylvia Pankhurst.

The restaurant served more than 1,000 meals a day. The American food writer James Beard described it as the "only quality vegetarian restaurant in London". For the next thirty years, the couple ran the restaurant, health food stores, and a line of protein and breakfast foods.

=== Writing ===
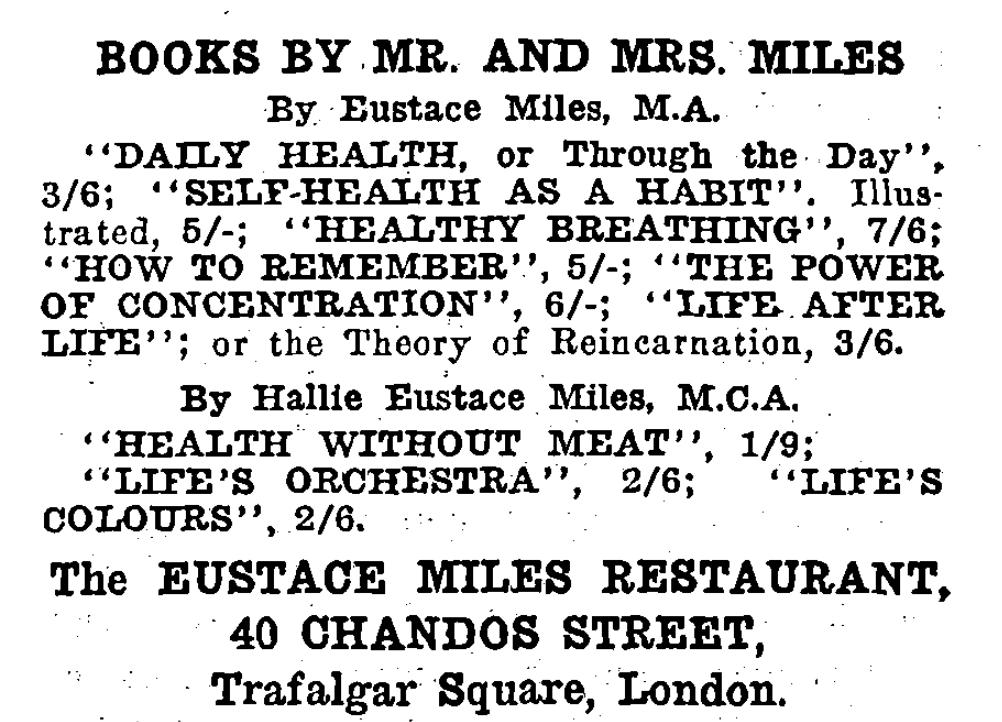
Advertisement for works by Miles and her husband, 1933

Miles's books included Life's Orchestra, Life's Colours, The Ideal Home and Its Problems, The Cry of the Animals to their Human Friends, Story of the Coronation and Passing of King Edward VII, The Pilgrimage of the Cross, Economy in Wartime; Or, Health Without Meat, The Cry of the Desolate, Our Kitchen, and The New Road.

During World War I, Miles kept a diary about her work organising concerts in hospitals and recruitment centres, the effect of the war on daily life, and the presence of refugees in London. It was published in 1930 as Untold Tales of War-time London: A Personal Diary. The diary has been cited in studies of wartime Britain and women's writing during the First World War.

In 1915, Miles published a vegetarian cookbook with 160 recipes, Economy in Wartime; Or, Health Without Meat, later retitled Health Without Meat. The book drew on her husband's dietetic principles and presented vegetarian meals as economical during wartime meat shortages. Miles addressed women as members of an "Army in the Kitchen" and connected low-meat and meat-free cookery with economy, hygiene, and health. The Mileses also took part in food education campaigns and gave cookery demonstrations. In the 1920s, the book was adapted for peacetime conditions, including unemployment, and promoted vegetarian dishes as cheaper alternatives to meat-based meals. Health Without Meat was praised by Health and Strength for the couple's work in food reform. A 14th edition was published in 1931.

Miles wrote for newspapers including the Daily Mirror and Daily Express.

=== Social reform ===
Miles supported animal rights, vegetarianism, and feminism. The Humanitarian League held meetings at the Eustace Miles Restaurant. With her husband, she distributed free food and clothing to poor people near Cleopatra's Needle, with support from Queen Alexandra. She also promoted food reform through recipes that combined simple vegetarian dishes, such as lentil salad and scrambled eggs on toast, with commercial protein supplements including Emprote.

=== Death ===
Miles died at her home in York Mansions, London, on 25 November 1947.

== Legacy ==
Miles's Economy in War Time was included in the University of Iowa Libraries' 2012 exhibition "Books in the World of Downton Abbey". In 2014, her diary was used in the documentary The Great War: The People's Story, in which Miles was portrayed by Alison Steadman. She was also included in Travis Elborough's list of "top 10 literary diarists".

== Publications ==
- From Shadow Into Sunshine: June 24 To October 26, 1902 (London: William Clowes & Sons, 1903)
- Life's Orchestra (preface by Helen Mathers; London: Anthony Treherne & Co., 1904)
- Life's Colours (introduction by Helene Vacaresco; London: Eustace Miles, 1906)
- The Animals' Plea for Sunday Rest (The Celtic Press, 1907)
- The Cry of the Animals and Birds to Their Human Friends in Their Own Words (introduction by Ernest Bell; foreword by John Strange Winter; London: Drane & Co., 1910)
- The Ideal Home and Its Problems (London: Methuen & Co., 1911)
- Story of the Coronation and Passing of King Edward VII (London: W. Clowes, 1911)
- The New Road
- The Pilgrimage of the Cross (London: Society for Promoting Christian Knowledge, 1912)
- Economy in Wartime; Or, Health Without Meat (Methuen & Co., 1915)
- The Cry of the Desolate (London: E. Miles)
- Our Kitchen (London: Eustace Miles)
- Milestones on the Road to All-Round Efficiency & Health (with Eustace Miles; London: Eustace Miles, 1922–1927)
- Untold Tales of War-time London: A Personal Diary (London: Cecil Palmer, 1930)

== See also ==
- History of vegetarianism
- Women and animal advocacy
- Women and vegetarianism and veganism advocacy
- Women in the Victorian era
- Vegetarianism in the United Kingdom
- Vegetarianism in the Victorian era
