= Caroline Anne Eccles =

English writer and activist (1871–1965)

- Eccles, c. 1931
- Born: 3 July 1871; Brigg, Lincolnshire
- Died: 11 February 1965 (aged 93); London, England
- Occupations: Writer; vegetarianism activist
- Writing career
- Language: English
- Subjects: Vegetarianism; Walt Whitman; James William Wallace

Caroline Anne Eccles (3 July 1871 – 11 February 1965), who published as Caroline A. Eccles and C. A. Eccles, was an English writer and vegetarianism activist. She contributed regularly to The Vegetarian Messenger, where she conducted the "Ladies' Page", and was connected with the Bolton Whitman Fellowship. Her publications included the novel The Princess Eloise (1931) and a memoir of James William Wallace, James William Wallace, an English Comrade of Walt Whitman (1936).

== Biography ==
=== Early and personal life ===
Eccles was born on 3 July 1871 in Brigg, Lincolnshire. For many years she lived in Driffield, East Yorkshire, with her brother, the physician Robert Burton Eccles, who practised there for about 50 years. She remained with him until his death in 1949.

=== Vegetarianism ===
Eccles stopped eating meat at the age of six, after she realised that the meat she was given came from lambs she had watched in the fields and asked not to be given meat again.

Eccles joined the Vegetarian Society in 1894. She reviewed books and regularly contributed to The Vegetarian Messenger. She conducted its "Ladies' Page", and attended the Vegetarian Congress in 1901.

=== Writing and Walt Whitman ===
Eccles was connected with the Bolton Whitman Fellowship, a group centred on the writings of American poet Walt Whitman. Carolyn Masel lists her among reformers who were connected with the Fellowship through visits or correspondence. In January 1912, Eccles published "An Appreciation of Walt Whitman" in The Quest.

She was also associated with James William Wallace, a leading member of the Bolton Whitman Fellowship. In March 1926, she published "Farewell and Godspeed! J. W. Wallace" in The Epoch. Her book James William Wallace, an English Comrade of Walt Whitman: A Memoir was published by the C. W. Daniel Company in 1936.

Eccles also wrote fiction. Her novel The Princess Eloise: A Romance was published in 1931. In 1906, The Crank published a letter from Eccles referring to Edwin Arnold's The Light of Asia and Lilian Edger's The Elements of Theosophy.

In March 1947, a fire at Eccles's home destroyed several of her manuscripts and letters. Among the material lost was a 16-chapter novel which she had spent many years writing and was then revising, as well as letters from Oliver Lodge and admirers of Walt Whitman concerning one of her writings.

=== Later life and death ===
By 1963, Eccles was living at 12 Hollywood Road, London. She died in London, on 11 February 1965, aged 93. She was cremated at Mortlake Crematorium on 17 February.

== Publications ==
- "An Appreciation of Walt Whitman" (1912)
- "Farewell and Godspeed! J. W. Wallace" (1926)
- The Princess Eloise: A Romance (1931)
- James William Wallace, an English Comrade of Walt Whitman: A Memoir (1936)

== See also ==
- History of vegetarianism
- Vegetarianism in the Victorian era
- Vegetarianism in the United Kingdom
- Women and vegetarianism and veganism advocacy
