= Edward H. Dewey =

American alternative medic (1837–1904)

Edward Hooker Dewey
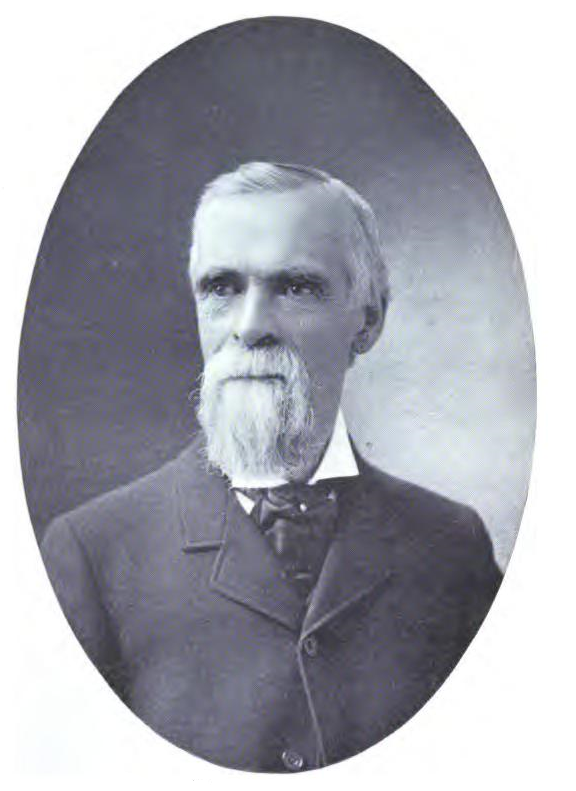
- Born: 21 May 1837; Wayland, Pennsylvania, United States
- Died: December 21, 1904 (aged 67); Meadville, Pennsylvania, United States
- Education: University of Michigan
- Scientific career
- Fields: Physician, assistant surgeon

Edward Hooker Dewey (21 May 1837 – 21 December 1904) was an American physician. He was a pioneer of therapeutic fasting and the inventor of the "No Breakfast Plan".

== Career ==
Dewey graduated from the College of Medicine and Surgery of the University of Michigan in 1864 with a medical degree, and became an assistant surgeon in the Army of the United States. From 1866 he started to work in Meadville, Pennsylvania.

Dewey's The True Science of Living (1895) had been reprinted at least four times by 1908. His sequel The No-Breakfast Plan and the Fasting Cure (1900) was very successful with the public. By 1921 it had gone through three editions and was translated into French and German. Dewey argued for people to completely abstain from breakfast, and only consume two meals per day. He attributed all disease and physiological problems to excessive eating. He advocated long fasts and believed that abstinence from food could cure insanity and mental disorders. Dewey was a Protestant and affirmed harmony of his "No Breakfast Plan" with the Christian Gospel. Evangelist George Frederick Pentecost wrote the introduction to The True Science of Living.

== Reception ==
Dewey's ideas were popular in the early 20th century but were not accepted by medical experts. In 1910, the British Medical Journal described Dewey as "not an accurate or careful writer", noting medical errors in his book The No-Breakfast Plan and the Fasting-Cure. The journal concluded that his ideas about fasting being a cure-all for disease was not supported by solid evidence and was a "foolish delusion". Physician William Tibbles wrote that moderate fasts are beneficial but should be carried out under proper medical supervision. He noted that Dewey took the principles of fasting to an "irrational extreme".

Dewey influenced alternative health writers such as Hereward Carrington and Wallace Wattles. Linda Hazzard, author of The Science of Fasting, studied under Dewey. Hazzard was a quack doctor noted for her promotion of fasting as a treatment, and was imprisoned by the state of Washington for a number of deaths resulting from this at a sanatorium she operated there in the early 20th century.

== Publications ==
- The True Science of Living: The New Gospel of Health (1895)
- A New Era for Women: Health Without Drugs (1896)
- Chronic Alcoholism (1899)
- The No-Breakfast Plan and the Fasting-Cure (1900)

== See also ==
- Henry S. Tanner
