= Alexandrine Veigele =

French activist (1840–1913)

- Alexandrine Veigelé
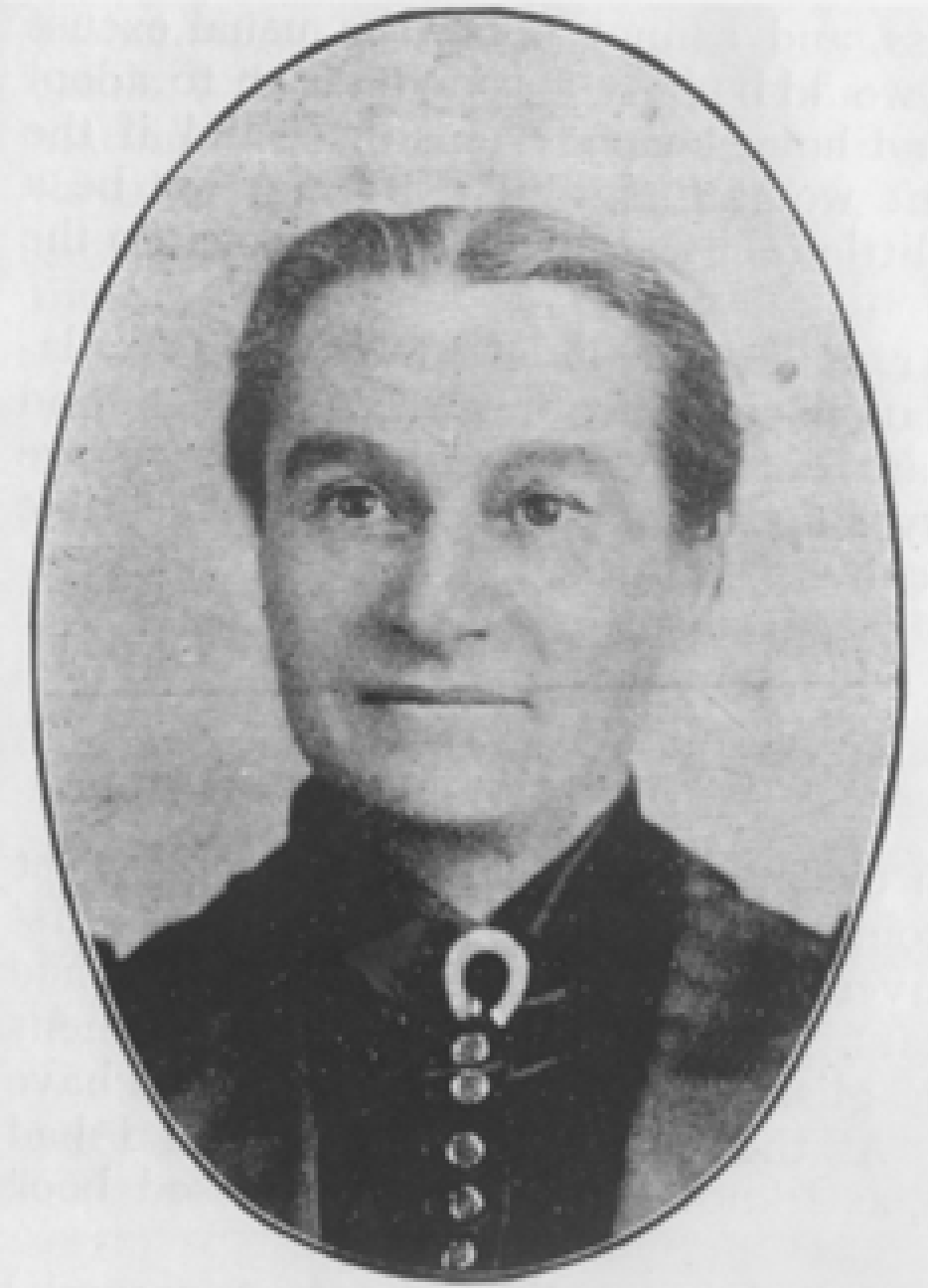
- Veigele in 1895
- Born: August 1840; Paris, France
- Died: June 1913 (aged 72); Raynes Park, Surrey, England
- Resting place: Morden Cemetery
- Citizenship: French; British
- Occupations: Vegetarianism and women's rights activist
- Known for: Founding the Women's Vegetarian Union
- Spouse: John Veigele (died)
- Children: Adrienne Veigele

Alexandrine Veigele (French: Alexandrine Veigelé; (Note: French pronunciation: [vɛ.ʒ(ə).le] VEZH-uh-LAY; her surname is also recorded as Veigelè.) August 1840 – June 1913) was a French-born activist for vegetarianism and women's rights, later naturalised as a British citizen. After settling in London, she worked as a French teacher and became involved in the vegetarian movement after adopting the diet in 1888.

In 1895 Veigele founded the Women's Vegetarian Union, a vegetarian society for women, and served as its first president. The union promoted dietary reform through cookery classes, lectures, social events and practical services, including a Vegetarian Depot and an employment agency for vegetarians. Veigele was also associated with the London Vegetarian Society and was a founder member of the Women's Progressive Union. Her daughter, Adrienne Veigele, was also active in vegetarian and women's organisations.

== Biography ==
=== Early life ===
Alexandrine Veigele was born in Paris in August 1840. She later married John Veigele. In October 1866, the family moved to London with their daughter Adrienne, then aged five. Her husband worked as a tailor, and Veigele worked as a French teacher. Veigele experienced chronic illness for a number of years.

=== Vegetarianism activism ===
Veigele adopted vegetarianism in 1888 for economic and health reasons, after learning of the diet from a prospective boarder, Chandos Leigh Hunt Wallace. The Labour Annual reported that her health improved and that she was then able to work 16 to 18 hours a day.

By the early 1890s she was active in the vegetarian movement and joined the London Vegetarian Society. In 1898, she published Is Meat Eating Beneficial to Health? A Paddington Lady's Experience.

==== Women's Vegetarian Union ====
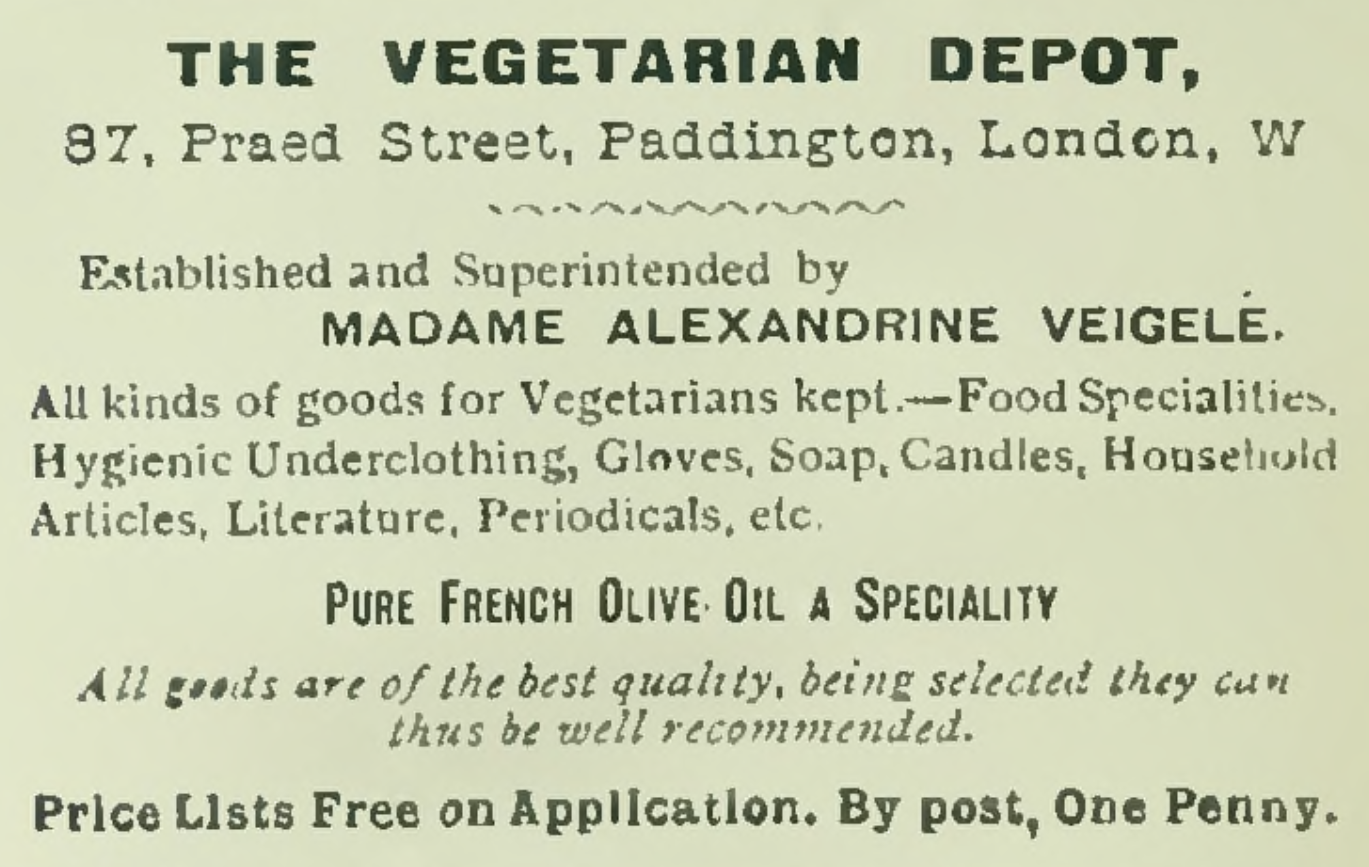
1899 advertisement for the Vegetarian Depot

On 5 March 1895, Veigele founded the Women's Vegetarian Union at Granville House, Arundel Street, London, with 50 women attending the inaugural meeting. She was elected the organisation's first president. It was described as the first vegetarian society established specifically for women. Full members pledged to abstain from meat, while associates undertook to promote knowledge of health and vegetarian principles.

Within two years membership had risen to about 300, including women from France, Belgium, Germany, Italy, the Seychelles and Switzerland. English supporters included May Yates of the Bread Reform League, the lecturer Chandos Leigh Hunt Wallace, and Mrs. Allinson, wife of the physician and bread reformer Thomas Allinson.

The society promoted vegetarian cookery and associated dietary reform with sobriety and temperance. Its work included lectures, cookery demonstrations, social gatherings and the provision of low-cost meals for poor people.

It also operated a Vegetarian Depot that supplied food and household items, and an agency that placed vegetarian servants in vegetarian households. These enterprises were described as practical support for vegetarians and as schemes for providing pensions, accommodation and employment opportunities. Veigele's daughter served as honorary superintendent of the Depot and as honorary secretary of the union.

Feminist periodicals such as Shafts and The Woman's Signal covered the Union's activities in connection with debates on women's rights, domestic reform and social welfare.

=== Women's Progressive Union ===
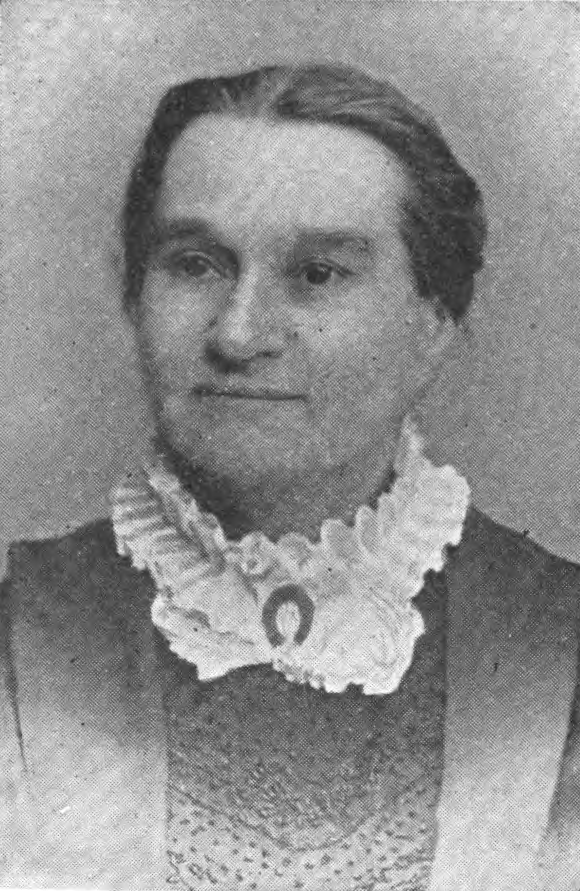
Veigele, c. 1900

Veigele was, along with Margaret Sibthorp, a founding member of the Women's Progressive Union. Her daughter later established the Women's International Progressive Union, with her mother serving as its honorary secretary.

=== Later years and death ===
In the 1901 United Kingdom census, Veigele was recorded as a widowed, naturalised British subject.

Veigele's final years were affected by her daughter's illness and financial difficulties. She died at St John's Home, Raynes Park, Surrey, in June 1913, aged 72, shortly after attempting to establish a boarding house at Crowthorne. She was buried at Morden Cemetery on 11 June.

== Publications ==
- Is Meat Eating Beneficial to Health? A Paddington Lady's Experience. London: Vegetarian Depot and General Agency. 1898.

== See also ==
- History of vegetarianism
- Vegetarianism in the Victorian era
- Women and vegetarianism and veganism advocacy
