= Morden Cemetery =

Cemetery in Morden, Merton, London

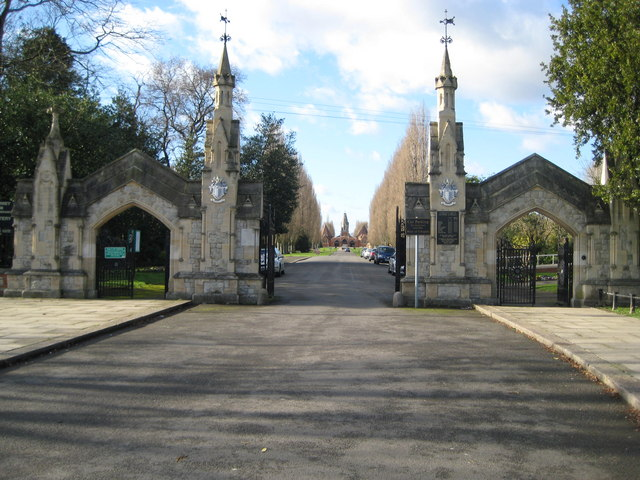
- Main entrance to Morden Cemetery
- Interactive map of Morden Cemetery

Details
- Established: 17 March 1891
- Location: Lower Morden, Morden, London Borough of Merton, London
- Country: United Kingdom
- Coordinates: 51°23′27″N 0°13′50″W
- Find a Grave: Morden Cemetery

Morden Cemetery, also known as Battersea New Cemetery, is a cemetery in the Lower Morden area of the town of Morden within the London Borough of Merton, London, England. It opened on 17 March 1891. A crematorium in Morden Cemetery, North East Surrey Crematorium, is located near an area of the cemetery called the Gardens of Remembrance. The crematorium opened in 1958.

== History ==
In February 1889, the Battersea Burial Board made a proposal to the British government to allow them to purchase the 127-acre (51 ha) Hobald's Farm where Morden Cemetery would be built. In December, then-Home Secretary Henry Matthews approved the purchase. Morden Cemetery opened on 17 March 1891. In 1958, a crematorium, North East Surrey Crematorium, opened in the cemetery.

== Notable burials ==
Notable burials at Morden Cemetery include:

- Rutland Barrington (1853-1922), singer, actor, playwright (memorial erected 75th anniversary of his death by Gilbert & Sullivan Society and others)
- Charles W. Crawford (1873–1934), British Royal Navy officer
- Alexandrine Veigele (1840–1913), French activist

In addition, the cemetery also contains the war graves of 287 Commonwealth service personnel from World War I and World War II.
