= Pincher =

Pincher may refer to:

== Geography ==
- Pincher Station, Alberta
- Pincher Creek a town in the southwest of Alberta, Canada

== People ==
- Chapman Pincher (1914–2014), English journalist, historian and novelist, especially on espionage
- Chris Pincher (born 1969), British politician
- Pinchers, Jamaican reggae and dancehall artist

== Other ==
- Pincher (Gobots), a transforming robot toy
- pyncher, British alternative rock band
- A misspelling for Pincers (tool)

== See also ==
- Pincher Martin, a novel by William Golding
- Pinscher, a type of dog
- Pinches, a surname
