= Charles Crawford (psychologist) =

Canadian psychologist

- Born: Charles Bates Crawford; April 5, 1937 (age 88); High Prairie, Alberta
- Education: University of Alberta; McGill University
- Scientific career
- Fields: Evolutionary psychology
- Institutions: Simon Fraser University
- Thesis: Analytic methods of rotation in the determination of the number of factors (1966)
- Doctoral advisor: George A. Ferguson

Charles Bates Crawford (born April 5, 1937) is a Canadian evolutionary psychologist and professor emeritus of psychology at Simon Fraser University. He is a fellow of the Association for Psychological Science and the Canadian Psychological Association. In 2002, he received Simon Fraser University's Nora and Ted Sterling Prize in Support of Controversy, and he retired from the university's faculty that same year. When Crawford received the Sterling Prize, the committee's chairman Barry Beyerstein stated that the award's purpose "who swim against the tide of popular opinion and challenge entrenched authority or prejudice with reason and evidence. The committee was unanimous in its decision that Charles Crawford exemplifies the highest standards of that tradition." Crawford had attracted considerable attention for his controversial opinions regarding the causes of sex differences in behavior, anorexia, rape, and other social phenomena.
