= Women's Vegetarian Union =

Defunct international women's vegetarian organisation

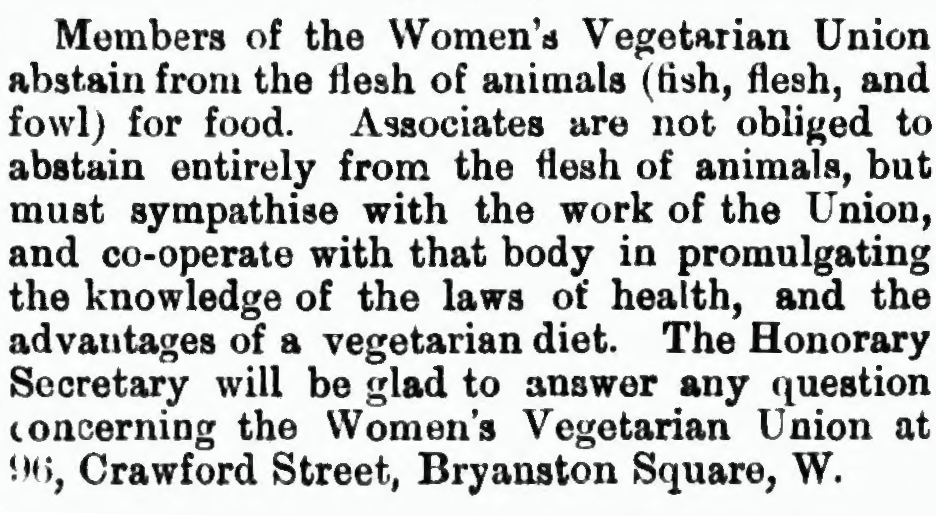
- Membership notice of the Women's Vegetarian Union
- Abbreviation: WVU
- Formation: 5 March 1895; 131 years ago
- Founder: Alexandrine Veigelé
- Dissolved: After 1906
- Headquarters: 96 Crawford Street; 87 Praed Street; 37 Hereford Road, Bayswater
- Location: London, England
- Region served: Worldwide
- Members: 350 (1900)
- President: Alexandrine Veigelé; May Yates; Charlotte Despard
- Affiliations: Vegetarian Federal Union

The Women's Vegetarian Union (Note: Also known as the International Women's Vegetarian Union and Women's Vegetarian Union (International).) (WVU) was an international women's vegetarian organisation founded in London in 1895 by Alexandrine Veigelé. (Note: Her surname is sometimes recorded as Veigelè or Veigele.) Its presidents included Veigelé, May Yates and Charlotte Despard. The WVU promoted vegetarianism among women through meetings, lectures, cookery demonstrations and public outreach. It also supported health and temperance work, operated a Vegetarian Depot and a General Agency Department, and was affiliated with the Vegetarian Federal Union.

The union had branches in Lambeth and Brussels, and reported representatives in several European countries and the Seychelles. In 1900 it reported about 350 members and associates. The Brussels branch maintained a vegetarian library and published the bimonthly periodical La Reforme alimentaire. The WVU organised the first International Conference of Vegetarian Women in 1905, and its activities were still being reported in 1906.

== History ==
=== Foundation and early years ===
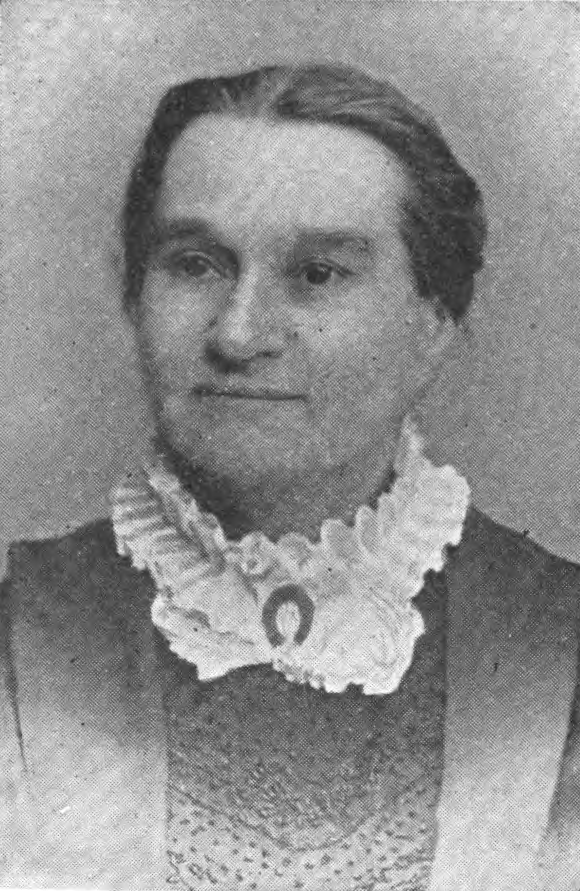
Alexandrine Veigelé, founder of the WVU, c. 1900

The WVU was formed on 5 March 1895 at Granville House, Arundel Street, Strand, London, with about fifty women in attendance. The society was proposed by Alexandrine Veigelé, who was elected its president.

The WVU was headquartered at 96 Crawford Street, London. It later moved to 87 Praed Street and then to 37 Hereford Road, Bayswater.

The WVU's first annual report, covering March 1895 to March 1896, listed Veigelé as president-founder, Emma Wardlaw Best as honorary treasurer, Adrienne Veigelé (Veigelé's daughter) as honorary secretary, and Veigelé as honorary lady superintendent of the General Agency Department. Its vice-presidents included Anna Allinson, Sarah Amos, Laura Ormiston Chant, Margaret Sibthorp, May Yates and C. L. H. Wallace, while A. M. Cole served on the committee.

The union's rules defined members as women concerned with "the health, prosperity and happiness of the human race". Women could join internationally as members or associates, while vegetarian men could join as honorary members. Members abstained from meat, while associates supported the promotion of health and the advantages of a vegetarian diet.

=== Affiliation and expansion ===
The WVU was affiliated with the Vegetarian Federal Union (VFU). In 1897 the VFU's annual report recorded that the WVU had around 300 members and associates, together with honorary members and representatives in several European countries and the Seychelles.

By 1897, the WVU's officers had changed: Anna Allinson was honorary treasurer, Alice Pinches was honorary reporter, Adrienne Veigelé was honorary secretary, and Elisa Righetti was assistant secretary.

The report also stated that the WVU had branches at Lambeth and Brussels, and that a further branch was being formed in the United States. The Brussels branch, known as the Société belge pour l'étude de la réforme alimentaire ("Belgian Society for the Study of Dietary Reform"), maintained a vegetarian library and published the bimonthly periodical La Reforme alimentaire, described in the report as the first vegetarian periodical to appear in Belgium.

In October 1900, The Vegetarian Magazine reported that the WVU had 350 members and associates.

=== International conference and later activity ===
In June 1905, The Queen and The Daily News reported that the WVU would hold the first International Conference of Vegetarian Women on 21 June at Memorial Hall. Representatives from the United States, Italy, Belgium and France were expected to attend. The programme included papers by Lady Henry Somerset, Lady Paget, Mlle Truchard, Mme de Looy and Adelaide Johnston, and a discussion on educational methods of helping the unemployed. The annual meeting was to be chaired by May Yates, and C. L. H. Wallace would chair the conference.

On 22 June 1906, the WVU held its annual meeting at Memorial Hall. Charlotte Despard, the union's president, chaired the meeting. Lizzy Lind af Hageby spoke about the health benefits she said she had experienced after six years as a vegetarian, and J. Stenson Hooker spoke about the financial savings he associated with a vegetarian diet.

== Activities ==
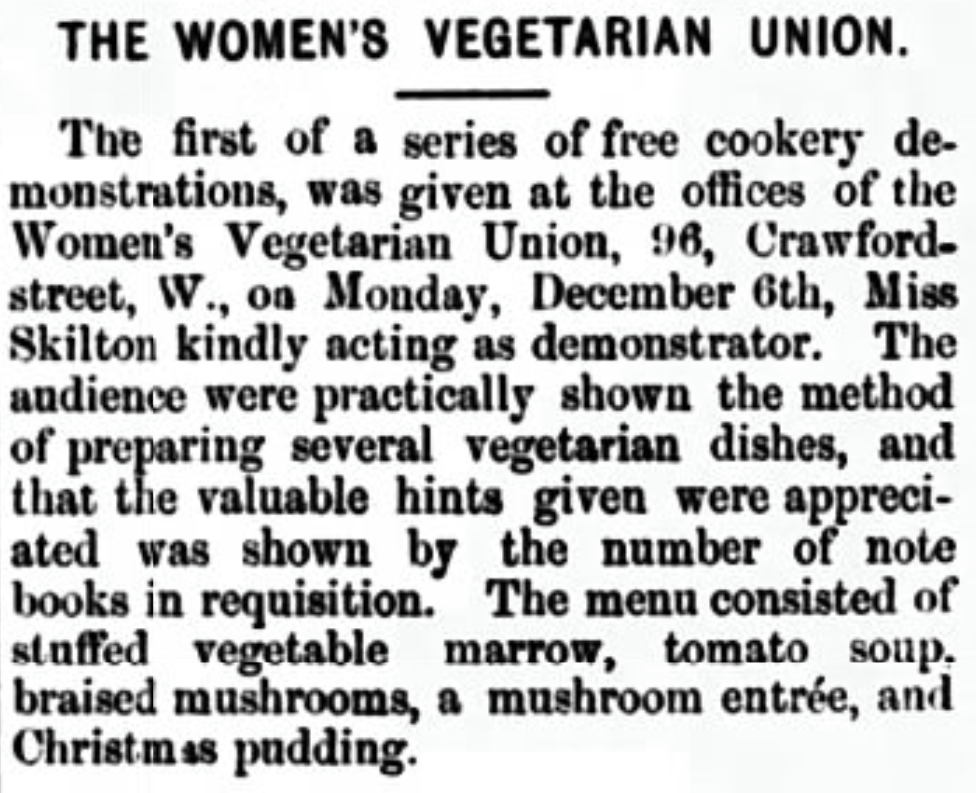
Newspaper notice about cookery demonstrations held by the WVU, 1897

=== Cookery and public outreach ===
The WVU organised cookery demonstrations, lectures, social receptions, public demonstrations and cookery classes. It provided penny dinners for poor people and gave lectures on health. The organisation sometimes worked with temperance groups, including the Woman's Christian Temperance Union.

In December 1904, the Hampshire Post and Southsea Observer reported that May Yates had described a WVU campaign to promote "reformed cooking". The campaign included house-to-house visits, instruction on nutrition and food preparation, and efforts to make vegetable foods more available through ordinary trade channels.

=== Practical support services ===
By 1897, the WVU had established a Vegetarian Depot to supply vegetarian goods, and a General Agency Department intended to match vegetarian employers and employees and provide information related to vegetarianism and hygiene. For the period March 1896 to March 1897, the WVU reported income of £34.40 and expenditure of £30.75. Over the same period, its General Agency Department reported receipts of £5.10 and expenses of £3.60.

=== Other campaigns ===
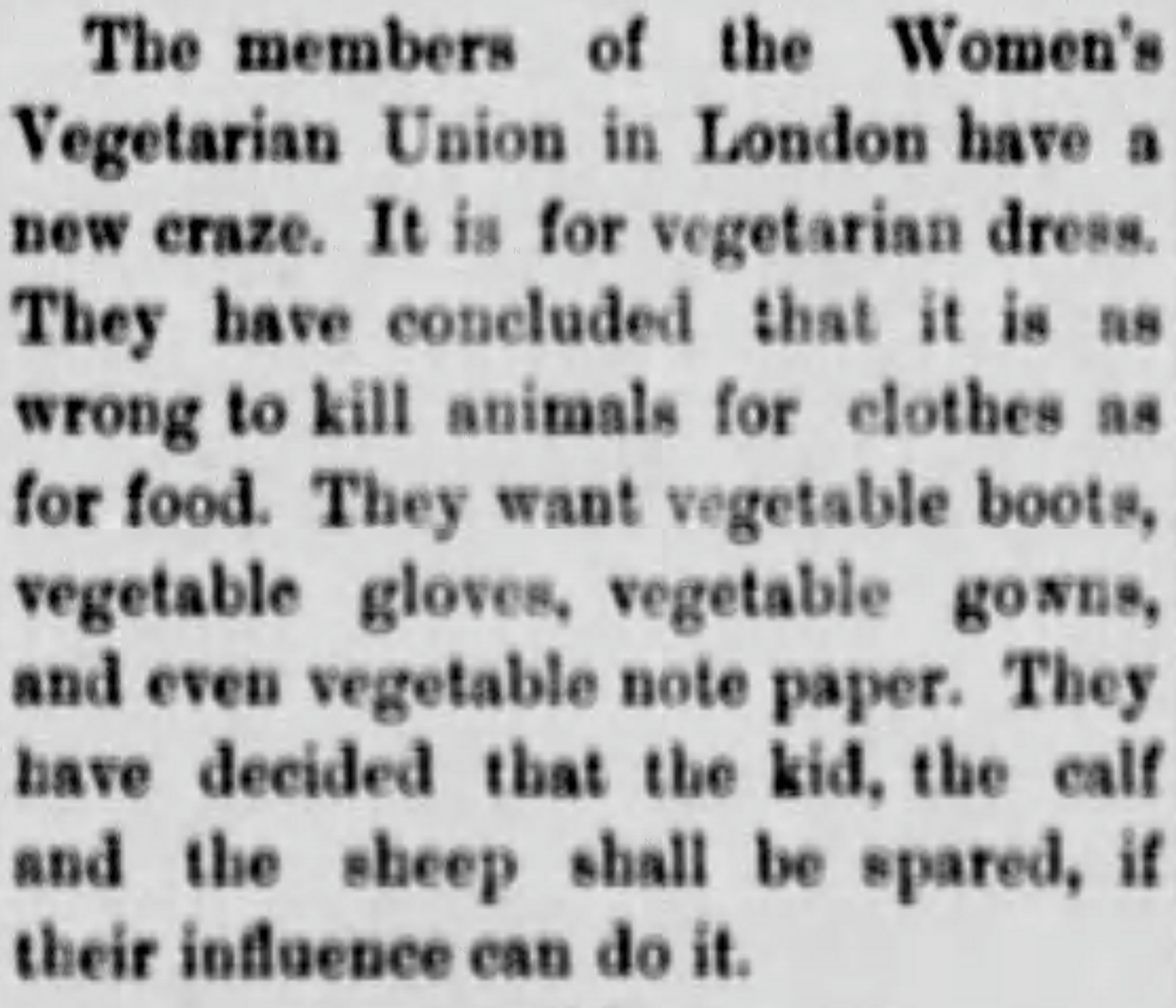
The Perry County Democrat on the WVU and "vegetarian dress"

In 1897, an American newspaper reported that members were advocating "vegetarian dress", arguing against the use of animal products in clothing and related goods.

== Reception ==
The organisation was reported in feminist periodicals including Shafts and The Woman's Signal. It was also mocked in some mainstream press coverage. The North China Herald, while reporting the union's plans for animal-free clothing and household goods, described its aims as "manifold and curious" and argued that excluding "animal assistance" from one's surroundings was unnecessary. In January 1905, Pearson's Weekly referred to the union's house-to-house canvassing campaign in a brief item headed "Will Roast Beef Disappear?", stating that it aimed to persuade working men to give up roast beef.

== Reports ==
The WVU published the following reports:

- First Annual Report (1895–96)
- Second Annual Report (1896–97)
- Third Annual Report (1897–98)
- Fifth Annual Report (1899–1900; international)
- Sixth Annual Report (1900–1901; international)

== See also ==
- History of vegetarianism
- Women and vegetarianism and veganism advocacy
- Vegetarianism in the Victorian era
- Verein Vegetarischer Frauen
