= Charles W. Crawford (Royal Navy officer) =

British Royal Navy officer

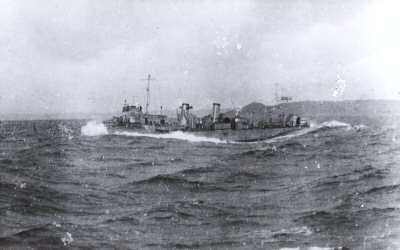
Her Majesty's Torpedo Boat 107, launched 1900 or 1901, that was to come under the command of Crawford

Captain Charles Wispington Glover Crawford, CBE (1873 – 16 October 1934) was a British Royal Navy officer who commanded the Devonport flotilla of motor torpedo boats. In his spare time, he was a noted philatelist. He signed the Roll of Distinguished Philatelists in 1934.

== Naval career ==
Crawford was educated for a naval career and joined the Britannia at Dartmouth in 1886. He became a midshipman on HMS Northumberland in 1888 and later that same year joined HMS Canada at Bermuda. In 1893 he became lieutenant, and in March 1900, he was posted as lieutenant and torpedo officer to the protected cruiser HMS Highflyer, flag ship of the East Indies Station. In the middle of 1902 he was promoted to first lieutenant, still serving on the Highflyer. He subsequently attained the rank of commander and in 1905 was given the command of a Royal Navy motor torpedo boat HMTB 107 launched in 1901. Crawford was also given command of the Devonport flotilla of the 160 footer torpedo boats.

He travelled widely and was in charge of wireless telegraphy in Somaliland in actions against Mohammed Abdullah Hassan, known as the "Mad Mullah" by the British. He retired in 1910 but was recalled to active service on the outbreak of the First World War. He was involved with the landing of the naval division at Dunkirk and the evacuation of Ostend for which he was mentioned in dispatches. In 1919, he was awarded the honour of being made a commander of the order of the British Empire in recognition of his work during the war.

== Philately ==
Crawford first became interested in stamps as a boy and formed a collection with his step-father. During his naval career he often sent stamps home from the various ports that he visited. His philatelic interests were broad but he was a particular expert on the stamps of the Australian States and New Zealand. He was elected to the Royal Philatelic Society London in June 1918 and was a member of their Expert Committee. He was convenor of the Queensland Reference List Committee who were charged with reporting on the papers, perforations and plates of that territory.

== Death ==
Crawford died at his home in Seaford on 16 October 1934 after having suffered two heart attacks in August of that year. He was buried at Morden Cemetery on 19 October and was survived by his wife.

== Selected publications ==
- "Reflections on Modern Philately." The Eighth Philatelic Congress.
- "Perforation Varieties of Victoria and their Arrangement." Stanley Gibbons Monthly Journal, Vol. XX, p. 127.
- " Perforations of the 1898-1910 Issues of China." Stanley Gibbons Monthly Journal, Vol. XX, p. 369.
- "The Flaw Varieties of the Electrotyped Issues of Queensland." The London Philatelist, Vol. XXIX, page 191.
- "New Zealand: The 1/2d. 'Newspaper Postage' Stamp, 1873–95." Stanley Gibbons Monthly Journal, Vol. XXIII, p. 120.
- "Introductory Notes to the 1906-08 Provisional Issues of Nicaragua." The London Philatelist, Vol. XXXVI, p. 56.
- "South Australia. The Is. olive-yellow, 1862." The London Philatelist, Vol. XXXIV, p. 193.
- "The Watermarked Papers used for the New Zealand 1/2d. Stamp, inscribed ' Newspaper Postage.' " The London Philatelist, Vol. XXXIX, p. 84.
