= Minta Beach =

American long distance walker

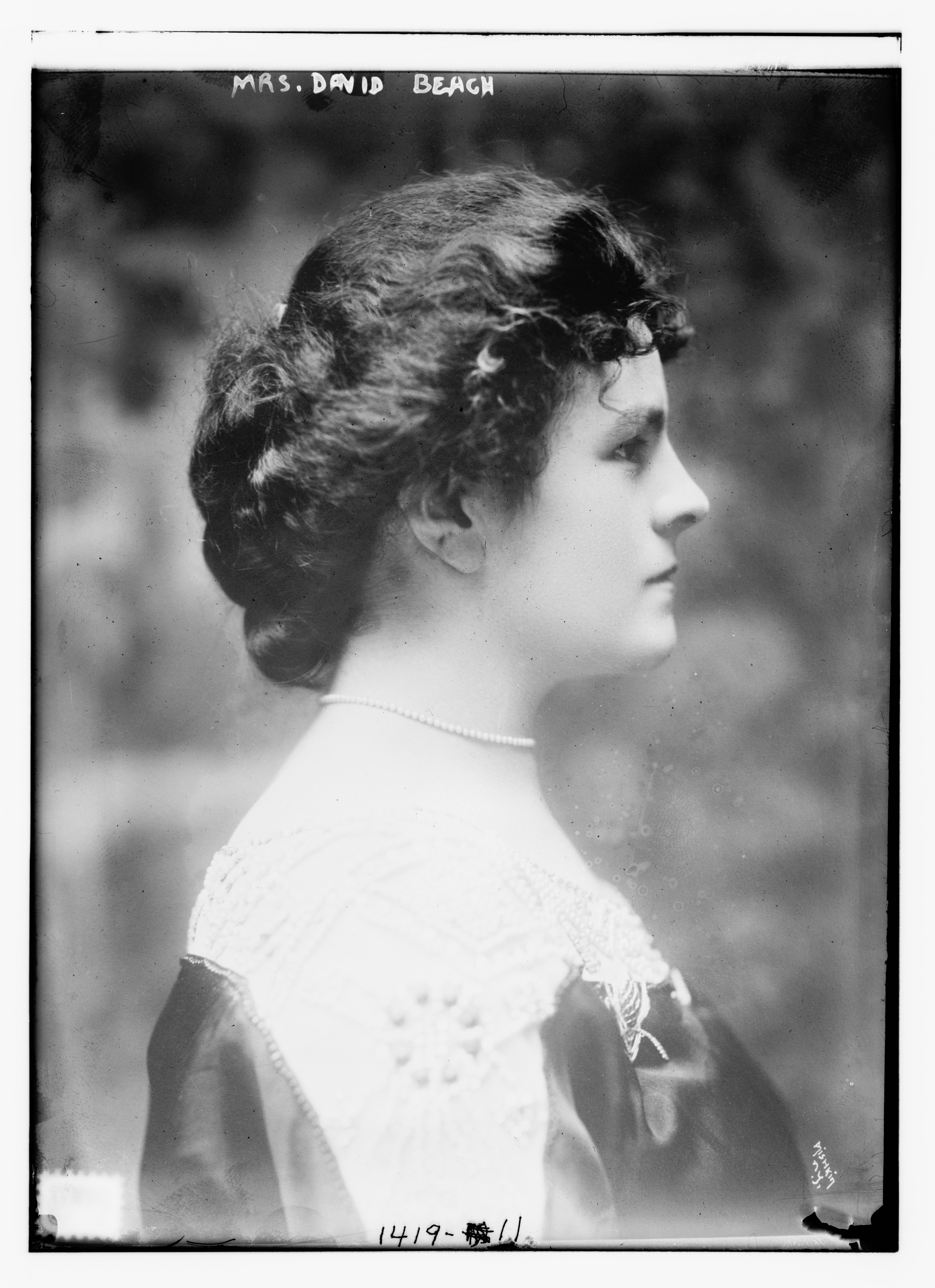
- Beach in 1900
- Born: Minta Asha Philips Beach; 1875
- Died: 11 April 1961 (aged 85–86); Sheffield, Massachusetts, U.S.
- Occupation: Activist

Minta Asha Philips Beach (1875 – 11 April 1961) known as Mrs. David Beach was an American suffragette, long distance walker and music teacher who campaigned for vegetarianism.

== Long distance walk ==
In April 1912, Beach embarked on a long-distance walk from New York City to Chicago to prove that hard labour could be performed on a raw vegetarian diet and that women had the stamina to complete such a feat. Beach received coaching lessons from Edward Payson Weston.

Her walk was widely covered by newspapers including the Chicago Daily News and The New York Globe. Both newspapers had sponsored the walk. She left New York City on April 10, 1912 heading north to Albany and then west to Chicago on roads and railroad tracks. A limousine followed her with a chauffeur, maid and representative of the sponsoring newspapers. She was greeted by many cheering crowds and spent her nights in hotels. In May 1912, she commented that she aimed "to educate the people to the right way of taking care of their bodies" and gave many interviews on vegetarianism. She described herself as a "vigorous suffragist" but avoided carrying a votes for women banner to avoid detraction from her vegetarian message.

She consumed two vegetarian meals a day consisting of fruit, uncooked vegetables, grains and nuts. For example, on May 1 she consumed an orange, two grated apples, raw ground wheat and a glass of milk for lunch and a lettuce salad, glass of milk mixed with two eggs and juice of a lemon for dinner. On May 11 she was a guest at Cleveland Athletic Club who served her a vegetarian dinner. By May 3, Beach had removed dairy products and eggs from her diet. She commented that "I have not missed milk or eggs in the least". Her diet consisted of apples, bananas, figs, prunes, raisins, fruit juice, uncooked grains, olive oil, salad and lemons. On May 14 at a hotel in Lorain she was served a dandelion and onion salad, banana souffle and fruit juice. She arrived in Chicago on May 28 with her husband awaiting her. She completed the 1071 mile walk in 42 and a half days with an average of 25 to 30 miles a day. Beach authored a book about the merits of a vegetarian diet, describing her walk. It was published as My Walk from New York to Chicago in 1914.

== Personal life ==
Beach became a vegetarian in 1904. She did not drink water over fear of germs and preferred fruit juice. She argued against meat consumption which she associated with cancer. She was married to a broker in the metropolis who was also a vegetarian. In 1924, Beach was working as a concert singer. Beach managed the Little School of Applied Music in New York City which moved to the Berkshires in 1937. She had a summer home at Windsor. Her daughter was Barbara Beach Schmitz of New York City.

She died at Sheffield, Massachusetts in 1961, aged 86.

== Selected publications ==
- My Walk from New York to Chicago. New York: Beach Publishing Company. 1914.

== Gallery ==
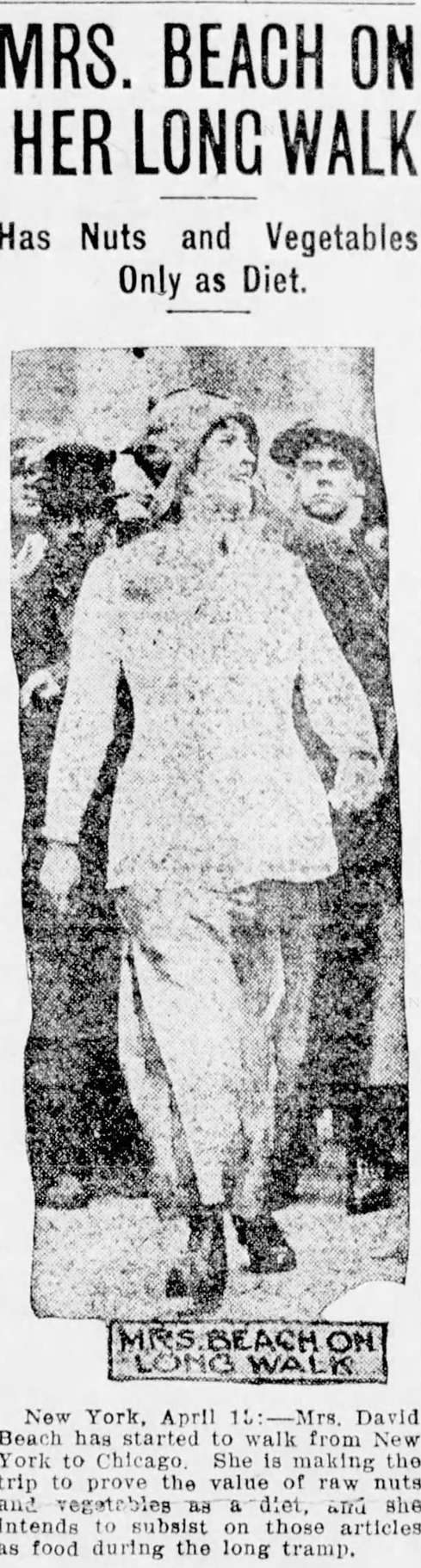
"Mrs. Beach on Her Long Walk", April 15, 1912

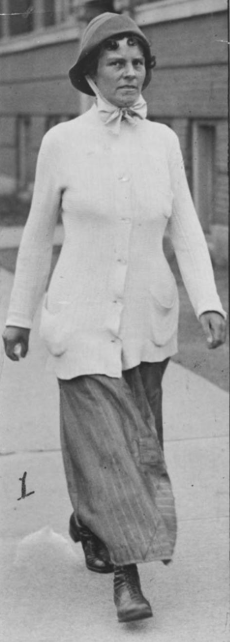
Beach on Michigan Avenue, May 29, 1912
