= Henry Ernest Tanner =

Canadian politician

Henry Ernest Tanner (1868 – June 24, 1940) was an English-born farmer and political figure in British Columbia. He represented Saanich in the Legislative Assembly of British Columbia from 1903 until his retirement in the 1907 provincial election as a Liberal.

Tanner came to South Saanich by way of California, arriving around 1891. He served as first president of the local Fruit Growers Association and was also an active member of the local temperance society. He died in Victoria at the age of 72.
