= Alvenia Fulton =

American nutritionist and naturopath

Alvenia Moody Fulton (May 17, 1906 – March 5, 1999) was an American nutritionist and naturopath.

== Early life and career ==
Fulton was born on May 17, 1906, in Pulaski, Tennessee, where her parents owned a 156-acre farm. Her parents, Richard and Mahala Moody, practiced alternative medicine using roots and herbs found in nearby forests. In her early life, she took jobs as a practical nurse, a schoolteacher, and a midwife, but she later enrolled at Tennessee State Normal College and decided to become a minister. Fulton went to Greater Payne Theological Seminary in Birmingham, Alabama, becoming the first woman to attend and graduate from that school. One of the first female members of the A.M.E. Church's Northern Alabama Conference, she pastored three churches. By the beginning of the 1950s, she had moved to Chicago, Illinois.

== Nutrition and naturopathy ==
Fulton spent decades in poor health, and in 1954 she was hospitalized on two occasions: once for bleeding duodenal ulcers and once for uterine fibroid tumors. Deciding that conventional medical treatments were ineffective, she began to attend lectures by Paul Bragg, Gayelord Hauser, and others on the topics of nutrition and naturopathy. She stated that consuming raw cabbage juice (as suggested by Stanford's Garnett Cheney) cured her ulcers and that fasting (as recommended by lecturer Max O. Garten) cured her tumors. Seeking to tell others about the effects of good nutrition, she left the ministry and, in 1955, opened the Pioneer Natural Health Center in her Chicago home. In 1957, she opened a store, which she named the Fultonia Health Food and Fasting Center, on 63rd Street. The store sold restaurant items, such as salads, soups, juices, and vegetarian chili, as well as potions mixed by Fulton and herb and vitamin pills. According to naturopath Eileen Silva, it was a "homespun kitchen that exploded all over the place".

Fulton's store served mostly members of the local community and garnered little attention until 1966. In that year, she sent Dick Gregory, who was at the time running a write-in campaign against Richard J. Daley in the Chicago mayoral election, what he described as an "unsolicited container of funny-looking salad". At first, he was afraid that the salad had been laced with arsenic and sent by Daley to poison him, but upon realizing that it was a promotional gimmick by Fulton, he and his wife visited her at her store and had a consultation with her. Gregory became her most noteworthy client; she taught him fasting techniques that he later used as part of various political protests. Other prominent clients of Fulton's were Bill Walton, Ben Vereen, and Roberta Flack. She authored Vegetarianism: Fact or Myth (1974), Fasting Made Simple (1979), and, with Gregory, Dick Gregory's Natural Diet for Folks Who Eat (1973); she also hosted a radio show on WVON, gave lectures on college campuses, and appeared on television.

== Later life and death ==
Fulton continued working into her 90s. In 1992, part of West 63rd Street was named Dr. Alvenia Fulton Drive in her honor. She died March 5, 1999, at the age of 92 in Chicago's Holy Cross Hospital. In a 2019 article, Travis A. Weisse described Fulton as "the pioneering advocate of therapeutic fasting and corrective nutrition in black America", writing that she "performed critical cultural labor by translating ideas from the overwhelmingly white alternative medical community—and subsequently the natural health food movement—for an urban black audience".
