= William Tibbles =

British physician and health writer (1859–1928)

William Tibbles (1859 - February 1928) was a British physician and health writer.

Tibbles was born in Leicester. He received his LRCP (1881) and MRCS (1889) from Charing Cross Hospital where he worked as a pathological assistant. He worked as a medical officer for the Melton Mowbray Rural District and Nottingham District Union. During 1915-1919 he was assistant physician at Nottingham General Hospital.

Tibbles authored books on dietetics which were positively reviewed by the medical community. He received honorary degrees, LL.D (1895) and M.D. (1907) from University of Chicago and D.C.L. (1904) from University of Washington. Tibbles was a Freemason.

== Publications ==
- Food and Hygiene: An Elementary Treatise Upon Dietetics and Hygienic Treatment (1907)
- The Theory of Ions: A Consideration of its Place in Biology and Therapeutics (1909)
- Foods: Their Origin, Composition and Manufacture (1912)
- Diet in Dyspepsia and Other Diseases of the Stomach and Bowels (1913)
- Dietetics: Or Food in Health and Disease (1914)
- Life and Evolution (1927)
