= Mary Corkling =

English painter and food reformer (1850–1938)

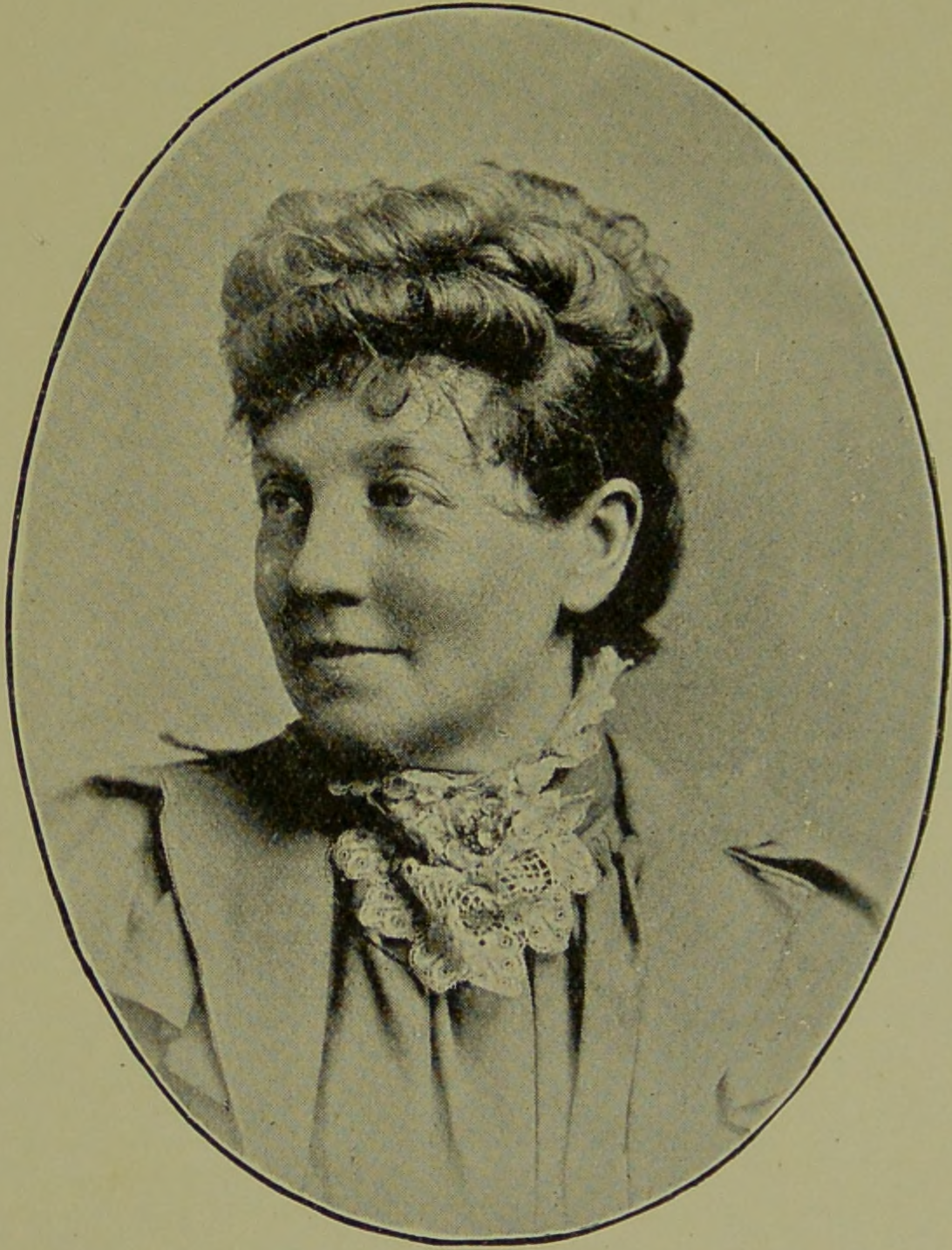
- Corkling in Fifty Years of Food Reform (1898)
- Born: Mary Ann Yates Corkling; 18 May 1850; Withington, Manchester, England
- Died: 30 May 1938 (aged 88); London, England
- Other name: May Yates
- Occupations: Painter; food reformer
- Organizations: Bread Reform League; London Vegetarian Society; Women's Vegetarian Union

Mary Ann Yates Corkling (18 May 1850 – 30 May 1938), also known as May Yates, was an English painter and food reformer. She campaigned for wholemeal bread, vegetarianism and temperance, and was associated with the Bread Reform League, the London Vegetarian Society and the Women's Vegetarian Union.

== Biography ==
=== Early life ===
Corkling was born in Withington, Manchester, to Mary Anne Corkling (née Booth) and Robert Yates Corkling, a cashier and aspiring merchant.

According to Ellen Creathorne Clayton, Corkling's parents were concerned by her severe myopia and she was excused from drawing at school to avoid straining her eyes. After she copied a painting and drew from life, her ability was recognised and she enrolled at Dudley School of Art. The family later moved to a house where her work could be encouraged, and she was sent to Sicily for further practice.

=== Painting ===
Corkling mainly painted flowers and figures. She exhibited with the Society of Lady Artists in 1875, and in 1878 had a painting shown at the Royal Academy.

=== Food reform ===
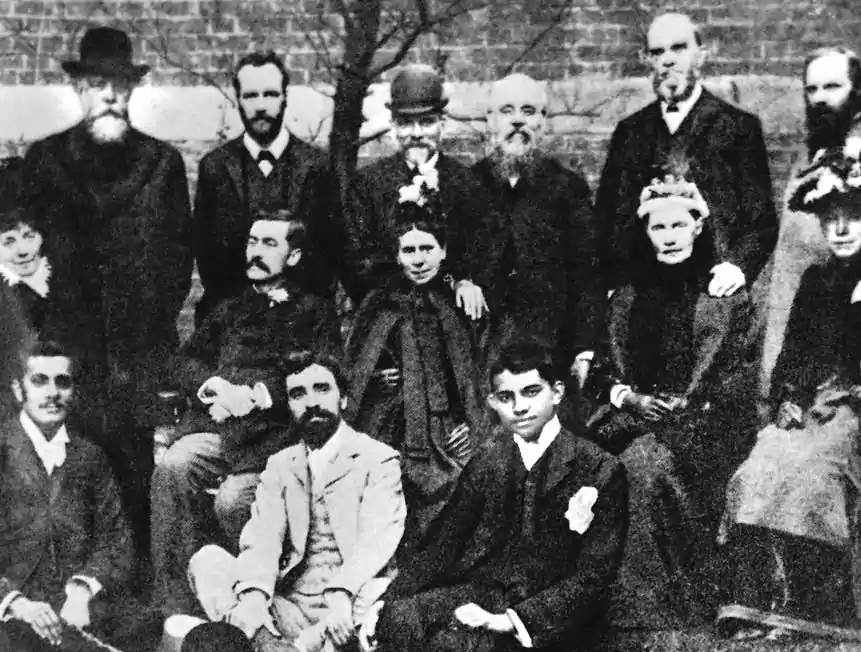
Corkling (middle, far left) at a meeting of the London Vegetarian Society, 1891

Corkling's membership of the Ladies' Sanitary Association was followed by work in food reform.

While in Sicily, Corkling associated the health of local peasants with the brown bread they ate. She sold jewellery to fund efforts to promote brown bread in Manchester. In 1880, she founded the Bread Reform League at Kensington Town Hall and became its leader. At her parents' request, she used the name May Yates because they considered public work unsuitable for a woman of the Corkling family. T. H. Huxley and others supported the campaign.

Corkling wrote about the claimed advantages of brown bread, and other women volunteered as lecturers for the Bread Reform League. The league had little money, and Corkling used her own income to fund pamphlets. Her interest in food reform led her to vegetarianism. She was secretary of the London Vegetarian Society from 1890 to 1893.

The Bread Reform League later merged with the London Vegetarian Society. Corkling promoted whole grains and vegetarianism, and opposed alcohol and white bread. Nico Slate writes that she influenced Mahatma Gandhi's support for the whole grain movement.

In 1890, writing as Yates, she read The Staff of Life at the 2nd International Vegetarian Congress. The paper was published in The Vegetarian Messenger in 1891 and criticised the views of Emmet Densmore.

Around the same period, Corkling travelled to Belgium and lectured in French. In 1895, she led the formation of a food reform department within the World's Woman's Christian Temperance Union, and became a full vegetarian. She argued that humans had obligations to other animals, and in 1901 briefly led the Women's Vegetarian Union.

In 1894, Corkling lectured on vegetarianism in New Zealand. She described meat-eating as "opposed to the highest ideal of humanity, which is horrified at the thought of our daily food being associated with the bloodshed, cruelty, and death inseparably connected with the slaughter-house". She also wrote a pamphlet giving twelve reasons for vegetarianism.

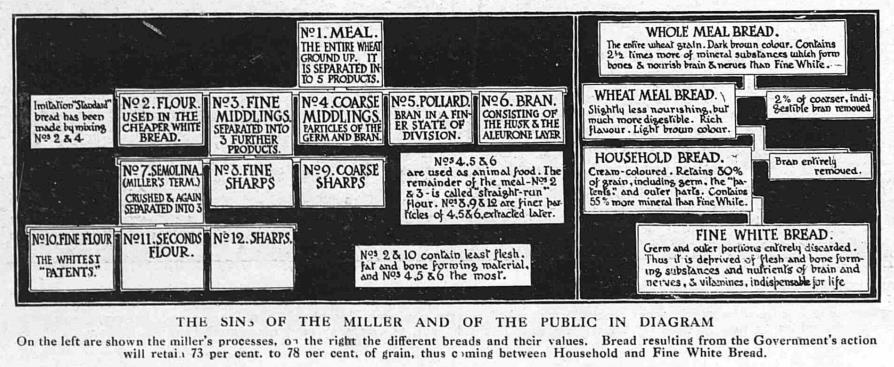
"The Sins of the Miller" in 1916

Wholemeal bread later received support from the Daily Mail and Lyons teashops. In 1916, Corkling wrote in The Graphic about white bread and milling. During the First World War, the introduction of "war bread" drew on recipes that Corkling had supplied. In 1932, she received a government grant in recognition of her food reform work.

=== Death ===
Corkling died in London on 30 May 1938, aged 88.

== Publications ==
- "The Staff of Life: A Refutation of Dr. Densmore". The Vegetarian Messenger: 35–42. 1891.
- Vegetarianism the Final Solution of the Drink Question. 1894.

== See also ==
- History of vegetarianism
- Women and vegetarianism and veganism advocacy
- Women in the Victorian era
- Temperance movement in the United Kingdom
- Vegetarianism in the United Kingdom
- Vegetarianism in the Victorian era
