= Women and vegetarianism and veganism advocacy =

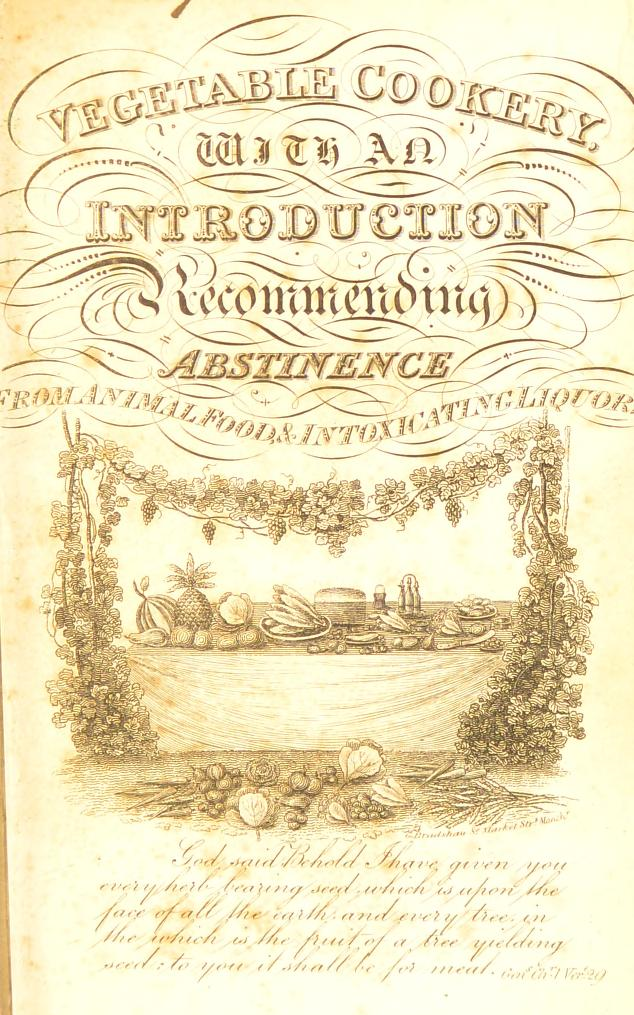
Title page of Martha Brotherton's Vegetable Cookery (1812), described as the first vegetarian cookbook

Women and vegetarianism and veganism advocacy concerns women's participation in the promotion of vegetarian and vegan diets. The topic includes women's roles in religious and social reform circles, suffrage activism, cookery writing, vegetarian restaurants, animal advocacy, anti-vivisection, and later ecofeminist and vegan studies literature. Sources on the subject have examined ethical, health, temperance, domestic-labour, environmental and spiritual arguments for meat-free diets, as well as gender differences in adoption and attitudes.

== History ==
=== Pre-1800s ===
Meat-avoidant practices predated organised modern vegetarian movements. The National Park Service notes examples including Indigenous foodways in parts of North America and religious abstention on the Indian subcontinent, which later campaigners in Anglophone vegetarian movements drew on or reinterpreted.

=== 1800s ===
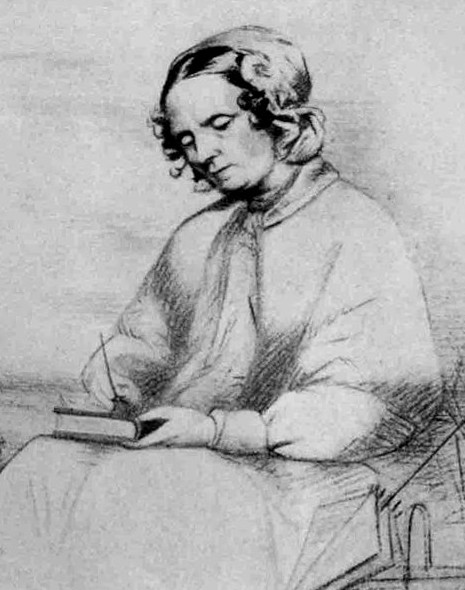
Asenath Hatch Nicholson (1792–1855), early American vegetarian advocate

Women were active in nineteenth-century vegetarian and animal welfare circles, often in connection with other social reform movements and periodical publishing.

In Britain, Martha Brotherton, a member of the Bible Christian Church, a Christian sect that advocated temperance and a meat-free diet, published Vegetable Cookery (1812). It has been described as the first explicitly vegetarian cookbook. Kathryn Gleadle and other historians have argued that the book helped early nineteenth-century Americans adopt vegetarianism and influenced later vegetarian cookbooks.

In the United States, Asenath Hatch Nicholson promoted meat-free cookery after hearing Sylvester Graham lecture. She and her husband operated a vegetarian boarding house in New York City, and she published Nature's Own Book (1835) and A Treatise on Vegetable Diet (1848). The Transcendentalist community Fruitlands (1843) adopted a vegan regimen that excluded animal products and some crops. Louisa May Alcott's later account drew attention to the domestic labour expected of women at the community, which disbanded within months. In 1850, the American Vegetarian Society associated abstention from meat with other reforms. Its journal connected vegetarianism with women's rights and abolition, and reformers including Susan B. Anthony attended vegetarian society events.

The physician and spiritualist Anna Kingsford (1846–1888) argued in The Perfect Way in Diet (1881) for meat abstention on anatomical, health, ethical and spiritual grounds. Ruby Ekkel writes that Kingsford connected vegetarianism with women's emancipation, anti-vivisection and Theosophical ideas of social and moral reform.

==== 1890s–1928 (British suffrage era) ====
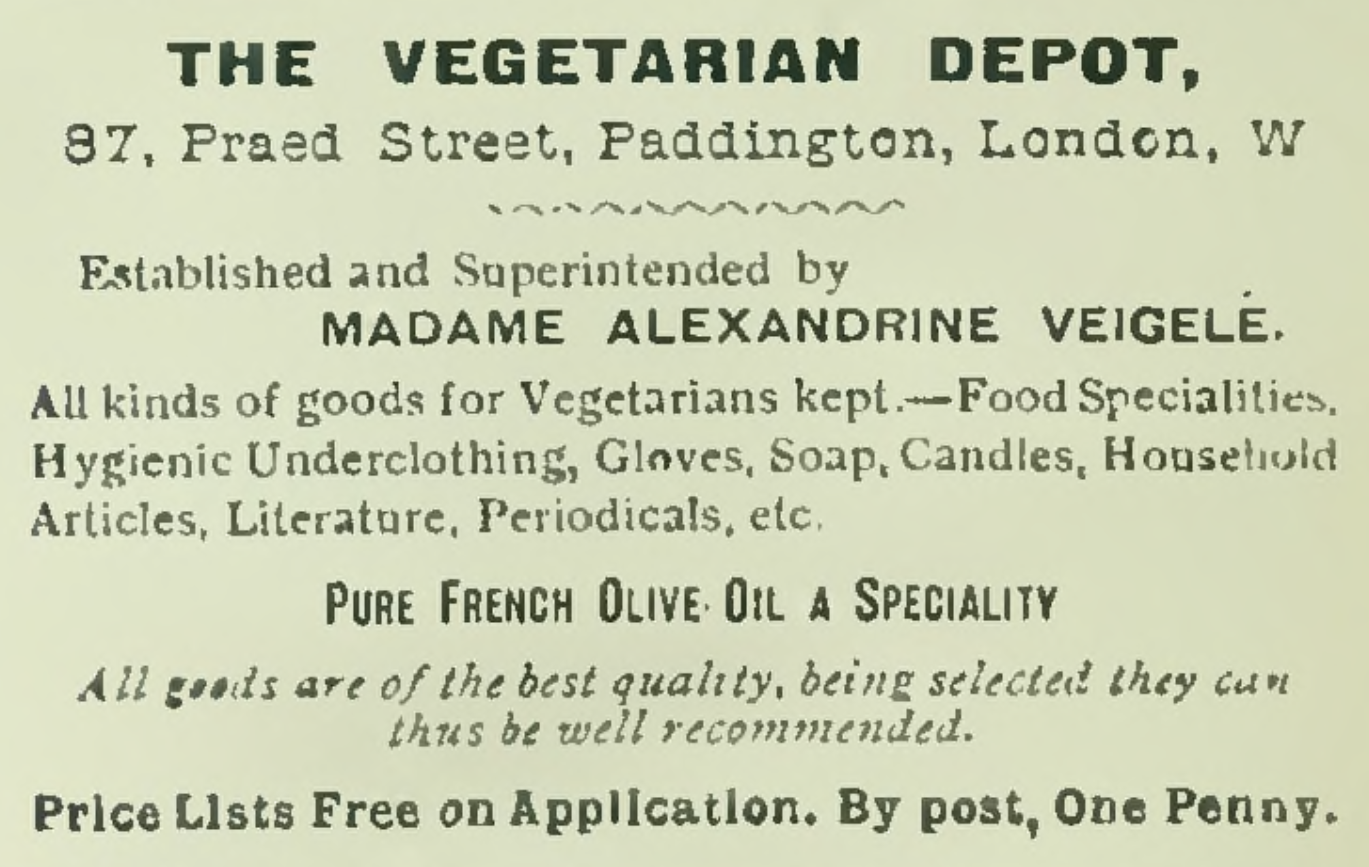
1899 advertisement for the Women's Vegetarian Union's Vegetarian Depot, founded by Alexandrine Veigele, supplying meat-free provisions and household goods.

Leah Leneman's study of Britain during the suffrage era found that vegetarianism appeared in both militant and constitutional suffrage circles. She describes suffrage branch events, wartime vegetarian kitchens, and cooperation between suffrage groups and local vegetarian societies.

Elsa Richardson writes that vegetarian restaurants in Edwardian London, including the Eustace Miles Restaurant in Charing Cross, the Gardenia in Covent Garden, the Criterion in Piccadilly and the Teacup Inn off Kingsway, were used by suffrage supporters for meetings, lectures and meals. Richardson states that a suffrage procession on 4 April 1908 ended with a breakfast at the Eustace Miles Restaurant, and that the restaurant later refused to give the authorities information about patrons. She also describes these restaurants as alcohol-free or otherwise suitable for unaccompanied women diners. The Minerva Cafe in High Holborn, established by the Women's Freedom League in 1916 under president Charlotte Despard, was used as a headquarters and fundraising site; according to Richardson, it marked the 1918 franchise reform with a vegetarian menu. Richardson connects these venues with earlier initiatives such as the Women's Vegetarian Union (1895) and with periodicals including Shafts, which associated meat abstention with women's rights, anti-vivisection, rational dress and education.

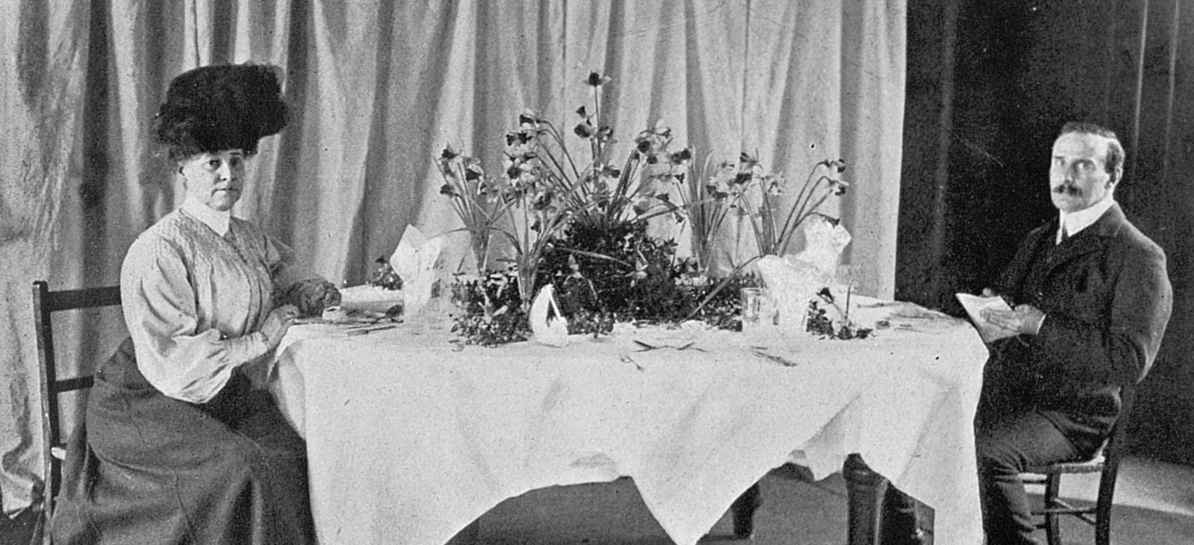
Hallie and Eustace Miles at their vegetarian restaurant, Charing Cross, 1907. Both were vegetarian advocates; Hallie also campaigned for women's rights and animal rights.

Richardson also reports that suffrage hunger strikers were received after release at public breakfasts at the Eustace Miles Restaurant, where medals were presented beginning with Marion Wallace Dunlop. In her account, food practices and opposition to force-feeding were used in suffrage arguments about bodily autonomy.

Helen Antrobus discusses WSPU "Welcome Breakfasts" at the Eustace Miles Restaurant and cites a 1907 note in the Vegetarian Society's journal that "quite a number of the leaders in the Women's Suffragist movement are vegetarians". The Society's article also discusses suffragists and suffragettes who adopted vegetarian diets, prison diet requests including Constance Lytton's case, and figures such as Anne Cobden-Sanderson and Leonora Cohen.

=== 1900s ===
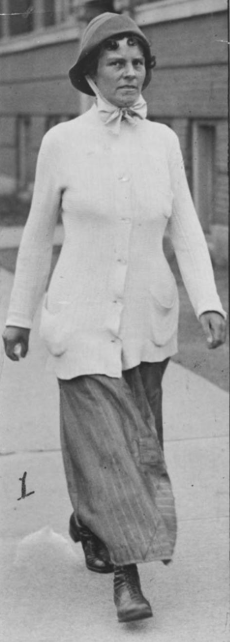
Minta Beach, the "vegetarian pedestrian", during her 1912 New York–Chicago walk on a raw vegetarian diet

In 1910, Martha Förster founded the Verein Vegetarischer Frauen ("Association of Vegetarian Women") in Dresden, Germany.

In 1912, suffragist Minta Beach undertook a New York–Chicago walk while following a vegetarian raw-food diet and addressed audiences about diet and women's physical capability. Contemporary coverage described her meals and presented the walk as a test of health and endurance.

Later in the century, nutritionist Alvenia Fulton ran the Fultonia Health Food Center in Chicago, promoted fasting and vegetarian eating, and advised civil-rights activist Dick Gregory during hunger strikes; the National Park Service states that Gregory ended a 54-day fast with a vegetarian meal at Fulton's centre.

=== 2000s–present ===
Social-psychological research from the 2000s onward has examined gender differences in vegetarian and vegan uptake. Reporting on this research has discussed "precarious masculinity", marketing that associates meat with masculinity, and different responses to the "meat paradox". Some studies have found that women are more likely to dissociate meat from animals, while men are more likely to justify meat eating as natural or necessary. Other work has discussed higher female participation in animal rights groups and stronger pro-meat reactions among some men when reminded of animals, with social-dominance explanations proposed for these findings.

== Demographics and attitudes ==
Surveys and commentaries have reported gender differences in engagement with vegetarianism and veganism. A 2020 systematic review of 29 studies reported consistent sex differences across multiple countries. It found that women in Western societies were about twice as likely as men to identify as vegetarian or vegan, that vegetarian diets were stereotyped as less masculine than meat-based diets, and that omnivores showed more prejudice towards vegetarian men than vegetarian women. The review also reported more positive attitudes towards meat consumption among men. A 15-year study of students at a US university (2008–2023) reported an increase in self-identified vegetarianism among women, from 4.3% to 8.7%, but not among men, where the figure changed from 3.2% to 2.7%. The authors discussed cultural and identity-based explanations for the different trends.

== Motivations and frameworks ==
Reported motivations for women's adoption of vegetarian or vegan diets include ethical objections to animal killing, reductions in domestic labour time, health and temperance arguments, environmental concerns, and religious or spiritual considerations. Reviews of gendered motivations discuss women's greater concern for animal welfare and health, men's stronger endorsement of rationalisations for meat eating, and gendered stereotypes around food and masculinity.

== Intersection with feminism ==
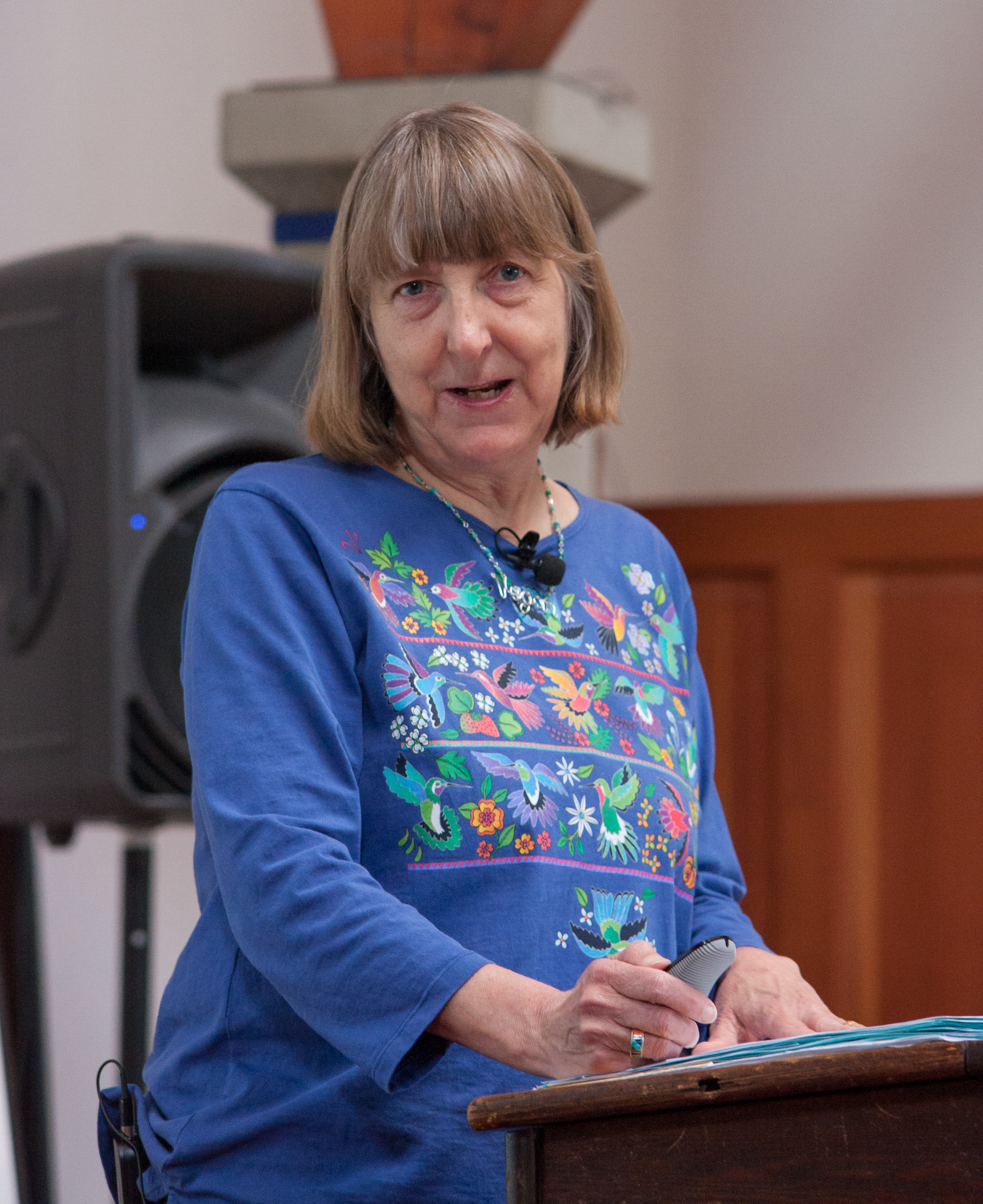
Carol J. Adams, ecofeminist theorist and author of The Sexual Politics of Meat, known for the "absent referent" concept

=== First wave ===
Analyses of Edwardian Britain discuss arguments that vegetarianism could reduce domestic labour, avoid participation in animal killing, and question gender hierarchies. Leneman also describes connections with Theosophy and socialism, where vegetarianism was linked to ideas of universal kinship. Kingsford connected anti-vivisection and vegetarianism with women's emancipation, described women as protectors of animals, and argued that meatless cookery could reduce household labour and costs.

=== Second wave and later debates ===
Later writing connected critiques of meat eating with gender, sexuality and environmental harm. Examples include Carol J. Adams's The Sexual Politics of Meat (1990), Feminists for Animal Rights, and interview and essay literature on care-centred approaches.

==== Vegetarian ecofeminism ====
Vegetarian ecofeminism refers to approaches that connect the subordination of women with the exploitation of non-human animals and critique meat eating as part of patriarchal power relations. Concepts in this literature include the "absent referent", meaning the erasure of the animal in meat consumption, and an ethic of care that treats emotional response as a basis for moral reasoning. Reviews of this literature place vegetarian ecofeminism within wider ecofeminist thought on sexism, racism, classism and speciesism.

== Organisations and campaigns ==
Women's groups in the United Kingdom ran vegetarian restaurants during the First World War and worked with local vegetarian societies on demonstrations and lectures. Secondary sources also identify the Eustace Miles Restaurant and the Minerva Cafe as venues for suffrage lectures, headquarters work and fundraising. In the United States, early examples included women-run vegetarian boarding houses and cafes associated with reform advocacy. Antrobus describes vegetarian restaurants as sites for suffrage events and fundraising, and notes contemporary arguments based on peace, economy and household labour. In nineteenth-century American vegetarian organisations, dietary reform was also linked with women's rights and abolition through conventions and publications.

== Notable advocates ==
- Asenath Hatch Nicholson, early American promoter of vegetarian cookery who operated a vegetarian boarding house and published Nature's Own Book (1835) and A Treatise on Vegetable Diet (1848).
- Charlotte Despard, president of the Women's Freedom League, associated with the vegetarian Minerva Cafe in London.
- Constance Lytton, suffragette whose prison diet requests during force-feeding were reported in contemporary accounts.
- Anne Cobden-Sanderson, suffragist associated with vegetarian reform through the National Food Reform Association and author of How I Became A Vegetarian.
- Leonora Cohen, suffragette associated with reform diets, later advertising catering for "Reform diets" at her boarding house.
- Marion Wallace Dunlop, suffragette hunger striker; post-release breakfasts at the Eustace Miles Restaurant included medal presentations beginning with her case.
- Alvenia Fulton, nutritionist and proprietor of the Fultonia Health Food Center in Chicago; advised Dick Gregory and promoted vegetarian eating.
- Minta Asha Philips Beach, suffragist who completed a 1912 New York–Chicago walk on a vegetarian raw-food regimen and lectured on diet.
- Susan B. Anthony, reformer who attended American vegetarian society events linking dietary reform with women's rights.
- Anna Kingsford, physician, spiritualist and advocate of vegetarianism and anti-vivisection who connected diet, women's emancipation and Theosophical social reform.

== Criticism and debates ==
Commentary on vegetarian and vegan advocacy has discussed class, race, disability and labour within advocacy cultures.

== In popular culture ==
In television, "Lisa the Vegetarian" (1995), an episode of The Simpsons, has been discussed for its portrayal of vegetarianism on mainstream US television. The episode follows Lisa's conversion after a petting-zoo visit, depicts backlash from meat-eaters, and features Paul and Linda McCartney, whose participation was conditional on Lisa remaining a vegetarian thereafter. The story has Lisa apologise for militant tactics while continuing to follow a vegetarian diet. The episode received an Environmental Media Award and a Genesis Award.

== See also ==
- Feminist ethics
- History of vegetarianism
- Vegan studies
- Women and animal advocacy
