= Henry S. Tanner (doctor) =

American homeopath

Henry Samuel Tanner
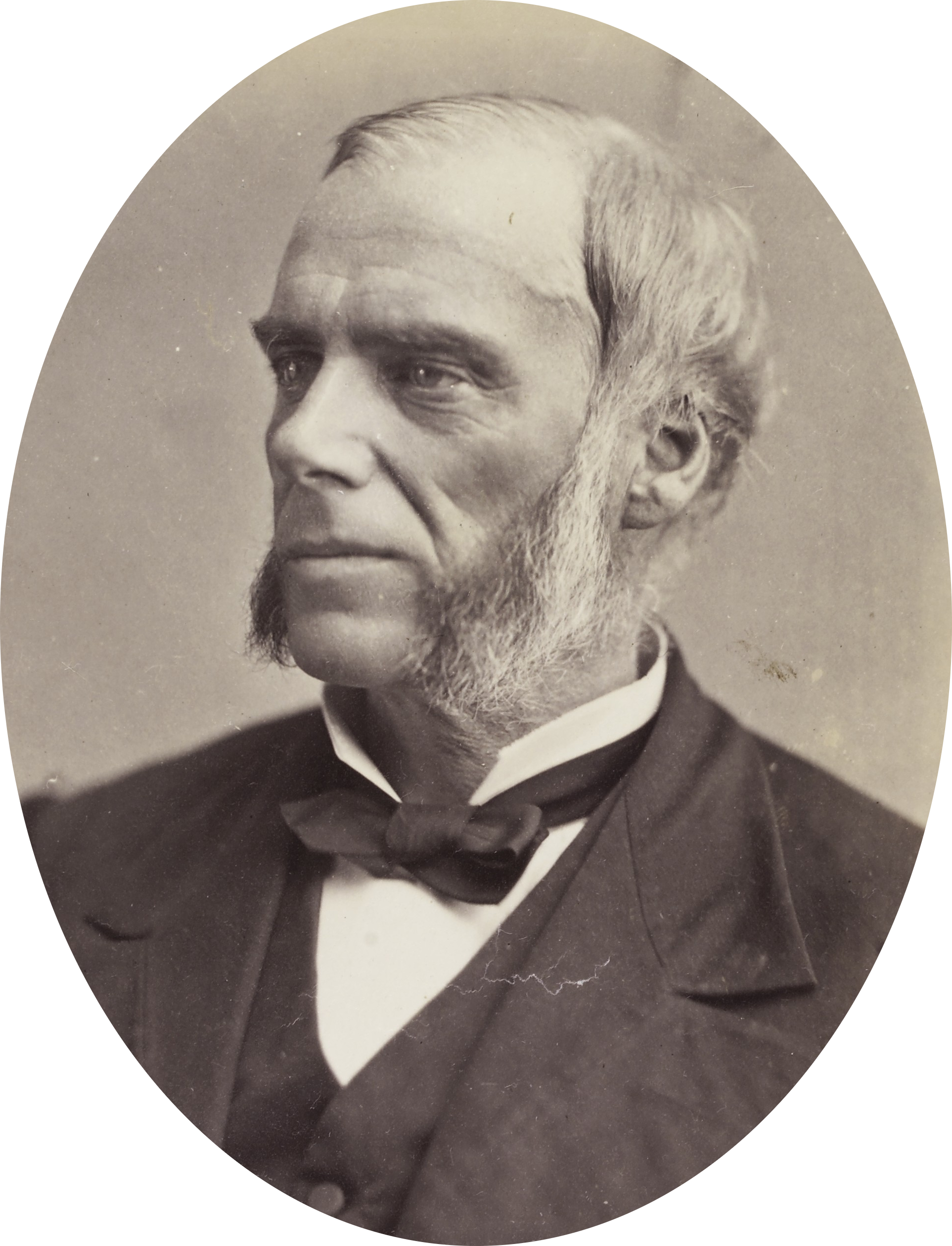
- Tanner in 1880
- Born: February 7, 1831; England
- Died: December 28, 1918 (aged 87); San Diego, California
- Occupation: homeopathic doctor
- Known for: His 40-day fast

Henry Samuel Tanner (February 7, 1831 - December 28, 1918) was an eclectic doctor who advocated fasting. He fasted for 40 days in Manhattan, New York City in 1880.

== Biography ==
He was born on February 7, 1831, in England to Hannah and Samuel Tanner. He was a graduate of the Eclectic Medical Institute in Cincinnati (class of 1859). He claimed to have completed a 42 day fast in 1879, but was unable to prove it. On June 28, 1880, he began a forty-day fast in Manhattan. His first meal after completing the fast was milk, watermelon, and half a pound of beefsteak. On his 81st birthday, in 1911 he proposed an 80 day fast in Los Angeles, California. He died on December 28, 1918, in San Diego, California.

== The fast ==
On June 28, 1880, Tanner began a forty days’ fast at Clarendon Hall in Manhattan. After originally intending to go without food or water, he was persuaded to drink, before going without water from the second to the tenth day. Tanner lost almost 40 pounds by the conclusion of the experiment, and against the advice of his doctors began consuming meat, fruits, wine and milk immediately after.

Because no one believed his claim that he had fasted for 42 days, in January 1880, Tanner, a practitioner of hygienic medicine, announced that he would repeat his experiment to show that humans can survive without food and would agree to submit himself to be placed “under the care of any medical society” that would provide adequate housing. On June 30, Tanner began his attempt to duplicate his 40-day fast and after the 6th day, The New York Times began a series of articles chronicling his day –to-day progress, each dispatch becoming more ominous in its anticipation that his death by starvation was imminent. As the twelfth night approached, a Times headline announced that “The End [was] Predicted to be at Hand”. But rather than deteriorating, by the twentieth day, Tanner’s condition improved and he “looked and acted better than ever”.

On August 7, the Times reported that a crowd of over 2,000 would witness Tanner break his 40-day fast at midnight. The usual admission price of 25 cents was raised to half a dollar, resulting in a box office take of over $2,000. The many doctors on hand still expected him to keel over though upon re-feeding and although he re-fed on milk (which today would be strongly discouraged) he suffered only minimal nausea and some vomiting. A few days later the Times began reporting on Tanner’s recovery, gaining back some of his weight and that by September 10, the “fasting doctor” had launched a lecture tour touting “starvation” as a cure for disease.

== Legacy ==
The fast has been the subject of many books and studies taken since 1880. His daily log of weight and physical condition were released to the public for further evaluation.

Tanner's fame in the coming decades was enough for Mark Twain to mention in passing, "I think that the Dr. Tanners and those others who go forty days without eating do it by resolutely keeping out the desire to eat, in the beginning, and that after a few hours the desire is discouraged and comes no more" in Following the Equator: A Journey Around the World in 1897.

== Selected publications ==
- The Human Body a Volume of Divine Revelations (1908)
