= The Children's Realm =

British children's vegetarian magazine (1906–1914)

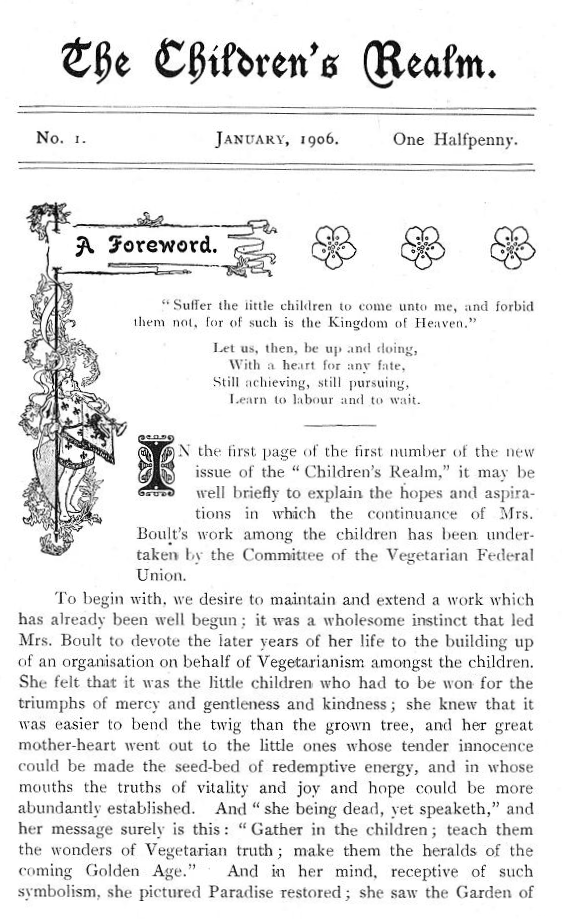
- Cover of the first issue, January 1906
- Editor: Florence I. Nicholson; A. M. Cole
- Categories: Children's literature, Vegetarianism
- Frequency: Monthly
- Publisher: Vegetarian Federal Union
- Founder: Arnold Hills
- First issue: January 1906; 120 years ago
- Final issue: September 1914; 112 years ago
- Country: United Kingdom of Great Britain and Ireland
- Based in: London
- Language: English
- OCLC: 503926328

The Children's Realm, subtitled A Journal to Teach the Higher Way of Living to the Young, was a British monthly children's magazine promoting vegetarianism and animal welfare, published in London by the Vegetarian Federal Union from January 1906 to September 1914. Founded by Arnold Hills following the closure of The Children's Garden (1900–1905), it was edited initially by Florence I. Nicholson and later by A. M. Cole. Although primarily intended for children, the magazine also addressed families and welcomed non-vegetarian readers.

The Children's Realm published fiction, poetry, essays, correspondence, recipes and reports from children's vegetarian societies. Alongside dietary reform and the treatment of animals, it addressed poverty, philanthropy and other social concerns. Its contributors included the artist and writer L. A. Hayter, the novelist Gerald Bullett and the freethinker and social reformer George Bedborough. The fruiterer W. B. Shearn also supported the magazine through competitions and events for children.

== History ==
=== Founding and editorship ===
The Children's Realm developed from the children's branch of the British vegetarian movement. During the late nineteenth century, vegetarian organisations began establishing societies and publishing periodicals for young readers. These included the Daisy Society's The Daisy Basket (1893–1894), edited by Joseph Knight, and the Ivy Leaf Society's The Children's Garden (1900–1905), founded by Frances L. Boult. Literary scholar Marzena Kubisz examines these publications as attempts to introduce children to vegetarian principles and encourage participation in the movement.

Following Boult's death in 1905, The Children's Garden ceased publication in December of that year. Arnold Hills, who was active in the London Vegetarian Society and the Vegetarian Federal Union, undertook to establish a successor. The first issue of The Children's Realm appeared in January 1906.

In the opening issue, Hills paid tribute to Boult's work and described children's vegetarian branches as a means of cultivating mercy, kindness and "higher humanity". He referred to their members as "little soldiers for the battle of good against wrong".

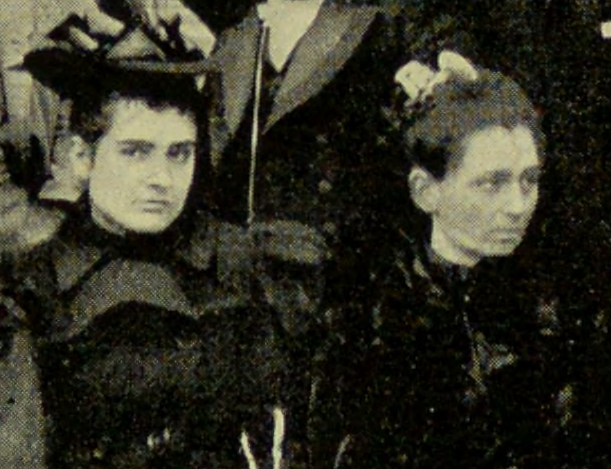
Florence I. Nicholson and A. M. Cole, successive editors of The Children's Realm

The magazine's first editor was Florence I. Nicholson, secretary of the Vegetarian Federal Union. In her New Year address, she called on readers to help establish the magazine and expand the "Children's Vegetarian Movement". Nicholson was subsequently succeeded by A. M. Cole.

The magazine was intended for family reading and encouraged participation by children who were not yet vegetarians. Its editors sometimes described non-vegetarians as "still labouring in the darkness of flesh-eating", while inviting them to consider adopting a vegetarian diet.

=== Circulation and closure ===
The editors regularly appealed to readers to increase subscriptions and promote the magazine. Early competitions offered prizes for obtaining new subscribers, including a copy of Eliza Brightwen's Wild Nature Won by Kindness. Further appeals appeared in 1908, when circulation remained below the editors' expectations.

Children were encouraged to ask newsagents to stock The Children's Realm and to introduce it to their schoolmates. A letter published in "Our Correspondence Column" in March 1910 described a schoolboy who displayed a copy on his classroom wall.

The magazine ceased publication following the outbreak of the First World War. According to Kubisz, the war disrupted children's vegetarian activities and contributed to financial difficulties for the publishers. In September 1914, Cole announced the suspension of The Children's Realm, describing it as an "excellent little messenger of humanity and sane diet".

== Contents ==
=== Vegetarianism and animal welfare ===
The Children's Realm combined practical advice on vegetarian living with stories, poetry, essays and illustrations. Several features continued those of The Children's Garden. Regular columns included "In the Kitchen", which provided recipes and dietary advice; "For the Boys", written under the name The Captain; "Uncle Joker's Page"; and "Our Correspondence Column". The magazine also published news from children's vegetarian branches and notices of meetings and other activities.

Articles discussed health, nutrition, gardening, geography and the treatment of animals. The magazine also printed serialised fiction and short stories in which animal characters and children confronted questions about cruelty, meat consumption and human responsibilities towards other living beings.

The editors encouraged children to send letters, drawings, essays and stories. Writing competitions asked readers to explain their reasons for vegetarianism, consider the ethics of eating animals and discuss subjects such as "Diseases, Drunkenness, Crimes and Cruelties, Connected with Flesh Eating". Correspondence came from vegetarian and non-vegetarian children, including readers whose principal interests were animals or plants. Kubisz interprets these exchanges as attempts to encourage children to examine their attitudes towards nature and vegetarianism.

The magazine also employed humour and fantasy in its treatment of dietary reform. Kubisz describes its tone as playful and occasionally self-mocking, citing illustrations of a child suffering from "cabbage-itis" after eating too much cabbage and a human head transformed into a carrot.

=== Social reform and philanthropy ===
The Children's Realm reported on charitable activities intended to improve the lives of poorer children. These included The Nest, a vegetarian children's home; the Children's Dinner Fund, which provided inexpensive or free meals; and the Fresh Air Fund, which arranged countryside excursions for children from urban areas. Articles contrasted the circumstances of middle-class readers with those of children living in poverty and encouraged support for these projects.

The magazine also discussed injustice beyond diet and animal welfare. Editorials encouraged readers to oppose unfair treatment "wherever we find it", while articles and stories considered girls' and boys' roles within the family and human relationships with the natural environment. Kubisz interprets these subjects as examples of vegetarian ideas being connected with gender politics and early environmental concerns.

=== W. B. Shearn and children's activities ===
The London fruiterer W. B. Shearn was an active supporter of The Children's Realm. His father, Benjamin Shearn, operated a vegetarian restaurant on Tottenham Court Road, with a Fruit Saloon and Palm Garden Luncheon Rooms. The family also maintained a nearby fruit and vegetable business. W. B. Shearn, who preferred to describe himself as a fruitarian, managed the business and the Fruitarian Luncheon Saloon, which was used as a meeting place by members of the London Vegetarian Society and young vegetarians.

From 1907, advertisements for "B. Shearn & Son, the largest Health Food Stores in London" appeared regularly in the magazine. Shearn sponsored essay competitions, including one on "Why I Am a Vegetarian", and offered baskets of fruit as prizes. He invited competitors to a "fruit tea and conversazione", supplied fruit for Yuletide festivals and Christmas bazaars, and organised parties for vegetarian children.

Kubisz discusses Shearn's activities as part of the social environment surrounding the magazine, providing opportunities for children to meet other vegetarians and participate in events beyond reading and correspondence.

== Contributors ==
=== L. A. Hayter and Gerald Bullett ===
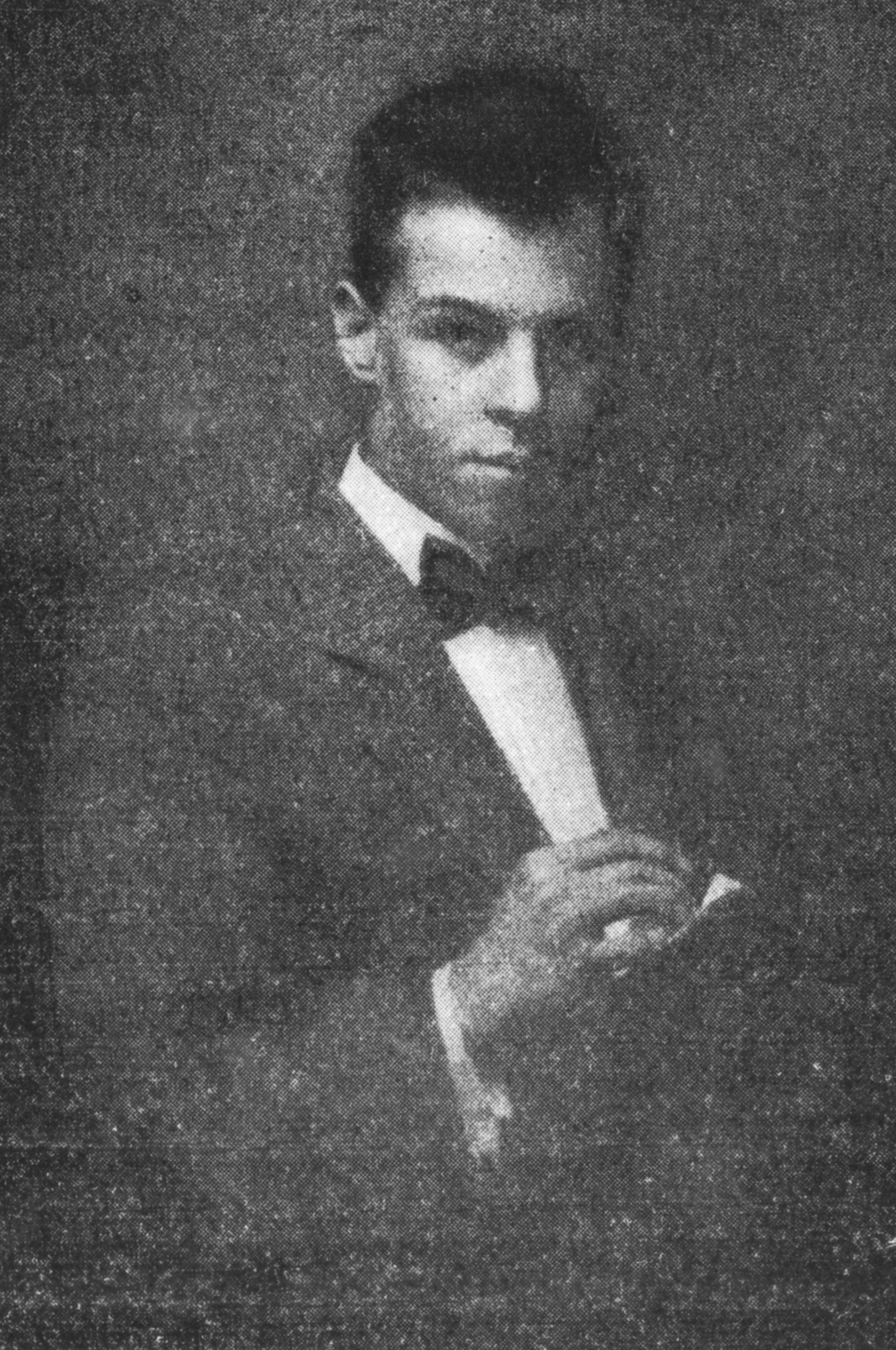
L. A. Hayter, the magazine's principal illustrator, c. 1910

The young artist and writer L. A. Hayter contributed illustrations and fiction to The Children's Realm, sometimes collaborating with his schoolfriend Gerald Bullett. His stories included "The Weather Kingdom", "The Land of Undh-Aneethe" and "The Nimble Sixpence". They employed fantasy and absurd humour, with characters such as goblins, fairies, talking coins and personified natural forces.

The magazine also published early fiction by Bullett, who later became a novelist, poet and literary critic. His contributions included "The Rescue" and "A Moonlight Shadow", both published during the late 1900s.

=== George Bedborough ===
George Bedborough, a freethinker and social reformer who sometimes wrote under the name "Uncle George", contributed articles and stories about animals and humanitarian subjects. Before his involvement with The Children's Realm, he had edited The Adult, advocated the decriminalisation of homosexuality and written on sexual reform. Historian James Gregory describes The Children's Realm as being "conducted" by Bedborough.

Kubisz states that Bedborough adopted vegetarianism after visiting the slaughterhouses of Chicago with the American freethinker Moses Harman.

From 1911, Bedborough contributed regularly to The Children's Realm. His writings included travel accounts, recollections of animals he had known, parables, autobiographical essays and dream narratives. Several were collected in Stories from the Children's Realm: A Book for Those Who Love Children and Animals (1914), published by the Vegetarian Federal Union and advertised as advocating vegetarianism from a humanitarian standpoint.

Kubisz argues that Bedborough's stories encouraged children to consider the experiences of animals and other people. She observes that he frequently presented cruelty as arising from thoughtlessness rather than deliberate malice and used fantasy to encourage sympathy with those who suffered. She also notes that his criticism of racial prejudice remained influenced by contemporary imperial assumptions, despite his comparisons between the treatment of racialised people and the treatment of animals.

== Reception and preservation ==
The satirical magazine Punch mocked the earnestness of The Children's Realm. In Mr. Punch's History of Modern England, Charles L. Graves records that Punch reproduced what it described as a letter from a young reader of the magazine in 1907. The letter concerned a boy described as "a very earnest vegetarian", whom Punch portrayed as excessively serious about his principles.

The Ernest Bell Library holds 84 consecutive issues of The Children's Realm, covering volumes 1–7, from January 1906 to December 1912. Issues from 1913 and 1914 are held by the British Library. Kubisz notes that copies of the magazine, like those of other middle-class children's periodicals of the period, frequently survive in bound annual volumes.

In Children's Vegetarian Culture in the Victorian Era (2024), Kubisz examines The Children's Realm alongside The Daisy Basket and The Children's Garden as part of the development of children's vegetarian print culture. She argues that these periodicals encouraged young readers to participate in vegetarian communities through correspondence, competitions and shared reading, while also promoting adult expectations of moral and dietary conduct.

In her earlier study of vegan literature for children, Kubisz places these magazines within the history of children's writing about vegetarianism and animal advocacy. She identifies the closure of The Children's Realm in 1914 with the end of an early period of growth in children's vegetarian publishing, before its later twentieth-century development.

== See also ==
- Bibliography of veganism and vegetarianism
- History of vegetarianism
- Vegetarianism in the Victorian era
- Vegetarianism in the United Kingdom

== Bibliography ==
- Graves, Charles L. (1922). Mr. Punch's History of Modern England. Vol. IV: 1892–1914. London: Cassell – via Project Gutenberg.
- Gregory, James (2007). Of Victorians and Vegetarians. I.B. Tauris. ISBN 978-0-85771-526-5.
- Edmundson, John (9 September 2014). "Some of The First Ever Magazines For Vegetarian Children". HappyCow.
- Kubisz, Marzena (12 March 2021), "Vegan literature for children", in Wright, Laura (ed.), The Routledge Handbook of Vegan Studies (1st ed.), Abingdon, Oxon; New York, NY: Routledge, pp. 65–75, doi:10.4324/9781003020875-8, ISBN 978-1-003-02087-5
- Kubisz, Marzena (14 August 2024). Children's Vegetarian Culture in the Victorian Era: The Juvenile Food Reformers Press and Literary Change. London: Routledge. doi:10.4324/9781003400042. ISBN 978-1-003-40004-2.
