= L. A. Hayter =

English children's illustrator and writer (1893–1917)

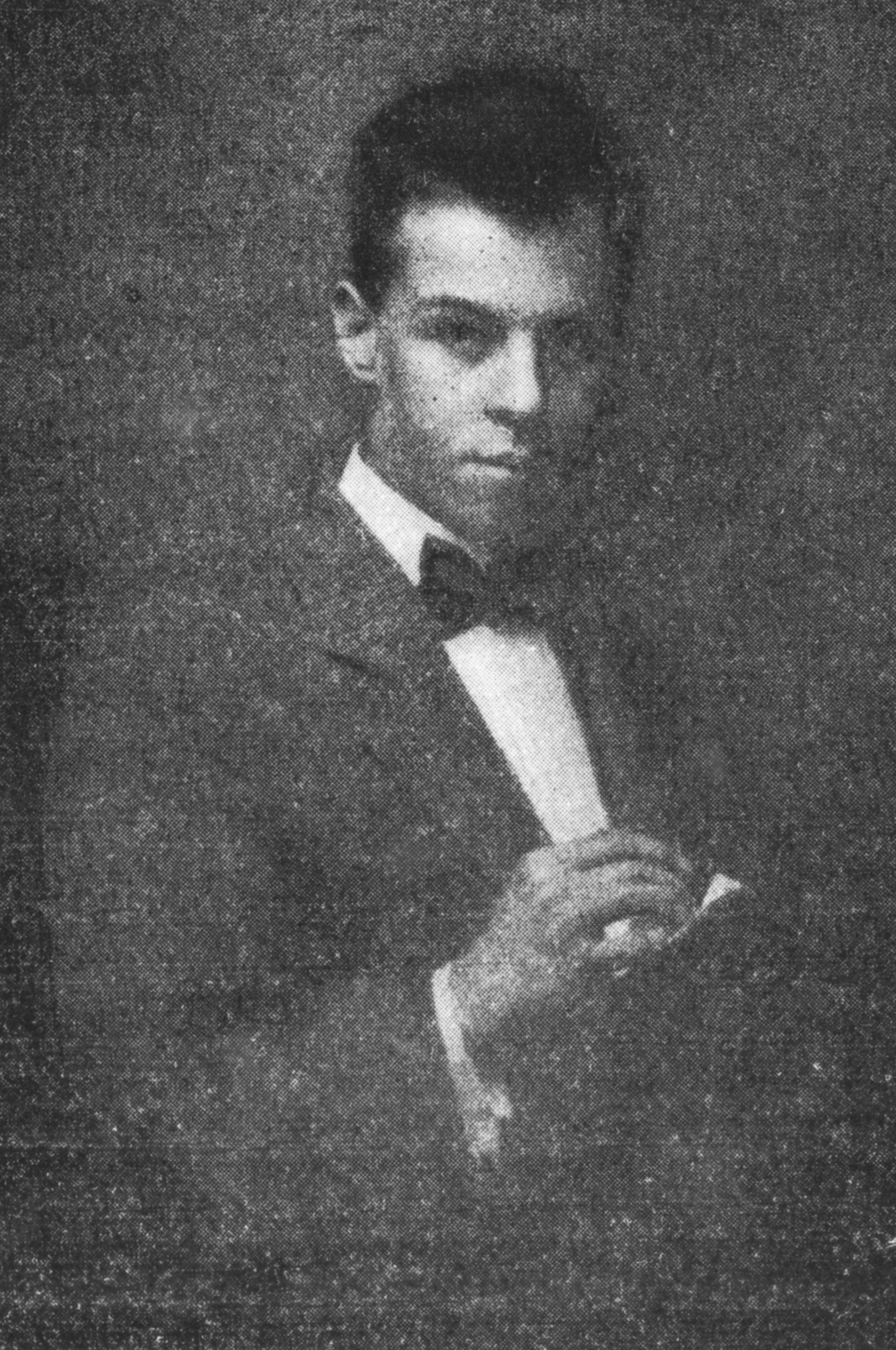
- Hayter, c. 1910
- Born: Lawrence Ambrose Hayter; 13 April 1893; Upper Holloway, London, England
- Died: 30 December 1917 (aged 24); Hollebeke, Belgium
- Burial place: I. H. 8., Klein Vierstraat British Cemetery, Belgium; 50°48′19″N 02°50′20″E
- Occupations: Children's illustrator and writer
- Notable work: The Children's Realm (1908–1914)
- Partner: Gladys Cawston (engaged)
- Military career
- Allegiance: United Kingdom
- Branch: British Army
- Rank: Private
- Units: Bedfordshire Regiment, 6th Battalion
- Conflicts: World War I †
- Awards: British War Medal; Victory Medal
- Memorials: Letchworth Cross

Lawrence Ambrose Hayter (13 April 1893 – 30 December 1917) was an English children's illustrator and writer associated with vegetarian children's literature. He illustrated The Children's Realm, a magazine for children published by the Vegetarian Federal Union and the London Vegetarian Society, and also contributed stories and articles to it. Hayter lived in Letchworth, worked as a draughtsman, and was engaged to the musician Gladys Cawston. During the First World War, he initially registered as a conscientious objector, but later enlisted in the Bedfordshire Regiment, 6th Battalion. He was killed in action near Hollebeke, Belgium, in December 1917.

== Biography ==
=== Early life and education ===
Lawrence Ambrose Hayter was born on 13 April 1893 in Upper Holloway, London, to Arthur William and Edith Rose Hayter; his father worked as an organ builder. At school he became friends with Gerald Bullett and produced a jellygraphed school magazine, which he edited and illustrated with cartoons.

=== Illustration and writing ===
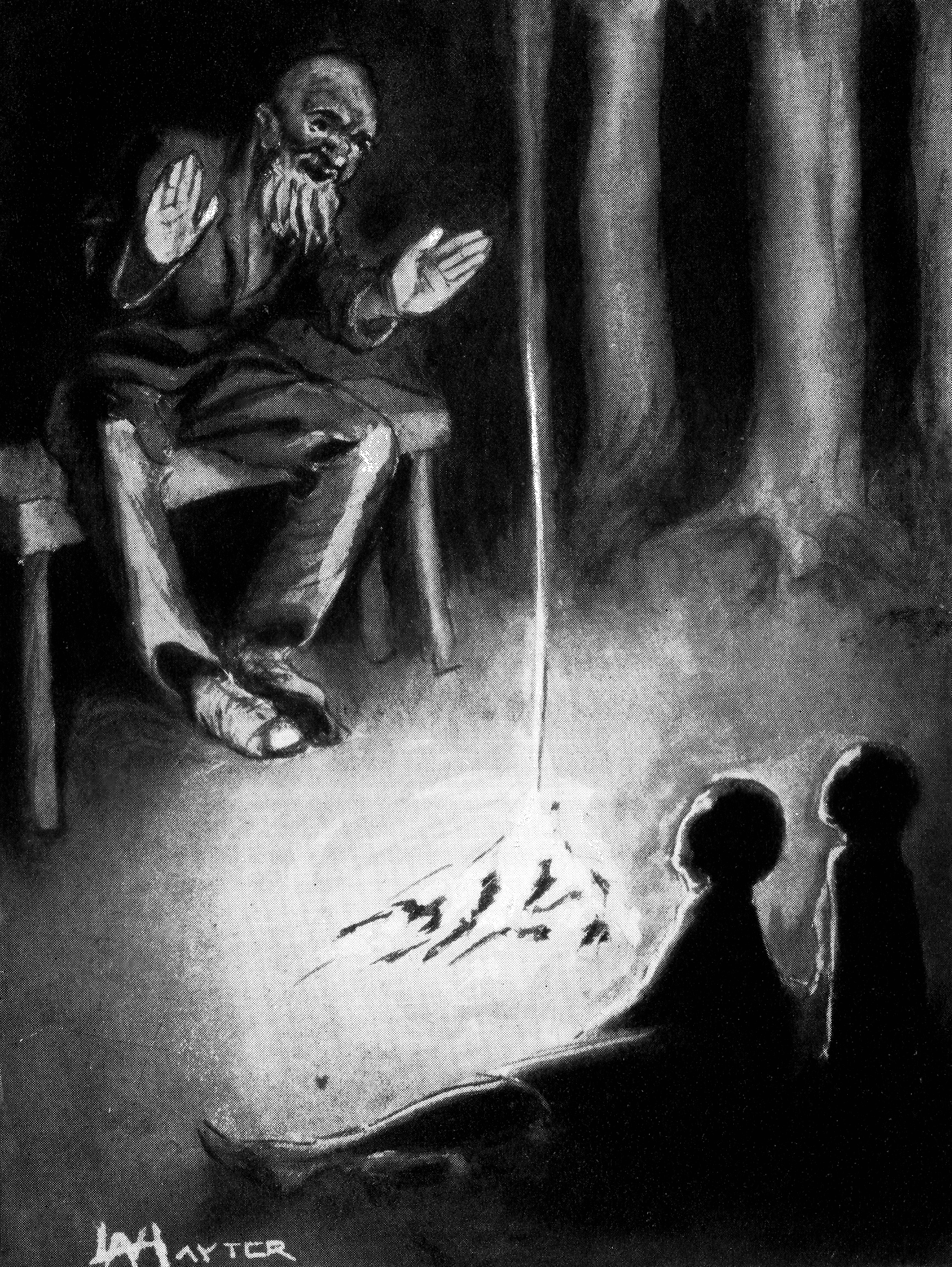
Illustration by Hayter for George Bedborough's Stories from the Children's Realm (1914)

Hayter lived in Letchworth, where he worked as a draughtsman. He was engaged to the musician Gladys Cawston.

Hayter was the principal illustrator for The Children's Realm, a children's magazine published by the Vegetarian Federal Union and the London Vegetarian Society. His first illustration for the magazine appeared in its Christmas 1908 issue.

Hayter also contributed articles and stories, some of them co-written with Gerald Bullett. His stories included "The Weather Kingdom", "The Land of Undh-Aneethe", and "The Nimble Sixpence". In 1912, Bullett described Hayter as a "born artist" in an article about him for the magazine.

The Children's Realm ceased publication in 1914. In the same year, its editor George Bedborough published Stories from the Children's Realm, a children's storybook with animal rights, anti-vivisection, and vegetarian themes, which included several illustrations by Hayter.

=== Military service and death ===
During the First World War, Hayter initially registered as a conscientious objector, but later enlisted in the Bedfordshire Regiment as a private in the 6th Battalion.

In the summer of 1917, Hayter was buried by a shell explosion and was mistakenly presumed dead. In November that year, a letter by Hayter was published in the Christian Science Sentinel, in which he described his experiences in the trenches and stated that he had recovered from dysentery through the teachings of Christian Science.

Hayter was killed in action by shelling in the trenches near Hollebeke, Belgium, on 30 December 1917. He was buried at Klein Vierstraat British Cemetery (I. H. 8.). He was posthumously awarded the British War Medal and Victory Medal. His name is recorded on the Letchworth Cross memorial.
