= James Wainwright =

James Wainwright may refer to:

- Sir James Wainwright (administrator) (1837–1929), governor, almoner and treasurer of St Thomas' Hospital, London, England
- James Wainwright (actor) (1938–1999), American actor
