= Greevz Fisher =

Anglo-Irish businessman and anarchist

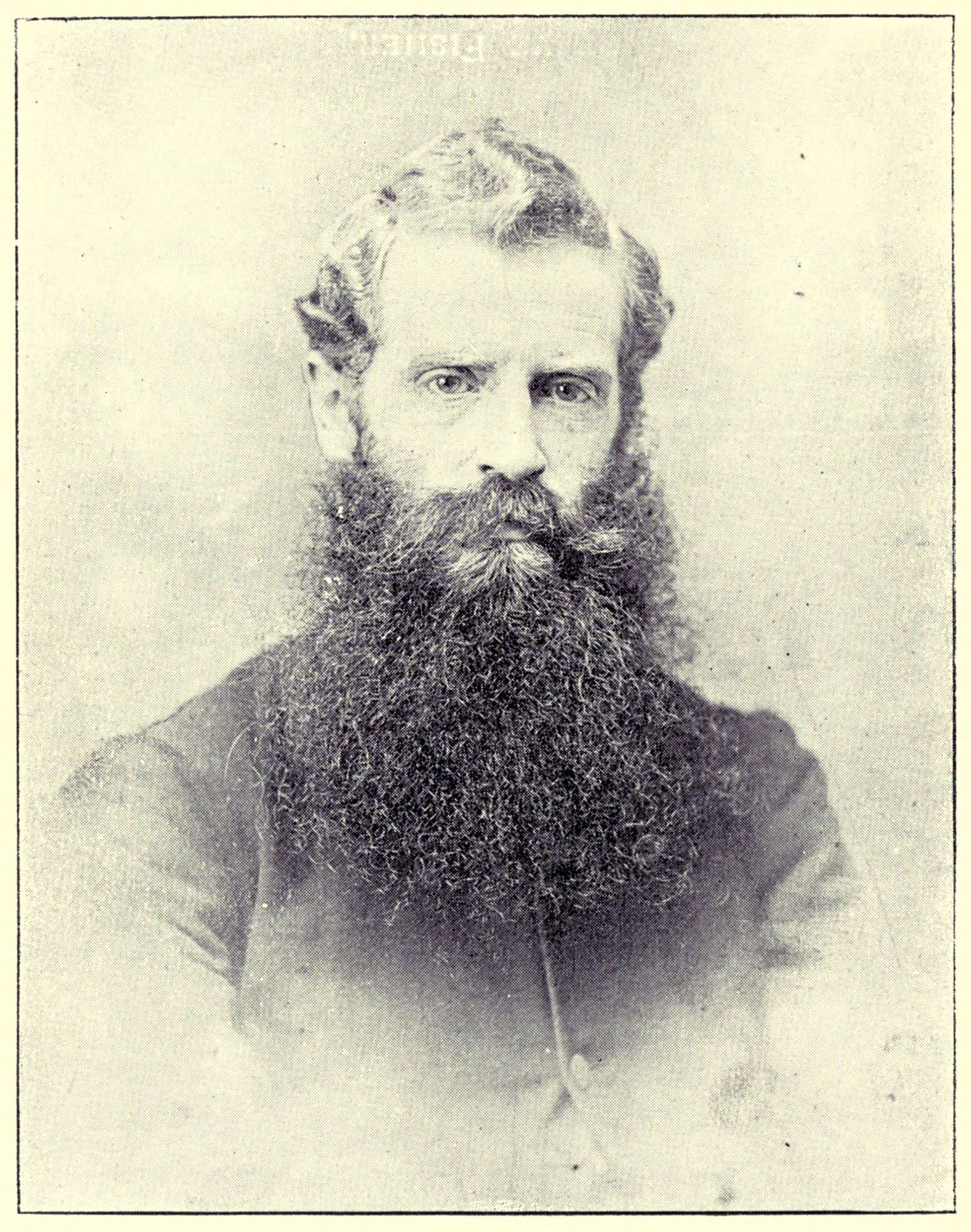
- Greevz Fisher (1895)
- Born: John Greeves Fisher; September 9, 1845; Youghal, Ireland
- Died: May 18, 1931 (aged 85); Leeds
- Occupation(s): Activist, philologist
- Organization: Legitimation League
- Movement: Anarchism, individualism
- Spouse: Marie Clapham
- Children: Auberon Herbert (1888-1932); Wordsworth Donisthorpe (1889-1950); Constance Naden (1891-1984); Spencer Darwin (1893-1968); Hypatia Ingersoll (1899-1977)

Greevz Fisher (born John Greeves Fisher; 9 September 1845 – 18 May 1931) was an Anglo-Irish businessman, anarchist, activist, philologist, and co-founder of the Legitimation League.

== Life ==
John Greeves Fisher was born in Youghal, Ireland, in 1845. In 1877, he moved to Wetherby, Yorkshire to join his cousin in business in Leeds. Although raised as a Quaker, by 1884 Fisher was described as "an acknowledged disbeliever", remaining an atheist for the rest of his life. In 1887 he married Marie Clapham, a suffragist and fellow freethinker who Fisher met at a secularist meeting in Leeds.

Fisher campaigned for the abolition of illegitimacy, and was a staunch advocate of birth control, publishing and distributing free literature on contraception. The goal of the Legitimation League was "to create machinery for acknowledging offspring born out of wedlock, and to secure for them equal rights with legitimate children." In 1893, Fisher published a pamphlet titled Illegitimate Children: An Inquiry into their Personal Rights and a Plea for the Abolition of Illegitimacy. He was considered among the leading individualists, alongside figures such as Auberon Herbert, Wordsworth Donisthorpe, Joseph Hiam Levy, and Henry Seymour. Fisher himself wrote that:

The individualist creed is that the maximum of liberty is the most useful treatment for all rational beings, and… to suppose rationality to pertain to each anthropoid individual taken at random, at least until some evidence is forthcoming to the contrary.

In 1892, Fisher offered himself as a 'Liberty candidate' for East Bradford. His platform included "voluntary taxation, no compulsory education, liberty for Ireland with no government, the abolition of professional monopolies, and female freedom".

Fisher was the inventor of a simplified form of spelling, from which the alternative spelling of his own name (Greevz, and sometimes Fysher) was derived. An example of this can be seen in a letter Fisher wrote to The Phonographic Magazine, in which he advised language reformers to: "selekt the simplest spelling praktikabel for any word when in doubt az to the kustomary form".

In addition to contributing regularly to publications such as Liberty, Fisher edited a paper called The Free Thought Record. Knowledgeable on natural history, Fisher was also President of The Yorkshire Naturalists' Union in 1930.

Greevz Fisher died on 18 May 1931, survived by Marie and their five children. On his death, the Leeds Mercury mourned the loss of one of the city's "best known and most distinctive personalities", describing how Fisher still cycled to and from his business into his 80s.

== Bibliography ==
- Voluntary Taxation (1890)
- The Learner's Companion and Teacher's Helper: illustrating the rules of Pitman's Shorthand (1887)
- Illegitimate children: an inquiry into their native rights and a plea for the abolition of illegitimacy (1893)
- The Currency of the Empire: a reply to the Rt. Hon. A.J. Balfour (1894)
- Is Secularism Degrading?: verbatim report of a public discussion between Walton Powell and J. Greevz Fisher (1894)
- Postal reform: an exposure of the injustice and absurdity of the scale of postage charges (1894)
- Coercion and Currency (1897)
