= Joseph Levy =

Joseph Levy may refer to:

- Joseph Moses Levy (1812–1888), newspaper editor and publisher
- Joseph Hiam Levy (1838–1913), English author and economist
- Joseph Halévy (1827–1917), French Orientalist and traveller
