= A. M. Cole =

English vegetarianism activist

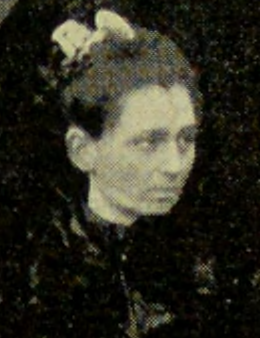
- Cole in 1894
- Occupations: Vegetarianism activist; cookery teacher; editor
- Years active: 1893–1921
- Known for: Work in vegetarian organisations

A. M. Cole (fl. 1893–1921) was an English vegetarianism activist, cookery teacher, and editor. She worked with the Vegetarian Federal Union, the London Vegetarian Association, the London Vegetarian Society, the Women's Vegetarian Union, the West London Vegetarian Society, and the Battersea, Clapham and Wandsworth Vegetarian Society. She edited The Children's Realm and held posts in the Children's Dinner Fund and the Women's Freedom League.

== Career ==
In 1893, Cole prepared a set of vegetarian menus that received high commendation at the Universal Cookery Exhibition. The menus were later published as "Menus for a Week in November" in Rachel Swain's Swain Cookery and in Florence I. Nicholson's The Jubilee Cookery Book: Vegetarian Recipes.

Cole worked in several London vegetarian organisations. She assisted Philip G. Tovey in founding the Battersea, Clapham and Wandsworth Vegetarian Society, with A. C. Field. She was a committee member of the Women's Vegetarian Union and gave a cookery lesson for the union at the offices of the Vegetarian Federal Union in 1898.

According to James Gregory, Cole worked as an assistant to Nicholson and later to Charlotte Despard. She succeeded Nicholson as editor of The Children's Realm. By 1914, she was honorary secretary of the Vegetarian Federal Union.

Cole gave public talks and demonstrations on vegetarian cookery. In 1910, as secretary of the West London Vegetarian Society, she gave a cookery demonstration at a vegetarian dinner held by the society at Pirbright Hall, Southfields. In 1913, as honorary secretary of the London Vegetarian Society, she spoke on "What is Vegetarianism" at a meeting at the Adult School in Sutton.

In July 1915, The Jewish Chronicle published an interview with Cole, then secretary of the London Vegetarian Association, on vegetarianism and Jewish dietary practice. She argued that a vegetarian diet was compatible with Jewish religious observance and discussed food economy during the First World War. In 1917, when described as a former organising secretary of the London Vegetarian Association, she gave cookery demonstrations for the Food and Cookery Association in Southampton, where she presented vegetarian menus and methods for reducing food waste.

Cole was listed as secretary of the Children's Dinner Fund in 1916. Hilda Kean writes that Nicholson established the fund for underfed children, distributing cheap meals of vegetable soup, wholemeal bread, and wholemeal currant bread. In 1921, Cole was honorary secretary and organiser of the Women's Freedom League Settlement in Nine Elms, which provided daily penny and halfpenny hot meals for more than 100 children and operated a milk depot.

== Publications ==
- Economy in the Kitchen (with Florence I. Nicholson, 1904)
- A Few Remarks on Vegetarian Diet (c. 1915)
- The Children's Realm (editor)

== See also ==
- History of vegetarianism
- Vegetarianism in the Victorian era
- Vegetarianism in the United Kingdom
- Women and vegetarianism and veganism advocacy
