= Margaret Blatch =

English chef, restaurateur, and cookbook writer (1886–1963)

Margaret Blatch M.C.A. (Note: Member of the Cookery Association.)
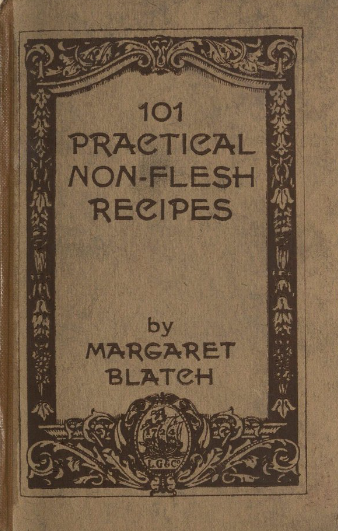
- Cover of One Hundred and One Practical Non-Flesh Recipes, 1917
- Born: Margaret Kelleher; 22 June 1886; Isle of Sheppey, Kent, England
- Died: 15 August 1963 (aged 77); Islington, London, England
- Occupations: Chef; restaurateur; cookbook writer
- Years active: 1900s–1963
- Known for: Vegetarian cookery
- Notable work: One Hundred and One Practical Non-Flesh Recipes (1916)
- Spouse: Joseph Francis G. Blatch (m. 1906; died 1921)
- Awards: Three gold, six silver, and four bronze medals (Food and Cookery Exhibitions)

Margaret Blatch (née Kelleher; 22 June 1886 – 15 August 1963) was an English vegetarian chef, restaurateur, and cookbook writer. She and her husband became vegetarian around 1907 and developed vegetarian recipes for competition and restaurant use. She served as principal of the Eustace Miles School of Cookery and published cookbooks including One Hundred and One Practical Non-Flesh Recipes (1916) and Household Non-Flesh Cookery (1936). Blatch managed the London vegetarian restaurant Shearns from 1923 until its closure in 1962.

== Biography ==
=== Early and personal life ===
Blatch was born Margaret Kelleher on the Isle of Sheppey, Kent, on 22 June 1886. She married Joseph Francis G. Blatch in 1906 at Marylebone; (Note: Her maiden name is recorded as Kelcher on her marriage record.) he died in 1921, aged 41.

=== Career ===
==== Vegetarian cookery and early restaurant work ====
Blatch and her husband became vegetarian around 1907. Over the next nine years, they developed vegetarian dishes with attention to nutrition, digestibility, flavour, and presentation. Their entries in Food and Cookery Exhibitions at the Royal Horticultural Hall received three gold, six silver, and four bronze medals, as well as diplomas for vegetarian cookery. They also catered for the public at Blatch's Restaurant, 50 Cannon Street, London, and at other venues.

==== Eustace Miles School of Cookery and first cookbook ====
For four years, Blatch worked as principal of the Eustace Miles School of Cookery. According to the preface to One Hundred and One Practical Non-Flesh Recipes, requests from pupils led her to prepare a recipe book. In 1916, she self-published One Hundred and One Practical Non-Flesh Recipes. (Note: The term vegetarian was well established by the 1840s, but in the early 20th century it was often associated with religious or ethical abstinence, and "non-flesh" or "flesh-abstainer" were used as less provocative alternatives.) A 92-page second edition was published by Longmans, Green & Co in 1917. A third edition was published in 1917 and again in 1918.

==== Pamphlets and later cookbooks ====
In the 1902, Blatch published the pamphlet Conservative Cookery as part of the London Vegetarian Society's Humane Diet Leaflets series. She published Household Non-Flesh Cookery in 1936.

==== Botulism inquest ====
In 1935, four people died after eating nut meat brawn, with three cases attributed to botulism. At the inquest, Blatch testified that she had supervised the product's manufacture for 29 years and that there had been no previous complaint. The jury found that there was no negligence by the manufacturers. The evidence stated that the germ itself was not present in the food when it was prepared, although a toxin had developed before consumption. Experts stated that botulism was a theoretical risk, but that British canning methods were regarded as safe. The coroner noted the rarity of the disease and recommended further precautions in future production.

==== Shearns and media coverage ====
In 1940, the Daily Mirror described Blatch as "London's famous vegetarian chef". She was quoted in the article on the demand for mock meats.

Blatch managed the London vegetarian restaurant Shearns from 1923 until its closure in 1962. The restaurant served about 500 vegetarian meals a day. Its customers included George Bernard Shaw, the Countess of Warwick, and a number of suffragettes.

=== Death ===
Blatch died at the Royal Northern Hospital, Islington, on 15 August 1963.

== Reception and later use ==
One Hundred and One Practical Non-Flesh Recipes is included in Southern Adventist University's "Foodies' Guide to Vegetarian Cookery in 19th Century America".

Vegetarian cookbook writer Rose Elliot learned to cook by reading Household Non-Flesh Cookery. Elliot's 1972 book Simply Delicious is dedicated to Blatch.

== Publications ==
- One Hundred and One Practical Non-Flesh Recipes. London. 1916.
- Bell, Ernest, ed. (1902). Conservative Cookery. London: London Vegetarian Society.
- Household Non-Flesh Cookery. London: G. Gladding & Co. 1936.
