= Richard Wainright Duke Turner =

R W D Turner FRCP, FRCPE, OBE was a British physician, cardiologist and author. He was born in Purley in 1909, a grandson of Sir James Wainwright, and died in Ditchling in 1992. Turner served as a lieutenant colonel in the Royal Army Medical Corps (RAMC) and then as chief physician of the Western General Hospital in Edinburgh, where he collaborated with Andrew Logan to carry out the first mitral valve replacement in the UK. He founded the Turner-Dumbrell Trust, a conservation charity in Ditchling and was married to the daughter of Henry Meulen.

In 1949 Turner was elected a member of the Harveian Society of Edinburgh and served as president in 1973.

== Books ==
- Turner, Richard Wainwright Duke. Auscultation of the Heart. (1963, 1964, 1968, 1972,1984)
- Turner, Richard Wainwright Duke. Electrocardiography (1963, 1964)
