= London Dialectical Society =

The London Dialectical Society was a British professional association that was formed in 1867, the basis of its constitution was "That truth is of all things the most to be desired, and is best elicited by the conflict of opposing opinions." and that "the Society should afford a field for the philosophical consideration of all questions without reserve, but especially of those comprised in the domain of ethics, metaphysics, and theology". It is best known for its debates on population growth and neo-Malthusianism, Secularism, and its investigation and report in 1871 into the claims of Spiritualism.

== History ==
The Society was founded in 1867, with its inaugural meeting taking place on 29 January, under the presidency of John Lubbock and its vice-president Dr. Andrew Clark. It gathered together highly regarded professional individuals to speak on issues of the day. Ordinary Meetings of the Society were held at the Rooms of the Society, 32A, George Street, Hanover Square, London, on the evenings of the first and third Wednesday in each month during the yearly session- that commenced on 1 October and finished on 31 July. Twenty-one meetings were held during the session 1867/68. An analysis of the subjects handled showed "as many as eleven were purely Sociological or Ethical, four Theological, three Political, one Metaphysical, and two of a mixed character"

In its Prospectus, explaining the choice of name, it cited the Scottish philosopher Alexander Bain from his work on early philosophy and the importance of the Socratic method:

"The essence of the Dialectic Method is to place side by side, with every doctrine and its reasons, all opposing doctrines and their reasons, allowing these to be stated in full by the persons holding them. No doctrine is to be held as expounded, far less proved, unless it stands in parallel array to every other counter- theory, with all that can be said for each. For a short time this system was actually maintained and practised; but the execution of Sokrates gave it its first check, and the natural intolerance of mankind rendered its continuance impossible. Since the Reformation, struggles have been made to regain for the discussion of questions generally, -philosophical, political, moral, and religious, the two-sided procedure of the law-courts, and perhaps never more strenuously than now."

The Society had a broad remit to allow "the most absolute freedom of debate" with no topic excluded from discussion (except on the grounds of "triviality"). It therefore hosted debates on a wide variety of topics, examples of which include 'Over-population and Public Health' (July 1868) at which Charles Bradlaugh and Charles Robert Drysdale both spoke. It was these discussions that provoked the anger of the British Medical Journal referring to them as "abominable proceedings for the purpose of keeping down the numbers of our population". 'On Marriage' (April 1871) led by Moncure D. Conway, and 'The Philosophy of Secularism' (December 1872) opened by Charles Watts. Many well known speakers started at the Society including Joseph Hiam, the journalist and campaigner. Elizabeth Clarke Wolstenholme Elmy was invited to speak on more than one occasion. The format of these sessions was usually that an eminent speaker gave an opening lecture, which was followed by a debate open to all attendees. In 1868–69 the Society published a pamphlet explaining its purpose, history, and rules, as well as a report covering its activities and members in 1866–68.

== 1871 report ==
The Society is probably best known for a Committee it formed "to investigate the phenomena alleged to be spiritual manifestations and to report thereon." In January 1869, a committee was appointed that included 33 members. Notable members included Charles Bradlaugh, Edward William Cox, Charles Maurice Davies, Joseph Hiam Levy, Cromwell Varley, and Alfred Russel Wallace. Thomas Henry Huxley and George Henry Lewes declined an invitation to join the Committee. Huxley stating that even "supposing the phenomena to be genuine, they do not interest me."

In 1871 a report by the committee was published. The Society declined to publish the report and it was printed on the responsibility of the committee only.

Six sub-committees had investigated the claims of spiritualism by attending séances and reported their findings. The report was heavily criticised by the scientific community as being of no scientific value. This was due to the fact that half of the committees "saw really nothing" and only the second committee had reported successful "presumably spiritualistic" phenomena. However, this conclusion was criticised as being based on unsupported statements from unreliable witnesses. The report was dismissed by influential newspapers. For example, The Times described the report as "nothing more than a farrago of impotent conclusions, garnished by a mass of the most monstrous rubbish it has ever been our misfortune to sit judgement on."

The fifth committee had investigated the medium Daniel Dunglas Home but "nothing occurred at any of the meetings which could be attributed to supernatural causes."

On the basis of this report, the London Dialectical Society has been described as a precursor to the Society for Psychical Research.

== Publications ==
- Report on Spiritualism, of the Committee of the London Dialectical Society (London: Longmans, Green, Reader & Dyer, 1871)

== See also ==
- London Spiritualist Alliance
- Seybert Commission
