= Rose Elliot =

British vegetarian cookery writer

- Born: 1945 (age 80–81)
- Occupation: Cookbook writer

Rose Elliot (born 22 June 1945) MBE is a British vegetarian cookery writer. She has written over 50 books on vegetarian cookery, which have sold three million copies around the world. Her first book, Simply Delicious, was published in 1967. Her latest cookery book, The Best Of Rose Elliot: The Ultimate Vegetarian Collection was published by Mitchell Beazley in 2014.

== Biography ==
At the age of three, she made the connection between fish to eat and the living creatures themselves and decided to become a vegetarian.

Her grandmother, Grace Cooke, was the founder of the spiritualist group White Eagle Lodge. As a member of the family, and vegetarian from the age of three. She learned to cook from Margaret Blatch's book Household Non-Flesh Cookery. Rose began cooking vegetarian food at the White Eagle Lodge Retreat Centre "New Lands". Rose enthusiastically rose to the challenge and created new recipes. Her food was so popular that her recipes were much in demand. This led to her producing a small booklet for the White Eagle Lodge charity. A few publicity copies went out, including to The Times. Rave reviews led to orders from bookshops, launching her career as a cookery writer. Her books are characterized by a chatty style and anecdotes about her experiments in cookery with her family.

Inspired by her late mother, Joan Hodgson, Rose became interested in astrology at 13, dedicating her book Life Cycles to her. For 5 years she also wrote "a weekly astrological column for British magazines including Woman’s Realm, Here’s Health and She. With her husband, Robert, she developed a computer based service "Rose Elliot Horoscopes". Rose Elliot was awarded the diploma of the Faculty of Astrological Studies (DFAstrolS) and joined the Astrological Association when she was 19, and in 2005 she became a Fellow of The Association of Professional Astrologers International (APAI). Her Life Cycles was completely revised and published by Polair Publishing in November 2008.

Rose is patron of the Vegetarian Society, VIVA and The Vegetarian and Vegan Foundation.

She lives in Hampshire and in London, and is a member of MENSA.

== Awards and honours ==
In 1999, she was awarded the MBE for services to vegetarian cookery.

== Select bibliography ==
- Simply Delicious The White Eagle Publishing Trust 1967
- Not Just a Load of Old Lentils The White Eagle Publishing Trust 1972,
- Thrifty Fifty, 50 Low Cost Recipes, Hampshire: White Eagle Publishing Trust, 1973
- The Oxfam Vegetable Cookbook, Oxfam 1975
- The Bean Book, Fontana 1979
- The Festive Vegetarian: Recipes and Menus for Every Occasion, New York, U.S.A.: Pantheon Books, 1983
- Rose Elliot's Book of Fruits, Fontana Paperbacks, 1983
- Book of Savoury Flans and Pies, Fontana. 1984.
- Beanfeast; a beginner's guide to wholefood cooking, Fontana 1985
- The New Vegetarian Cookbook, London: Octopus Books, 1986
- Vegetarian Mother and Baby Book, Pantheon Books, 1986
- Cooking with Beans and Pulses : With foreword and star recipes by Rose Elliot, Holland & Barrett / Thorsons Publishers. 1986.
- Vegetarian Dishes of the World, HarperCollins Publishers, 1988
- The Zodiac Cookbook, Pyramid, 1989
- Vegetarian Four Seasons, New York, NY, U.S.A.: Random House, 1994
- Life Cycles, The Influence of Planetary Cycles on Our Lives, Macmillan, 1993, and Pan, 1995.
- Rose Elliot's Oxfam Vegetarian Cooking For Children, Vermilion, 1995
- Rose Elliot's Vegetarian Fast Food : HarperCollinsPublishers, 1996.
- Gourmet Vegetarian Cooking, Thorsons, Wellingborough 1996
- Quick and Easy Vegetarian Meals for Students, Martin Books, 1997
- Vegetarian Meals for Students, HarperCollins, 1997
- Mother, Baby & Toddler Book, London: Harper Collins, 1997
- Vegetarian Express, Phoenix, 2001
- New Vegetarian Cooking: 120 Fast, Fresh, and Fabulous Recipes, Simon & Schuster, 2004
- Book Of Pasta ISBN 0-00-636703-8
- The Complete Vegetarian Cookbook
- Rose Elliot's Vegetarian Cookery
- Rose Elliot's Vegetarian Christmas
- Rose Elliot's New Complete Vegetarian Collins, 2010
- Best Of Rose Elliot, Mitchell Beazley, 2014
