= George Bedborough =

English writer and social reformer (1868–1940)

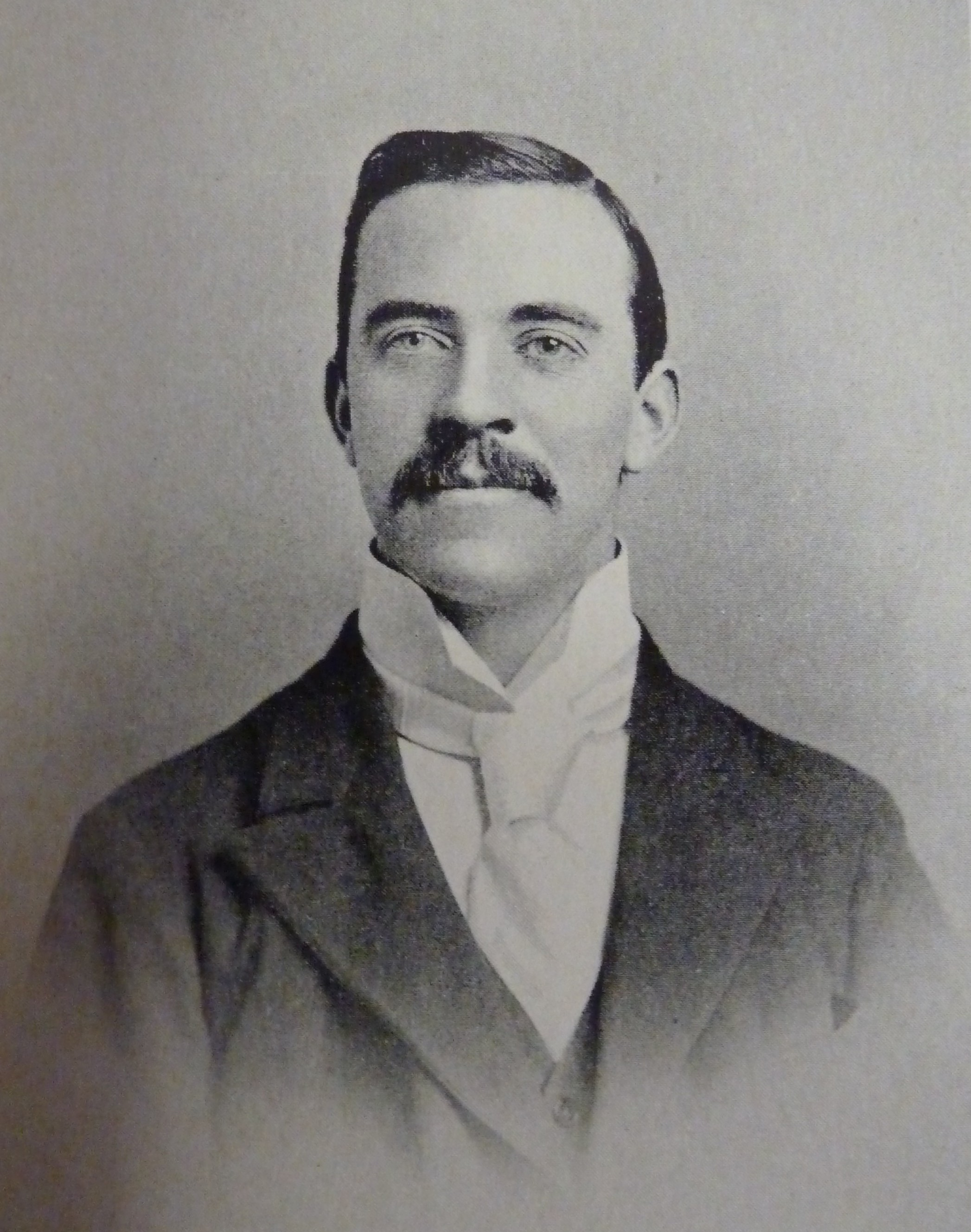
- Bedborough, c. 1898
- Born: George Bedborough Higgs; 10 January 1868; St Giles, London, England
- Died: 7 August 1940 (aged 72); Cambridge, England
- Education: Dulwich College
- Occupations: Writer; editor; social reformer; journalist; bookseller
- Known for: Regina v. Bedborough
- Movement: Freethought; secularism; vegetarianism; animal rights; free love
- Criminal charges: Publication of an obscene libel
- Criminal penalty: Fined £100 (equivalent to £11,238 in 2025)
- Spouse: Louisa "Louie" Fisher (m. 1892)

George Bedborough Higgs (10 January 1868 – 7 August 1940) was an English writer, editor, social reformer, journalist, and bookseller. He was involved in late 19th- and early 20th-century reform movements including freethought, secularism, vegetarianism, animal rights, birth control, the legitimation of illegitimate children, and free love. He was secretary of the Legitimation League and edited its journal, The Adult.

In 1898, Bedborough was prosecuted for publishing material charged as obscene, including Havelock Ellis's book on homosexuality, Studies in the Psychology of Sex Vol. 2, and writings associated with the Legitimation League. The case, Regina v. Bedborough, led to the formation of a Free Speech Defence Committee, whose supporters included George Bernard Shaw, Edward Carpenter, and G. W. Foote. Bedborough pleaded guilty and was fined £100 (equivalent to £11,238 in 2025). He also agreed to end his association with the League and The Adult, a decision criticised by some former allies.

After the trial, Bedborough continued to write on secularist, vegetarian, and animal advocacy themes. He edited The Children's Realm, a vegetarian magazine for children, and published fiction, poetry, and aphorisms. His works include The Atheist (1919), a poem advocating atheism and vegetarianism, and Prayer: An Indictment (1938), a criticism of prayer. After living for a period in the United States, he returned to England and died in Cambridge in 1940.

== Biography ==
=== Early life and education ===
George Bedborough Higgs (Note: Bedborough's father, a clergyman, is said to have detested his son's advocacy of free love; Arthur Calder-Marshall speculated that Bedborough abandoned his surname to avoid embarrassing his father.) was born in St Giles, London, on 10 January 1868. His father, Edward Squance Higgs, was a retired Church of England preacher and his mother was a poet. He was educated at Dulwich College and began work at the age of 16, founding the Workhouse Aid Society with W. T. Stead. Bedborough later attended university.

In 1887, Bedborough was present at Bloody Sunday in Trafalgar Square. He later wrote for publications including the Sunday Chronicle, Shafts, University Magazine, the Newcastle Weekly Chronicle, and the South London Mail. He was a friend and collaborator of Henry S. Salt, Bertram Dobell, and Ernest Bell.

From 1891 to 1892, Bedborough was a member of the National Society of Lanternists. He also worked occasionally as a lantern operator and lecturer.

On 18 April 1892, he married Louisa Fisher (Note: Bedborough's wife went by the name Louie.) at St George's Church, Jesmond, Northumberland. Judy Greenway states that the marriage was undertaken for the sake of his family and that he had an open relationship with his wife.

Bedborough was a member of the Legitimation League and edited its journal The Adult: A Journal for the Advancement of freedom in Sexual Relationships between 1897 and 1898. The League advocated for the legitimation of illegitimate children and free love. His wife was the League's treasurer.

=== Regina v. Bedborough ===
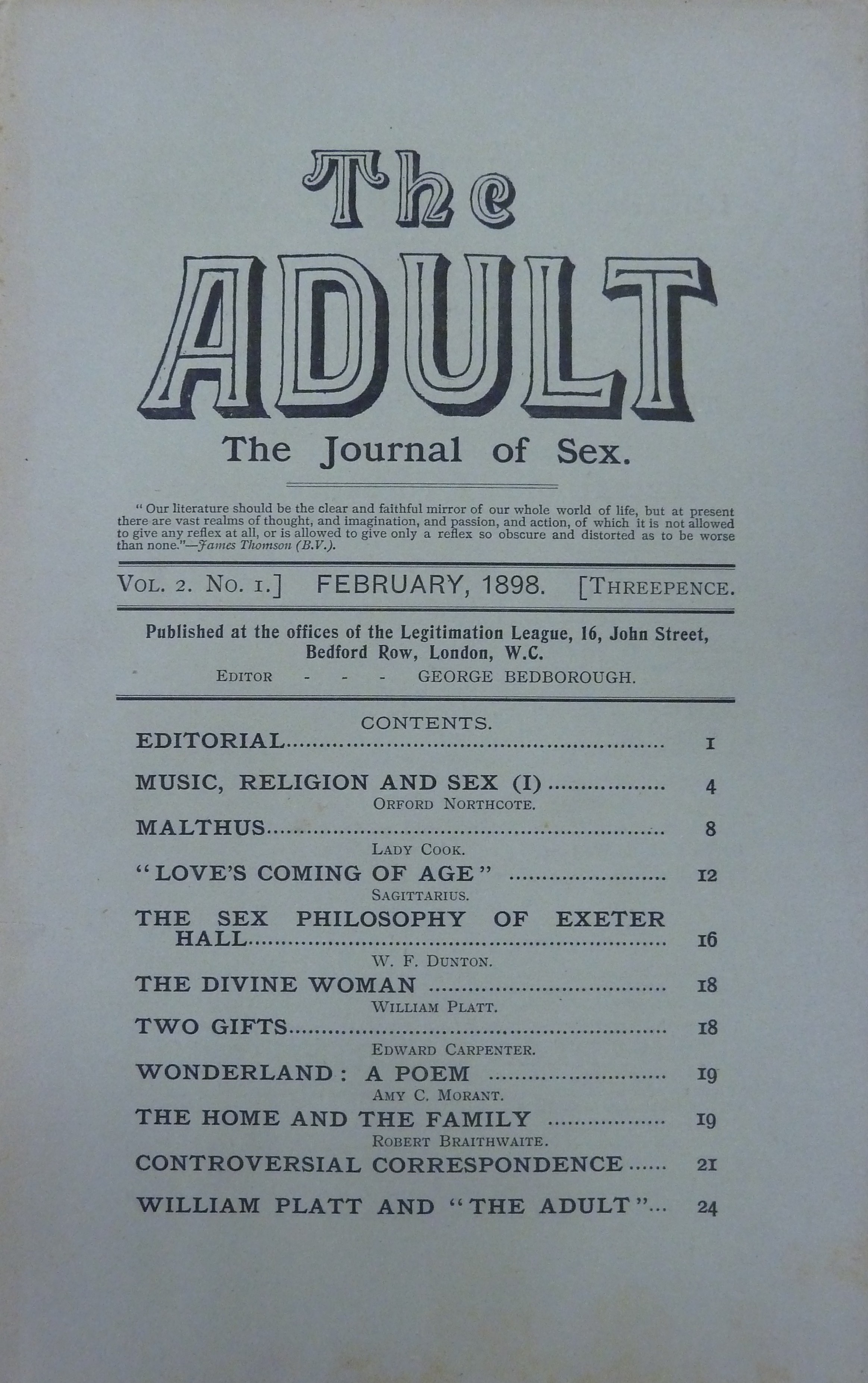
February 1898 edition of The Adult

On 31 May 1898, Bedborough was arrested, along with the sex-radical feminist Lillian Harman, and charged with obscenity for attempting to "corrupt the morals of Her Majesty's Subjects". He was indicted on 11 counts, including selling a copy of Studies in the Psychology of Sex Vol. 2, a book on homosexuality by Havelock Ellis, to an undercover agent, and selling other pamphlets considered indecent, including one by Oswald Dawson, the founder of the Legitimation League. He was also indicted for articles published in The Adult. Bedborough had been under surveillance because of the League's suspected anarchist connections; he was not an anarchist, but he was described as the London representative of the American anarchist periodical Lucifer, the Light-Bearer.

A Free Speech Defence Committee was formed to contest the case. Members included Henry Seymour, Frank Harris, Edward Carpenter, George Bernard Shaw, G. W. Foote, Mona Caird, and Grant Allen. Shortly before the prosecution, Bedborough cooperated with the police and pleaded guilty on three counts. The committee then denounced him and published details of the case. On 31 October 1898, Bedborough was fined £100 (equivalent to £11,238 in 2025) for selling Ellis's book. He agreed to end his association with the League and The Adult, writing in the December issue: "I adhere to my resolution not to excuse myself. I am a coward [...] I thank Henry Seymour, Mr. Foote, and others with all my heart and soul for their work, which I have requited illy indeed".

=== Vegetarianism and animal rights ===
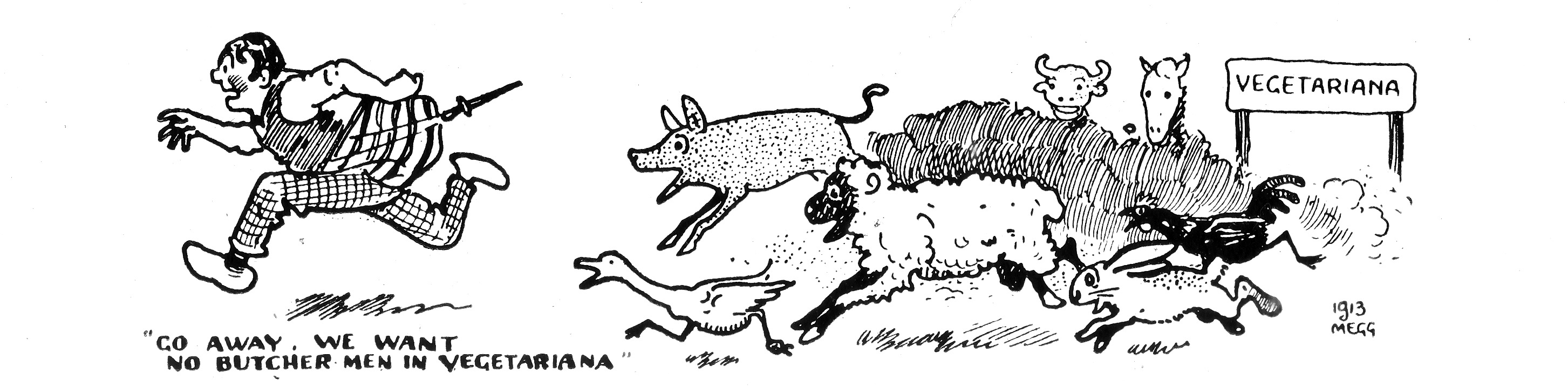
Illustration of "The Isle of Vegetariana"

Bedborough became a vegetarian in 1902 after visiting Moses Harman's home. He described the smell of the slaughterhouses as pervading Chicago. Harman suggested that they tour the meat-packing houses to test whether Bedborough would continue eating meat. Marzena Kubisz describes the visit as the point at which Bedborough became an advocate of vegetarianism and animal rights.

In 1906, Bedborough became editor of The Children's Realm, a children's magazine published by the Vegetarian Federal Union and London Vegetarian Society. He edited the magazine for most of its existence, until its closure in 1914. Bedborough wrote stories and essays for the magazine. Kubisz states that these works encouraged sympathy for animals and connected animal suffering with the treatment of oppressed humans, while also noting that Bedborough's views were shaped by the imperial assumptions of his period.

In "The Isle of Vegetariana", published in The Children's Realm in September 1913, Bedborough used an allegorical island of animals to present vegetarian and animal rights themes. The island is discovered, or imagined, by an unnamed elderly man and is described as a place where animals are not killed for food or sport. The story follows Mr Smith, a butcher who travels to the island to exploit its inhabitants for profit. After encounters with the animals, including protest and resistance, he renounces his profession and adopts vegetarianism.

In 1914, Bedborough published Stories from the Children's Realm, a children's story book with animal rights, anti-vivisection, and vegetarian themes. It included illustrations by L. A. Hayter, a former illustrator and contributor to The Children's Realm.

=== Later life and career ===
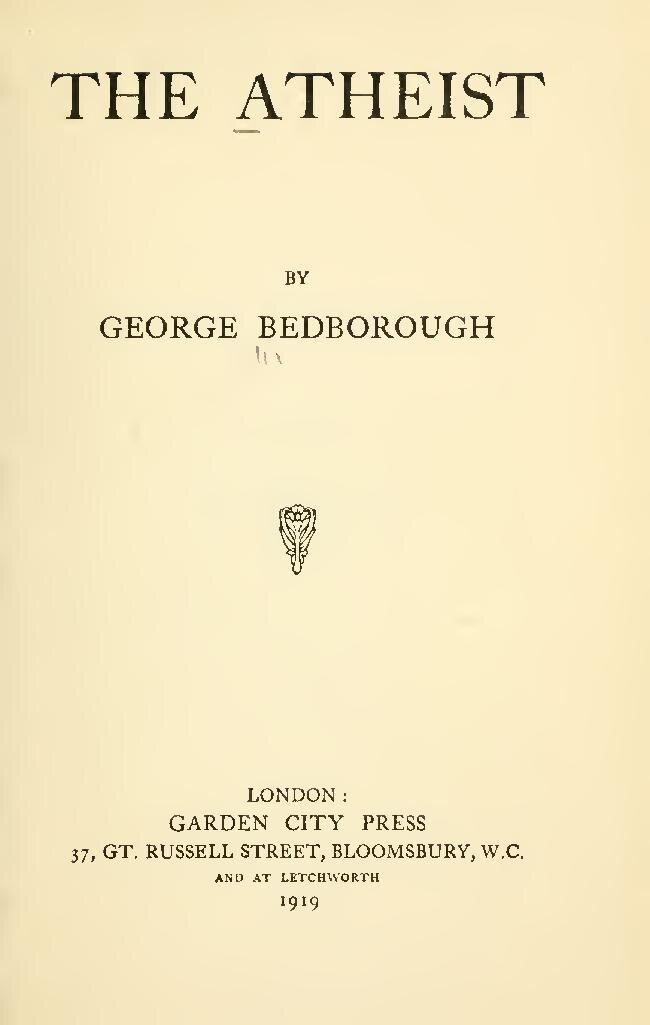
Title page of The Atheist (1919)

Bedborough contributed to Moses Harman's American Journal of Eugenics, published between 1907 and 1910. He was also active in the discussion circles of the feminist journal The Freewoman, which was published between 1911 and 1912. He was the London correspondent for Labour World in the United States.

Bedborough published three books of aphorisms, Narcotics and a Few Stimulants, Vacant Chaff Well Meant for Grain, and Subtilty to the Simple, and a book of epigrams, Vulgar Fractions. He published The Atheist in 1919, a poem that advocated atheism and criticised the killing of animals for human consumption. It was dedicated to Anatole France.

During the 1920s and 1930s, Bedborough reconnected with the secular movement. He wrote for The Freethinker, published an attack on the Ku Klux Klan in 1936, and wrote a reflection on Havelock Ellis after Ellis's death in 1939. He also contributed to the Birth Control Review. In 1934, he published Arms and the Clergy, a compilation of clerical declarations made during the First World War. His last work, Prayer: An Indictment, published in 1938, was a secular criticism of prayer.

In 1927, Bedborough emigrated to the United States, settling in Chicago, and applied to be naturalised. His occupation was listed as "author and literary advisor"; his wife was recorded as living in Mayville, Wisconsin. Bedborough returned to the United Kingdom in 1931 on the RMS Aquitania.

Bedborough later moved to Cambridge. He died there on 7 August 1940, aged 72.

== Publications ==
- Narcotics and a Few Stimulants. 1913.
- Vacant Chaff Well Meant for Grain. 1914.
- Stories from the "Children's Realm". Vegetarian Federal Union. 1914.
- Wordsworth: A Lecture. Letchworth: Garden City Press. 1913.
- The Bright Side and Other Verses. Letchworth: Garden City Press. 1915.
- The Dogs of War, and Other Stories. Letchworth: Garden City Press. 1915.
- Vulgar Fractions. Letchworth: Garden City Press. 1915.
- Subtilty to the Simple. Letchworth: Garden City Press. 1916.
- Harmony or Humbug? An Examination of Mr. Ralph Waldo Trine's Book "In Tune with the Infinite". Letchworth: Garden City Press. 1917.
- Love and Happiness: Letters to Tolstoy, Written in 1897 and Now First Published. Letchworth: Garden City Press. 1917.
- Sayings of George Bedborough. Letchworth: Garden City Press. 1917.
- The Will to Love. Letchworth: Garden City Press. 1917.
- Dark Sayings, with Some Fair Ones. Letchworth: Garden City Press. 1918.
- Not Only Men. Letchworth: Garden City Press. 1918.
- The Atheist. Letchworth: Garden City Press. 1919.
- Arms and the Clergy, 1914–1918. London: Pioneer Press. 1934.
- Prayer: An Indictment. London: Pioneer Press. 1938.
