= Klein Vierstraat British Commonwealth War Graves Commission Cemetery =

WWI CWGC cemetery in Flanders, Belgium

Klein Vierstraat British
- Commonwealth War Graves Commission
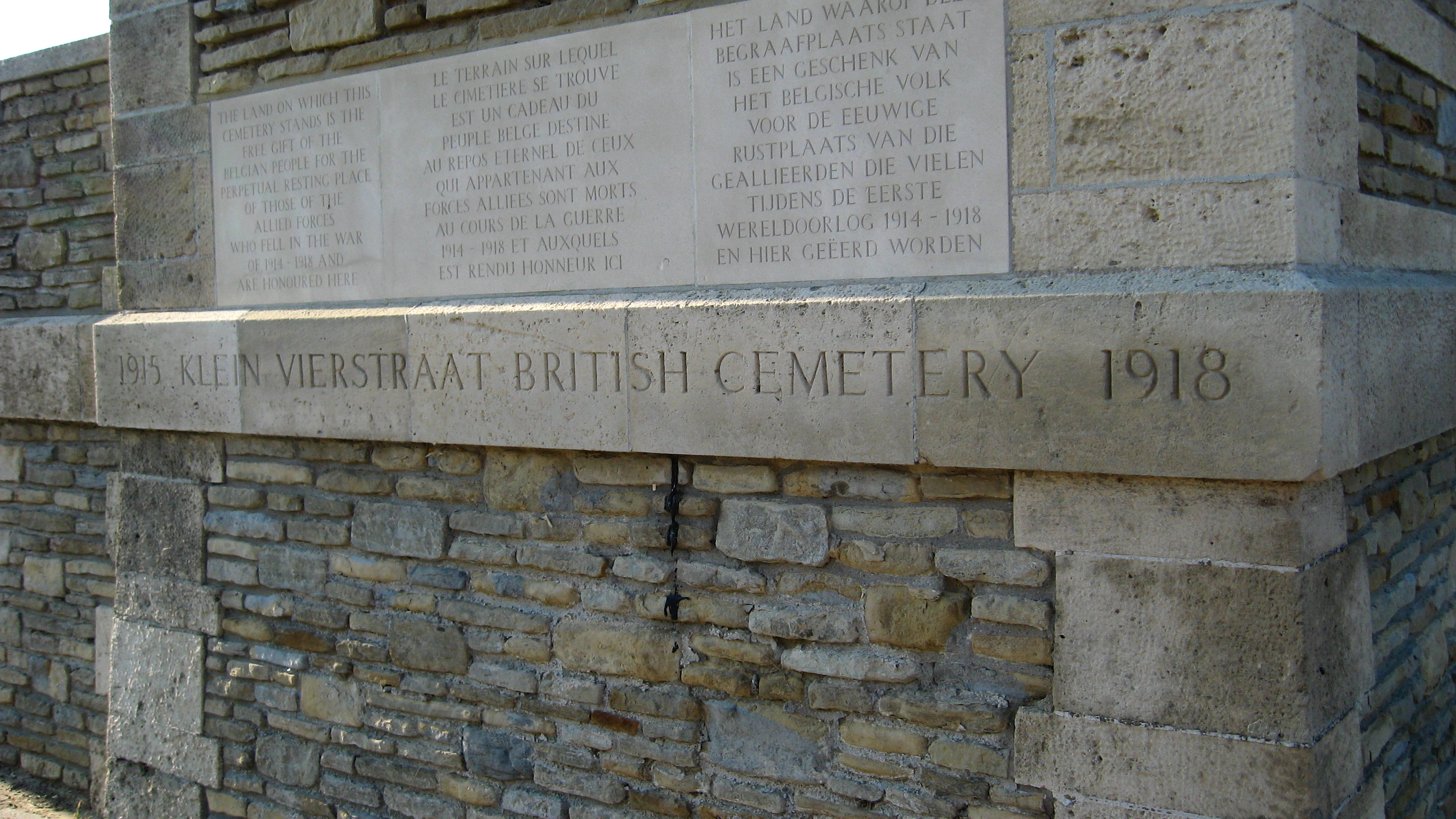
- Used for those deceased 1917–1918
- Established: 1917
- Location: 50°48′19″N 02°50′20″E near Heuvelland, West Flanders, Belgium
- Designed by: Sir Edwin Lutyens
- Total burials: 804
- Unknowns: 109

Burials by nation
- Allied Powers: United Kingdom 780; Australia 8; Canada 8; New Zealand 7; South Africa 1

Burials by war
- World War I: 804
- Statistics source: wo1.be and CWGC

Klein Vierstraat British Cemetery is a Commonwealth War Graves Commission (CWGC) burial ground for the dead of the First World War located in the Ypres Salient on the Western Front in Belgium.

The cemetery grounds were assigned to the United Kingdom in perpetuity by King Albert I of Belgium in recognition of the sacrifices made by the British Empire in the defence and liberation of Belgium during the war. The cemetery is approximately 0.3 hectares in size. The Kemmel Number 1 French Cemetery, also a First World War burial ground assigned to the United Kingdom, is located approximately 50 m to the east.

== Foundation ==
The cemetery was founded in January 1917 by fighting units and field ambulances.

It was designed by Sir Edwin Lutyens. Within the cemetery is a Cross of Sacrifice.

It was used after the Armistice to concentrate battlefield burials from Ferme Henri Pattyn Vanlaeres and Mont-Vidaigne Military cemeteries. An American soldier was buried here, but his body was later moved to Lijssenthoek Military Cemetery. Among those buried here is the children's illustrator and writer L. A. Hayter (I. H. 8.).
