= Legitimation League =

Defunct British advocacy organization

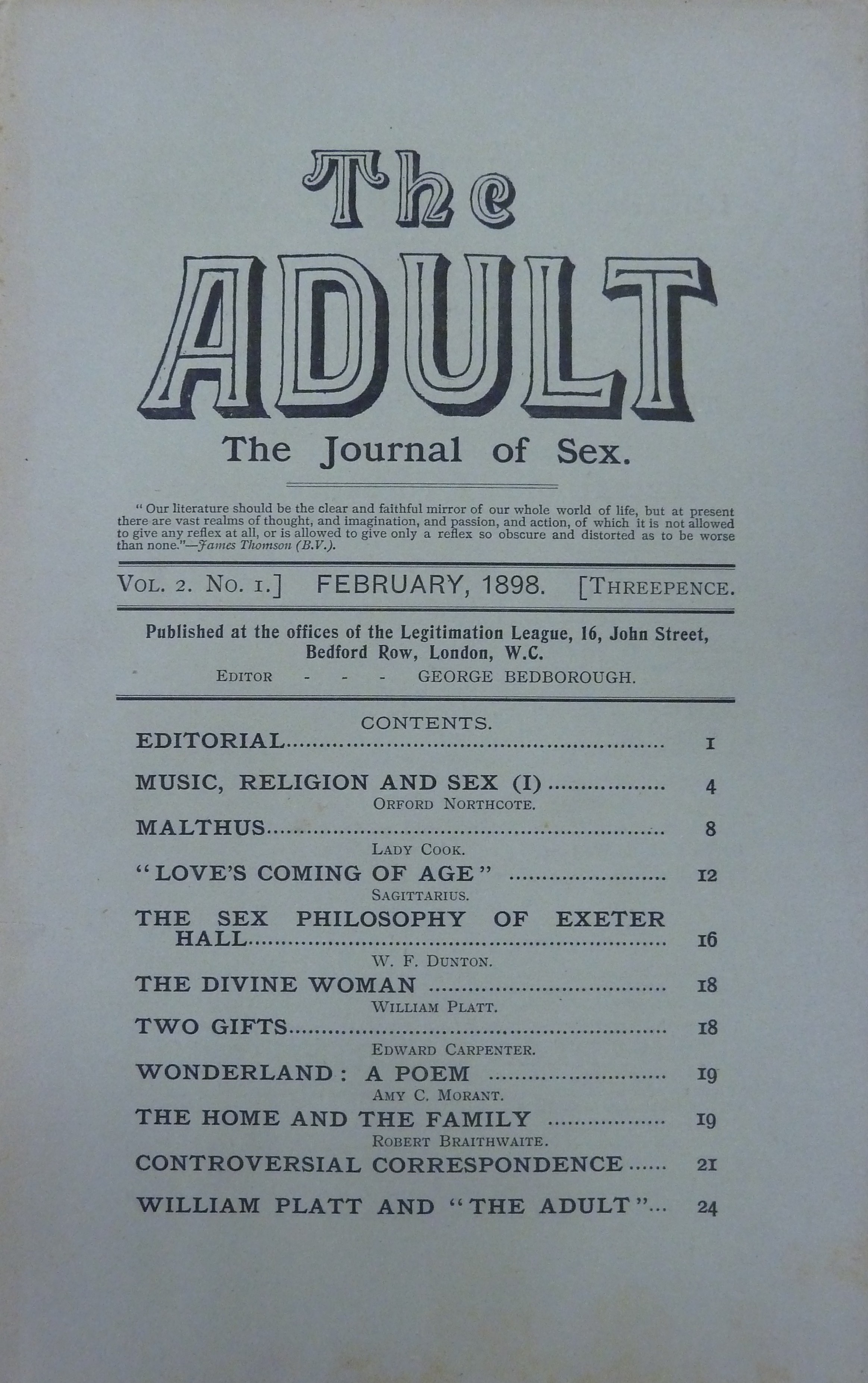
February 1898 edition of the Legitimation League's journal The Adult

The Legitimation League was a British advocacy organisation founded in Leeds in 1893. It campaigned for the legitimation of illegitimate children and was later associated with free love and sexual reform. Its journal, The Adult, was published from 1897 to 1899.

== History ==
=== Founding and early years ===
The association was founded in Leeds in 1893 by a group of individualist anarchists associated with Benjamin Tucker and his magazine Liberty. Founding members included John Badcock, Joseph Hiam Levy, Greevz Fisher, Wordsworth Donisthorpe, Gladys Dawson, and Oswald Dawson. Advocates associated with the organisation included the poet and socialist Edward Carpenter and the sexologist and social reformer Havelock Ellis.

In 1897, the League moved its headquarters to London, where its meetings drew larger audiences. In the same year, the anarchist and women's rights activist Lillian Harman became president of the League. Karen Hunt writes that the League's original focus was the legitimacy and equality of children born outside church- or state-sanctioned unions, but that sexual liberation later became its main aim. At this time, Donisthorpe, who had served as president since 1893, and Fisher, who had served as vice-president, left the association.

=== The Adult ===
The League's journal, The Adult, was published from 1897 to 1899, with the subtitles "A Journal for the Advancement of Freedom in Sexual Relationships" and "A Crusade Against Sex-Enslavement". Harman wrote several articles for the journal. It was originally edited by the League's secretary George Bedborough, whose wife Louie was treasurer, before his arrest in 1898 for selling a copy of Havelock Ellis's Studies in the Psychology of Sex Vol. 2.

According to Hunt, the League had been under surveillance by Scotland Yard as a suspected anarchist organisation, and Bedborough's arrest was used against it. After pleading guilty to an obscenity charge, Bedborough agreed not to remain associated with the League. Henry Seymour replaced Bedborough as editor until the journal's last issue in March 1899.

== Publications ==
- The Rights of Natural Children: Verbatim Report of the Inaugural Proceedings of the Legitimation League. London, Leeds: WM. Reeves, Geo. Cornwell. 1893.
- Donisthorpe, Wordsworth (1894). Love and Law: An Essay on Marriage. London: WM. Reeves.
- Dawson, Oswald, ed. (1895). The Bar Sinister and Licit Love: The First Biennial Proceedings of the Legitimation League. London, Leeds: WM. Reeves, Geo. Cornwell.
- Dawson, Oswald (1897). Personal Rights and Sexual Wrongs. London, Leeds: WM. Reeves, Geo. Cornwell.
- Dawson, Oswald (1897). The Legitimation League Meeting Announcement. London: Legitimation League.
- Dawson, Oswald (1898). The Outcome of Legitimation: A Lecture Delivered at the Holborn Restaurant, London, 6th December, 1897, under the Auspices of the Legitimation League, Mrs. Louie Bedborough in the Chair. London: Legitimation League.
