= Lillian Harman =

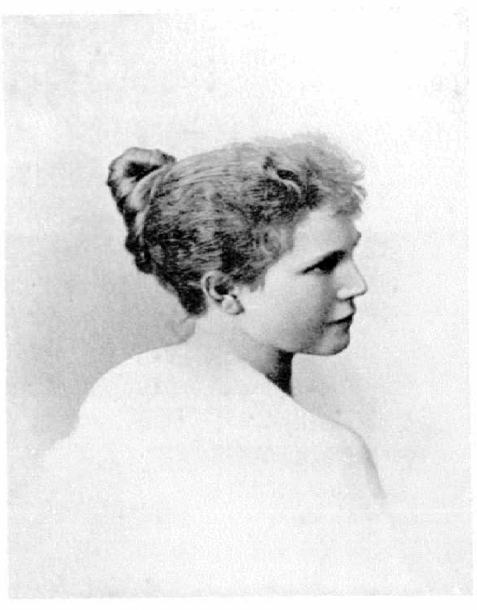
- Born: Lillian Susan Harman; December 23, 1869; Crawford County, Missouri
- Died: March 5, 1929
- Known for: Sex radical feminism
- Spouses: Edwin C. Walker (m. 1886) George R. O'Brien (m. 1907)
- Children: 2
- Father: Moses Harman

Lillian Susan Harman-O'Brien (née Harman; December 23, 1869 – March 5, 1929) was an American sex radical feminist and editor. Her father Moses Harman edited Lucifer, the Light-Bearer, a regional, weekly paper that introduced her to issues of women's sexual freedom. She became a national icon for that cause following her "free marriage", which took place outside state and church recognition, and her subsequent imprisonment. Upon her release, Harman edited multiple publications, including an anarchist periodical with her husband. Her work culminated with her being named president of a British organization that campaigned to legitimize non-marital sex. Her first child was born under a contract that stipulated the father's responsibilities in supporting the daughter. She moved from Kansas to Chicago, remarried, and had a son. Little is known about her life following the death of her father in 1910.

== Life and career ==
Harman was born on December 23, 1869, to Moses and Susan (née Scheuk or Shook) Harman in Crawford County, Missouri. She had a brother, George. After her mother's death when she was seven years old, her father moved the family to Valley Falls, Kansas, where he joined the National Liberal League. He coedited its paper, the Valley Falls Liberal, which he later renamed Lucifer, the Light-Bearer. His daughter would typeset the regional weekly paper at age thirteen and become steeped in issues of women's sexual freedom and the press's freedom to cover sexuality.

In 1886, at the age of sixteen, she defied Kansas marriage laws by entering a "free marriage" outside state and church authority with Edwin C. Walker two decades her elder. She protested the power that sanctioned marriages gave husbands over their wives' property, identity, and body. Harman was convicted for breaking the Kansas Marriage Act of 1867 and served prison time for almost half a year when she refused to pay court costs. The case's publicity made her a national icon for women's sexual freedom and spurred other feminists to debate age of consent and marital rape.

As the case's influence spread, Lucifer rode a wave of new subscribers to become America's pulpit for sex radicalism. Harman became more active in the paper's publication upon her release in 1887. The next year, she established an anarchist publication, Fair Play, which she published sporadically with her husband over the next two decades. She concurrently assisted her father with Our New Humanity and the American Journal of Eugenics, which subsided with his death in 1910.

Outside of publishing, Harman continued to pursue sex activism. She had a child in 1893 under terms that made her a "free mother". Harman made her husband, Walker, commit in writing to providing his portion of support for the daughter. Harman and Walker lived separately for most of their marriage. She became the president of the British Legitimation League, which campaigned to legitimize non-marital sex and preserve property and inheritance rights to their children, in 1897. Harman wrote for the league's journal and spoke against age of consent laws for their restriction of women's rights. Her advocacy brought her international recognition. In 1898, Harman was arrested for obscenity charges, along with George Bedborough.

Harman married George R. O'Brien, a Chicago newspaper printer and union leader, in the early 1900s. Their son, George Harman O'Brien, became a lawyer, and her daughter with Walker, Virna Winifred Walker, became a musician and dancer. Little is recorded about her life between the death of her father in 1910 and her own death in 1929.

== Selected works ==
- Some Problems of Social Freedom (1898)
- Marriage and Mortality (1900)
- The Regeneration of Society (1900)

== Bibliography ==
- McElroy, Wendy (2001). "Edwin Cox Walker and Lillian Harman: A Feminist Couple". Individualist Feminism of the Nineteenth Century: Collected Writings and Biographical Profiles. McFarland. pp. 125–134. ISBN 978-0-7864-0775-0.
- Passet, Joanne E. (2007). "Harman, Lillian". In Dawkins, Richard (ed.). The New Encyclopedia of Unbelief. Prometheus Books. pp. 377–378. ISBN 978-1-61592-280-2.
