= Personal Rights Association =

From The Individualist, February 1903

The body which became the Personal Rights Association (PRA) was founded in England in 1871.

== History ==
The 1913 Annual Report of the PRA records that "On 14 March 1871, a meeting largely attended by sympathisers from various parts of England, was held in Manchester, to consider the possibility of forming a National League or Association for watching, restraining, and influencing legislation, especially in matters affecting the interests of women, and the personal rights and liberties of the people".

A conference was held on 14 November in Liverpool and the Vigilance Association was founded. The first issue of a journal was published on 15 January 1881 with the title Journal of the Vigilance Association for the Defence of Personal Rights. The quotation below the journal title was from Pierre-Joseph Proudhon "The price of liberty is eternal vigilance". The 240th issue of the Journal, for February 1903, explained the reason for changing the title to The Individualist ('Monthly Journal of Personal Rights') was that it would 'be a more distinctive name'. The graphic design of the journal's title showed its editorial policy resting on the twin pillars of "Freedom as wide as possible" and "Equality before the law". The 1903 editorial explained that 'We shall not swerve from the principle which our little Society has persistently proclaimed for nearly a third of a century. If the tide were running strongly in our favour, it might then be argued with some show of plausibility, but not so as to convince us, that we might rest and be thankful. But the tide is running strongly against us. Socialism is in the air. Tyranny has assumed the garb of ethics, and Privilege essays to purchase for itself a renewed lease of life by "ransom" paid out of the pockets of its victims. Never was there a time when it was more necessary for the lovers of freedom and justice to be up and doing'. This was a time of debate between the proponents of individualism and socialism.

The 1913 Annual Report of the Personal Rights Association contained a reflective Presidential Address by Mr Franklin Thomasson. He reported that 'Since last we met, the Personal Rights Association has suffered a loss which it is impossible to exaggerate, in the death of our friend and leader Mr. Levy' and explained that Mr J H Levy was prominent in the affairs of the Personal Rights Association. He was described by Thomasson as 'a profound logician, an economist of high order, and had made the study of ethics his own'. Joseph Hiam Levy published books on these subjects and on Jewish issues. Thomasson summarised the work of the PRA: 'it has done effective reform work in the matter of Prison Law, Marriage Laws, Corporal Punishment in the Army and out of it, Liquor Law, Anti-Vaccination, Anti-Vivisection, Education, Women's Questions, Factory Laws, Capital Punishment, and many other questions, besides numerous instances of individual oppression and injustice' (1913 Report, page 19). One of the most prominent cases taken up by the PRA was that of Miss Jessie Brown. The offices of the PRA were at 11 Abbeville Road London, SW. The PRA survived until the death of its editor, Henry Meulen in 1978, it which time it was run from his home at No. 31 Parkside Gardens, London SW19. A final issue was produced under the editorship of Pauline Russell.

== See also ==
- Henry Meulen
