= Florence I. Nicholson =

English vegetarianism activist (1866–1931)

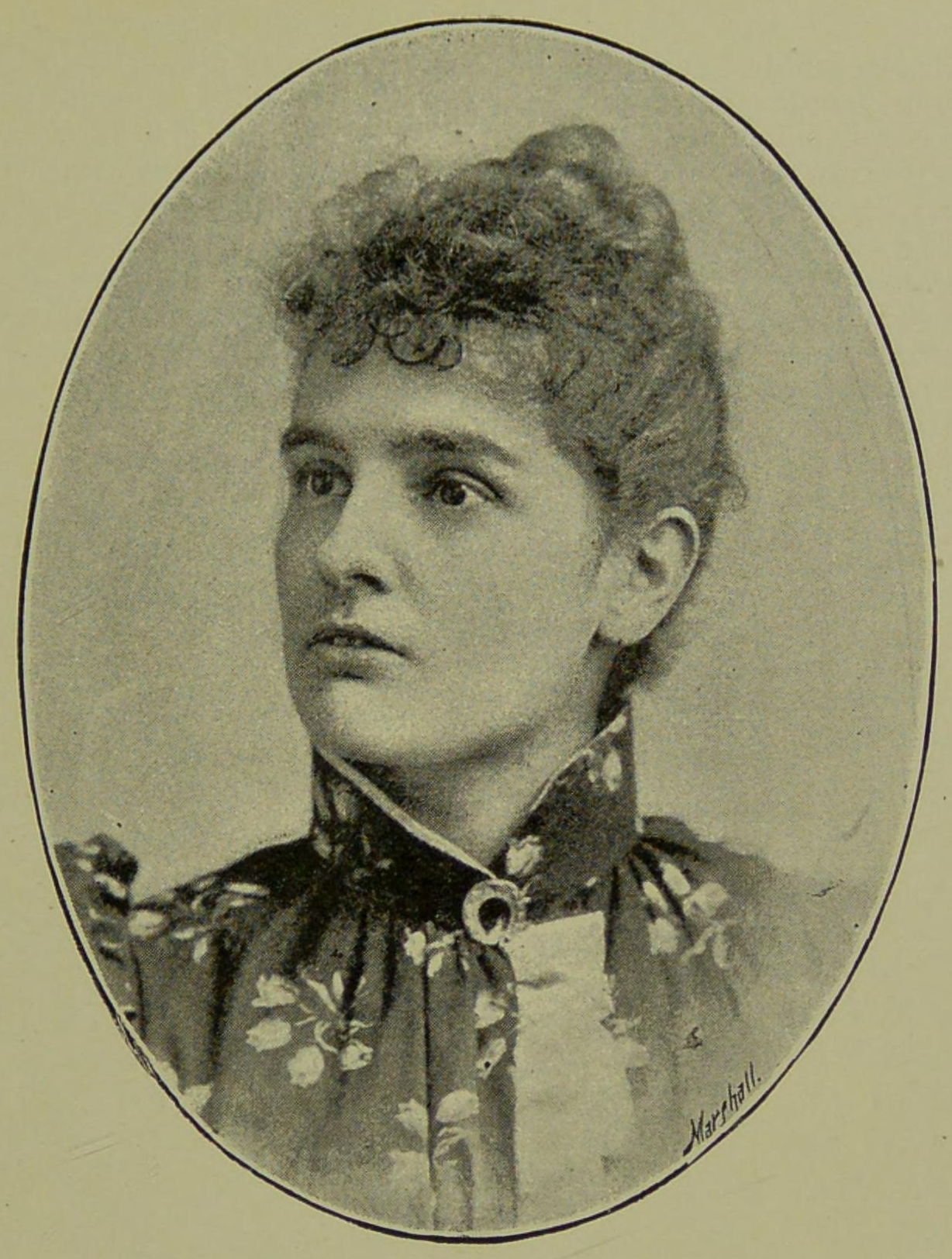
- Nicholson in Fifty Years of Food Reform (1898)
- Born: Florence Isabel Nicholson; 1866; Barleythorpe, Rutland, England
- Died: 13 January 1931 (aged 64); Godstone, Surrey, England
- Other name: Florence Isabel Field
- Occupation: Vegetarianism activist
- Organizations: London Vegetarian Society; London Vegetarian Association; Vegetarian Federal Union
- Notable work: The Jubilee Cookery Book (1897); The Children's Realm (editor)
- Spouse: Arthur C. Field (m. 1919)

Florence Isabel Field (née Nicholson; 1866 – 13 January 1931) was an English vegetarianism activist. She worked in London vegetarian organisations in the 1890s and later served as secretary of the Vegetarian Federal Union. She published The Jubilee Cookery Book (1897) and was the first editor of The Children's Realm, a vegetarian children's magazine.

== Biography ==
=== Early life ===
Nicholson was born in 1866 at Barleythorpe, Rutland, to Thomas Nicholson and Isabella Nicholson.

=== Vegetarian activism ===
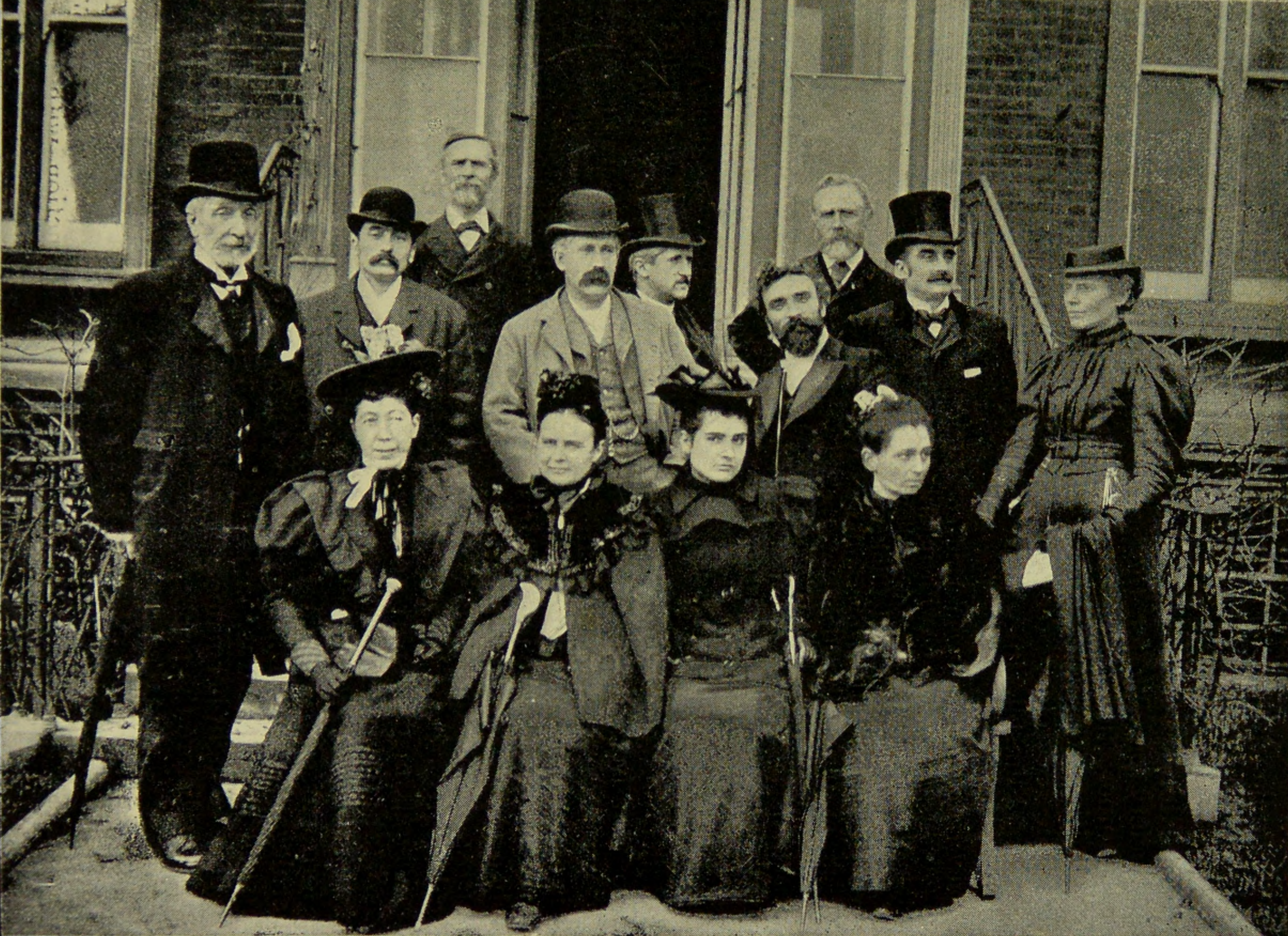
Delegates at the Vegetarian Congress at Brighton in 1894; Nicholson is seated in the front row, second from right

Nicholson originally intended to pursue a literary career, but became a vegetarian after she was appointed assistant secretary of the London Vegetarian Society.

In the 1890s, Nicholson worked in the office of the London Vegetarian Association. According to Charles W. Forward's Fifty Years of Food Reform, May Yates suggested that Nicholson should be appointed to assist her after the association's work increased. Forward stated that Nicholson had previously worked with Yates on an exhibition and that, although she was not then a vegetarian, she was appointed. After Yates resigned, Nicholson became secretary of the association.

Hilda Kean writes that Nicholson established a children's dinner fund for underfed children, distributing cheap meals of vegetable soup, wholemeal bread and wholemeal currant bread.

By 1907, Nicholson was secretary of the Vegetarian Federal Union. In October that year, Good Health named her, with C. Herman Senn and the magazine's editor, as a judge for a Christmas cookery competition.

=== Writing and editing ===
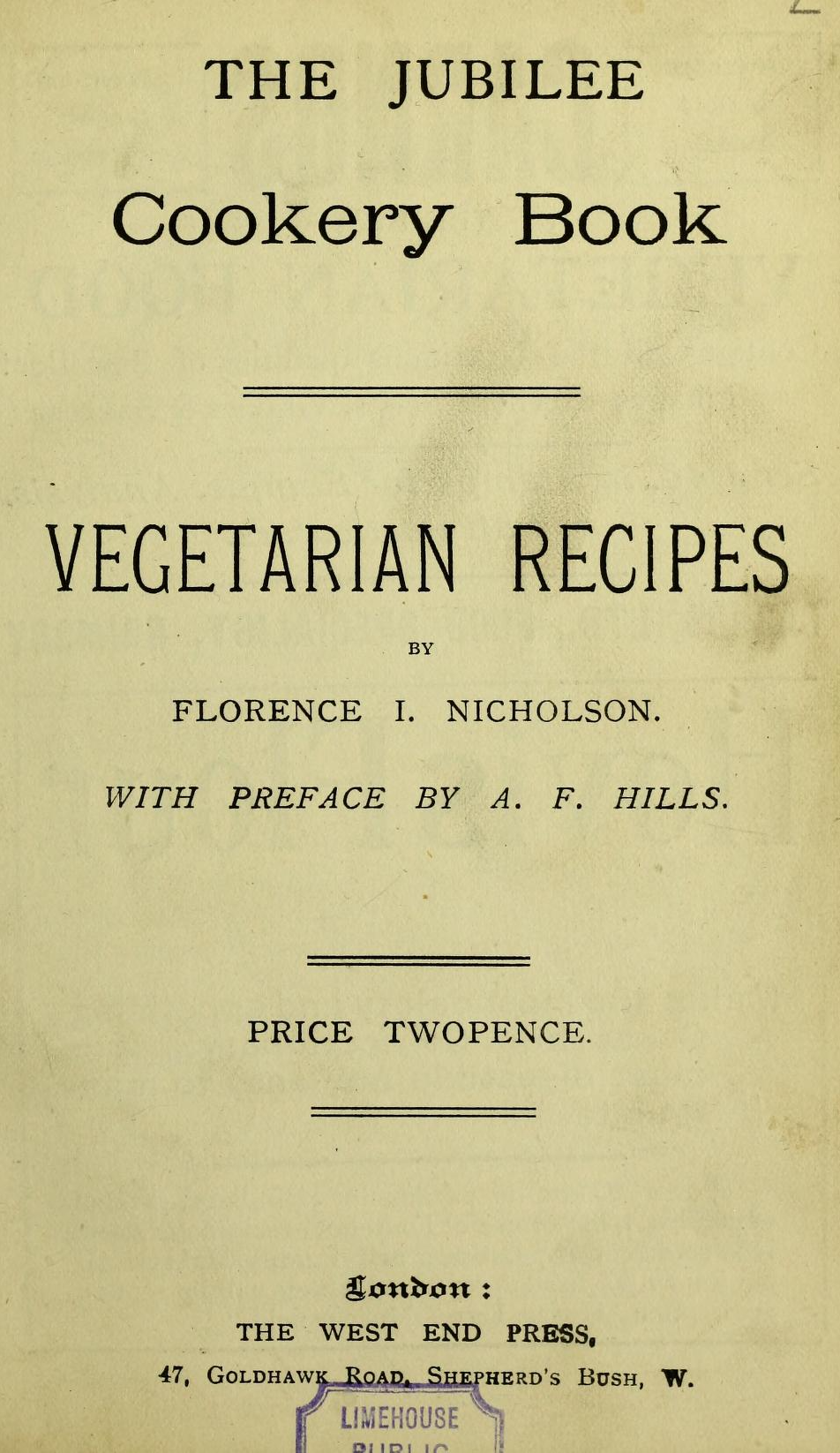
Title page of The Jubilee Cookery Book (1897)

In 1897, Nicholson published The Jubilee Cookery Book: Vegetarian Recipes, with a preface by Arnold Hills. The book gave weekly menus and recipes for vegetarian meals, including soups, savouries, puddings and pies.

In 1898, Nicholson published early recipes for vegetarian sausages and a vegetarian shepherd's pie in The Vegetarian.

Nicholson was the first editor of The Children's Realm, a monthly vegetarian magazine for children founded in 1906 and published by the Vegetarian Federal Union. She was later succeeded by A. M. Cole.

=== Personal life and death ===
Nicholson married Arthur C. Field at Godstone, Surrey, in 1919. He was a vegetarianism activist and a member of the council of the London Vegetarian Society.

Nicholson died on 13 January 1931 in Godstone, aged 64.

== Publications ==
- The Jubilee Cookery Book: Vegetarian Recipes. London: West End Press. 1897.
- Economy in the Kitchen. With A. M. Cole. London. 1904.
- The Children's Realm (editor)

== See also ==
- History of vegetarianism
- Vegetarianism in the Victorian era
- Vegetarianism in the United Kingdom
- Women and vegetarianism and veganism advocacy
