= List of battalions of the Bedfordshire and Hertfordshire Regiment =

This is a list of battalions of the Bedfordshire and Hertfordshire Regiment, which existed as an infantry regiment of the British Army from 1881 to 1958.

== Original composition ==
When the 16th (Bedfordshire) Regiment of Foot became The Bedfordshire Regiment in 1881 under the Cardwell-Childers reforms of the British Armed Forces, five pre-existent militia and volunteer battalions of Bedfordshire and Hertfordshire were integrated into the structure of the regiment. Volunteer battalions had been created in reaction to a perceived threat of invasion by France in the late 1850s. Organised as "rifle volunteer corps", they were independent of the British Army and composed primarily of the middle class. The only change to the regiment's structure during the period of 1881–1908, was the addition of a 4th volunteer battalion in 1900, being the 4th Volunteer Battalion, later renamed to 4th (Huntingdonshire) Volunteer Battalion.

Battalion	Formed	Formerly
Regular
1st	1688	
2nd	1859	
Militia
3rd (Militia)	1760	Bedfordshire Light Infantry Militia
4th (Militia)	1758	Hertfordshire Militia
Volunteers
1st (Hertfordshire) Volunteer	1861	1st Hertfordshire Rifle Volunteers
2nd (Hertfordshire) Volunteer	1860	2nd Hertfordshire Rifle Volunteers
3rd (Bedfordshire) Volunteer	1860	1st Bedfordshire Rifle Volunteer Corps

== Reorganisation ==
The Territorial Force (later Territorial Army) was formed in 1908, which the volunteer battalions joined, while the militia battalions transferred to the "Special Reserve". All volunteer battalions were renumbered to create a single sequential order. The Hertfordshire Battalion created during the reforms, left the Bedfordshire Regiment completely in 1909 to create the Hertfordshire Regiment.

Battalion	Formerly
5th	Amalgamation of 3rd (Bedfordshire) and 4th (Huntingdonshire) Volunteer Battalions
The Hertfordshire Battalion	Amalgamation of 1st and 2nd (Hertfordshire) Volunteer Battalions

== First World War ==
The Bedfordshire Regiment fielded 26 battalions and lost around 7,200 officers and other ranks during the course of the war. The regiment's territorial component formed duplicate second and third line battalions. As an example, the three-line battalions of the 5th Beds were numbered as the 1/5th, 2/5th, and 3/5th respectively. Many battalions of the regiment were formed as part of Secretary of State for War Lord Kitchener's appeal for an initial 100,000 men volunteers in 1914. They were referred to as the New Army or Kitchener's Army. The Volunteer Training Corps were raised with overage or reserved occupation men early in the war, and were initially self-organised into many small corps, with a wide variety of names. Recognition of the corps by the authorities brought regulation and as the war continued the small corps were formed into battalion sized units of the county Volunteer Regiment. In 1918 these were linked to county regiments.

Battalion	Formed	Served	Fate
Regular
1st	1688	Western Front, Italy	
2nd	1859	Western Front	
Special Reserve
3rd (Reserve)	1760	Britain	
4th (Extra Reserve)	1758	Western Front	
Territorial Force
1/5th	1908	Gallipoli, Sinai and Palestine campaign	
2/5th	Bedford, September 1914	Britain	Disbanded on 18 March 1918
3/5th, 5th (Reserve) from 8 April 1916	Bedford, June 1915	Britain	Disbanded in March 1919
11th	Lowestoft, 1 January 1917, from 68th Provisional Battalion (Territorial Force)	Britain	Disbanded in 1919
New Army
6th (Service)	Bedford, August 1914	Western Front	Disbanded on 4 August 1918
7th (Service)	Bedford, September 1914	Western Front	Absorbed into the 2nd Battalion
8th (Service)	Bedford, September 1914	Western Front	Disbanded on 16 February 1918
9th (Reserve)	Felixstowe, October 1914	Britain	Absorbed into the Training Reserve Battalions of the 6th Reserve Brigade
10th (Reserve)	Dovercourt, November 1914	Britain	Became the 27th Training Reserve Battalion of the 6th Reserve Brigade
Others
12th (Transport Workers)	December 1916	Britain	Disbanded 1919
13th (Transport Workers)	December 1916	Britain	Disbanded 1919
1st Garrison	Bedford, December 1915	India	Disbanded 1920
2nd Garrison	Bedford, December 1916	India	Disbanded 1920
3rd Garrison	Bedford, January 1917	India, Burma	Disbanded 1920
51st (Graduated)	Colchester, 27 October 1917, from the 249th Graduated Battalion	Britain	Disbanded 1919
52nd (Graduated)	Colchester, 27 October 1917, from the 252nd Graduated Battalion	Britain	Became a service battalion 1919; disbanded 1920
53rd (Young Soldier)	Clipstone, 27 October 1917, from the 27th Training Reserve Battalion	Britain	Disbanded 1920
Volunteer Training Corps
1st Battalion Bedfordshire Volunteer Regiment later the 1st Volunteer Battalion, Bedfordshire Regiment		Bedford	Disbanded post war
2nd Battalion Bedfordshire Volunteer Regiment later the 2nd Volunteer Battalion, Bedfordshire Regiment		Luton	Disbanded post war
1st Battalion Hertfordshire Volunteer Regiment later the 1st Volunteer Battalion, Hertfordshire Regiment		Hereford	Disbanded post war
2nd Battalion Hertfordshire Volunteer Regiment later the 2nd Volunteer Battalion, Hertfordshire Regiment		Watford	Disbanded post war
3rd Battalion Hertfordshire Volunteer Regiment later the 3rd Volunteer Battalion, Hertfordshire Regiment		St Albans	Disbanded post war

== Inter-War ==
By 1921, all of the regiment's war-raised battalions had disbanded. The Special Reserve reverted to its militia designation in 1921, then to the Supplementary Reserve in 1924; however, its battalions were effectively placed in 'suspended animation'. As World War II approached, the Territorial Army was reorganised in the mid-1930s, many of its infantry battalions were converted to other roles, especially anti-aircraft. The regiment was renamed the Bedfordshire and Hertfordshire Regiment, in 1919, in recognition of the large amounts of soldiers from Hertfordshire that fought in the Great War.

== Second World War ==
The Bedfordshire's expansion during the Second World War was modest compared to 1914–1918. National Defence Companies were combined to create a new "Home Defence" battalion. In addition to this, 23 battalions of the Home Guard were affiliated to the regiment, eight battalions in Bedfordshire wearing the cap badge of Bedfordshire and Hertfordshire Regiment and the 15 battalions in Hertfordshire wearing the cap badge of the Hertfordshire Regiment. A number of Light Anti-Aircraft (LAA) troops were formed from the local battalions to defend specific points, such as factories. Due to the daytime (or shift working) occupations of these men, the batteries required eight times the manpower of an equivalent regular battery.

Battalion	Formed	Served	Fate
Regular
1st	1688	Crete, North Africa, India, Burma	See Post-World War II
2nd	1859	Dunkirk, Britain, North Africa, Tunisia, Italy, Greece	See Post-World War II
Territorial Army
5th	1908	Britain, Malaya, Singapore	See Post-World War II
6th	1939	Britain	Disbanded in 1947
7th (Home Defence)	1939	Britain	Disbanded? in 1941
2/7th (Home Defence)	1940	Britain	Disbanded? in 1940
8th	1940	Britain	Disbanded? in 1942
9th	1940	Britain	Disbanded in 1946
10th (Home Defence)	1940	Britain	Redesignated as 30th Battalion in 1941
30th	Redesignation of 10th (Home Defence) Battalion, 1941	Britain	Disbanded 1946
Others
50th (Holding)	1940	Britain	Redesignated as the ? Battalion, 1940
70th (Young Soldier)	1940	Britain	Disbanded 1943
71st (Young Soldier)	1940	Britain	Disbanded 1943

Home Guard
Battalion	Headquarters	Formation Sign (dark blue on khaki)	Battalion	Headquarters	Formation Sign (dark blue on khaki)
Bedfordshire
1st	Bedford	BDF 1	2nd	Biggleswade	BDF 2
3rd	Ampthill	BDF 3	4th	Luton	BDF 4
5th	Bedford	BDF 5	6th	Dunstable	BDF 6
7th	Luton	BDF 7	8th	Bedford	BDF 8
Hertfordshire
1st	Much Hadham	HTS 1	2nd	Hitchin	HTS 2
3rd	Hertford	HTS 3	4th	Welwyn	HTS 4
5th	Harpenden	HTS 5	6th	Oxhay	HTS 6
7th	Chipperfield	HTS 7	8th	Croxley Green	HTS 8
9th	Bricket Wood	HTS 9	10th	Watford	HTS 10
11th	Bishop's Stortford	HTS 11	12th	Letchworth	HTS 12
13th (de Havilland)	Hatfield	HTS 13	14th	Hatfield	HTS 14
15th	St. Albans	HTS 15			
Home Guard Anti-Aircraft units
Formation Sign (dark blue on khaki)	Headquarters or Location	AA Formation and Designation	Formation Sign (dark blue on khaki)	Headquarters or Location	AA Formation and Designation
BDF 4	Luton, Skefco Ball Bearing Co. Ltd	A Troop LAA	BDF 7	Luton, Vauxhall Motors Ltd	C Troop (LAA)
BDF 7	Luton, Percival Aircraft Ltd	B Troop LAA	HTS 13	Harfield, de Havilland Aircraft Co. Ltd	A, C Troops LAA
HTS 13	Watford, de Havilland Aircraft Co. Ltd	B Troop LAA	HTS 15	Radlett, Handley Page Ltd	A Troop LAA

== Post-World War II ==
In the immediate post-war period, the army was significantly reduced: nearly all infantry regiments had their first and second battalions amalgamated and the Supplementary Reserve disbanded.

Battalion	Fate
1st	Amalgamated with the 2nd Battalion on 18 October 1948, without a change in title
2nd	Amalgamated with the 1st Battalion on 18 October 1948

== Amalgamation ==
The size of the British Army was reduced following the publication of the 1957 Defence White Paper. A policy of grouping regiments in administrative brigades, and amalgamating pairs of regular battalions was inaugurated. Accordingly, the 1st Battalions of the Bedfordshire and Hertfordshire Regiment and the Essex Regiment were merged to form the 3rd East Anglian Regiment (16th/44th Foot) on 2 June 1958, which itself became part of a new "large regiment": the Royal Anglian Regiment in 1964. The regiment's modern lineage is continued directly by D Company, 2nd Battalion of The Royal Anglian Regiment

Battalion	Fate
1st	Amalgamated with the 1st Battalion, The Essex Regiment to form 1st Battalion, 3rd East Anglian Regiment
5th	Redesignated as The Bedfordshire Regiment (TA), before merging with the 1st Battalion, The Hertfordshire Regiment in 1961, to form The Bedfordshire and Hertfordshire Regiment (TA)
