= Henry Meulen =

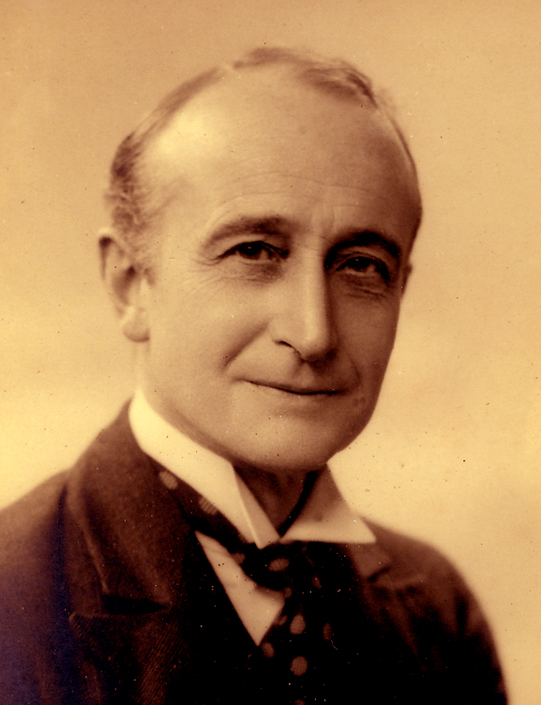
- Born: 1881
- Died: 1978 (aged 96–97)
- Occupation: Free banking proponent

Henry Meulen (1881–1978) was a British free banking proponent. Meulen was very involved with different British libertarian advocacy organizations, mainly the Personal Rights Association.

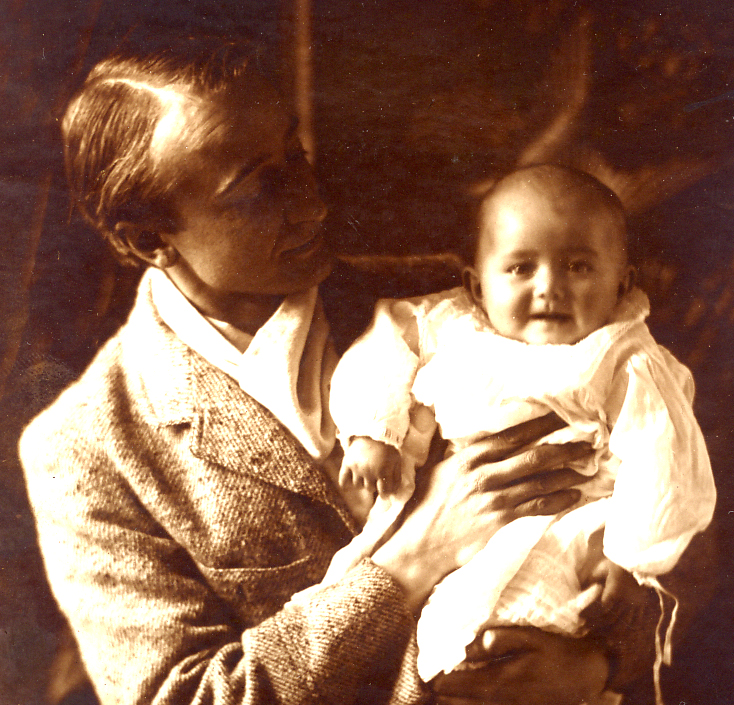
Meulen with his daughter, Paula, 1910s

== Selected works ==
- Meulen, Henry. Banking and the Social Problem. 1909
- Meulen, Henry. Free banking. 1934.
- Meulen, Henry. Free Banking. An outline of a policy of individualism. 1934
- Meulen, Henry. Individualist Anarchism (Reprinted from "The Word," November 1949. With a portrait.) 1949
- Meulen, Henry. Industrial Justice through Banking Reform. An outline of a policy of individualism. 1917
- The price of gold. By T. Goeritz and H. Meulen. 3rd ed. 1972
