= W. B. Shearn =

English businessman, florist, and activist

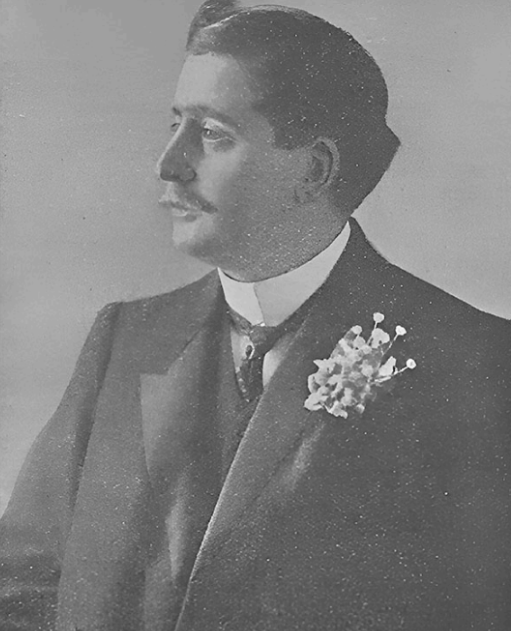
- Shearn, c. 1907
- Born: William Benjamin Shearn; 1872; St Giles, Middlesex, England
- Died: 12 January 1938 (aged 65); London, England
- Resting place: St. Pancras Cemetery, London, England
- Occupations: Businessman; florist; vegetarianism activist
- Spouse: Ella Masterson (m. 1914)
- Children: 1

William Benjamin Shearn (1872 – 12 January 1938) was an English businessman, florist, and vegetarianism activist, who promoted a fruitarian way of living. He managed a fruitarian restaurant at Tottenham Court Road.

== Biography ==
=== Early life ===
Shearn was born in the first quarter of 1872 in St. Giles, Middlesex. He was christened on 11 February 1880 at Saint John the Evangelist, Charlotte Street, Camden.

=== Career ===
Shearn's father Benjamin Shearn (1829–1913) was the owner of the first fruitarian restaurant in London, established in 1905. The restaurant was positioned above his fruit store at 231-234 Tottenham Court Road, that were both managed by Shearn. The ground floor was a florist and greengrocer and the two upper floors belonged to the restaurant. The restaurant served nutmeat. Alfred Perlès described it as "probably the best vegetarian restaurant in the world, with the emphasis on a fruitarian diet". Customers would pay two shillings to consume as much fruit and nuts that they could eat with a cup of coffee, cream and brown bread and butter. Shearn is credited with introducing grapefruit and "fruit lunch" to the British public. Shearn's company advertised itself as the "World's Largest Fruitarian Stores".

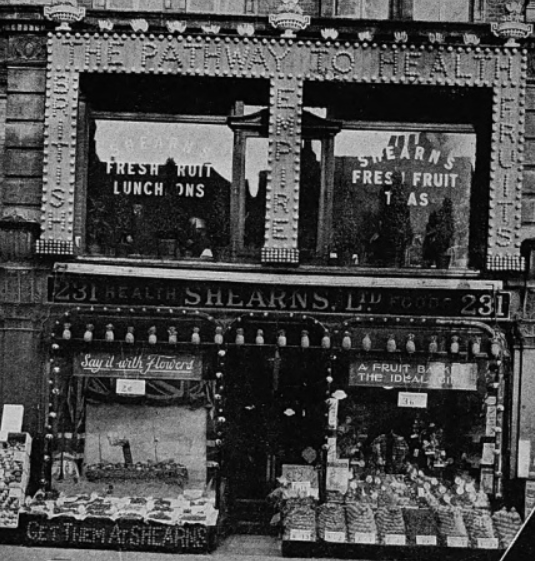
Shearn's fruitarian store in 1927

The restaurant contained a fruit saloon luncheon room that became a popular meeting place for members of the London Vegetarian Society. Shearn cooperated with The Children's Realm, a children's vegetarian magazine published by the London Vegetarian Society and Vegetarian Federal Union. Advertisements for his store were featured in the magazine. In 1907, Shearn offered a basket of fruit as an award for the best "Why I am a Vegetarian" children's essay. He organized parties for vegetarian children at his restaurant.

In 1909, Shearn donated 2000 oranges for poor children in London. He was the first president of the British division of the Florists Telegraph Delivery Association. Shearn was the editor of The Practical Fruiterer and Florist.

Shearn visited the United States in 1933, where he received the title of "Ambassador of the Floral Kingdom of England".

=== Personal life and death ===
Shearn was a vegetarian but preferred the term fruitarian. His diet consisted of fruit, nuts and vegetables with dairy products and eggs.

Shearn married Ella Masterson at St Giles in the Fields in 1914. Their wedding was described as a "fruitarian wedding" as Ella wore cherries in her hair and the bridesmaids carried baskets of fruit. The vegetarian meal served for over a hundred guests in a room decorated as a fruit and flower garden was a Brazil nut cutlet, mock chicken made from almonds and pine kernels, savoury nuts with cucumber and an egg gateau. Shearn stated that "I am such a firm believer in fruit as a means of keeping fit and well that I determined to have a fruitarian wedding in order to popularise this form of diet". Shearn and Ella had one son born in 1916. He was Major John Benjamin Shearn.

Shearn died on 12 January 1938 in London. (Note: In the England & Wales Index of Wills and Administrations his place of death is listed at University College Hospital London, but The Observer obituary states that he died at his home.) He was buried in St. Pancras Cemetery. His fruit store was closed in 1961.

== Selected publications ==
- The Practical Fruiterer and Florist (3 volumes, 1935)
