= Of Victorians and Vegetarians =

2007 book by James Gregory

- First edition cover
- Author: James Gregory
- Language: English
- Subject: Vegetarianism in the Victorian era
- Publisher: Tauris Academic Studies
- Publication date: 27 June 2007
- Publication place: United Kingdom
- Media type: Print (hardback)
- Pages: xii, 313
- ISBN: 978-1-84511-379-7
- OCLC: 237138383
- Website: bloomsbury.com/uk/of-victorians-and-vegetarians-9781845113797

Of Victorians and Vegetarians: The Vegetarian Movement in Nineteenth-century Britain is a 2007 book by British historian James Gregory, published by Tauris Academic Studies, an imprint of I.B. Tauris. It traces the organised vegetarian movement in Britain from c. 1838 to 1901, concentrating on its societies, members, publications and everyday practices. Gregory also examines Victorian arguments about vegetarianism, including those concerning health, animal welfare, religion, politics, class and gender.

== Background ==
James Gregory is an associate professor of modern British history at the University of Plymouth. He completed a PhD in history at the University of Southampton in 2002.

The book is based on his doctoral thesis, The Vegetarian Movement in Britain c.1840-1901: A Study of Its Development, Personnel and Wider Connections, completed in May 2002. As part of this research, Gregory also compiled a biographical index of approximately 1,470 British vegetarians and food reformers active between c. 1837 – c. 1901.

== Publication history ==
Of Victorians and Vegetarians was first published in hardback in London by Tauris Academic Studies, an imprint of I.B. Tauris, on 27 June 2007. An ebook edition was published on 29 June 2007, followed by a paperback edition on 23 July 2020. The first edition's cover reproduces Gordon Browne's 1898 cartoon All A-Growing, All A-Blowing from Punch.

== Summary ==
In the introduction, Gregory sets out his approach to the movement's social history, drawing on vegetarian periodicals, society records and the papers of individual reformers to examine its membership and activities.

The history of the movement begins with the Concordium at Alcott House, the vegetarian Bible Christians and the founding of the Vegetarian Society in 1847. It traces the society's early activities, decline and revival from the 1870s, and the growth of provincial groups and the London Vegetarian Society under Arnold Hills. Among the organisers discussed are James Simpson, William Horsell and George Dornbusch. Lectures, public dinners and the vegetarian press provided ways to recruit members and publicise the cause.

Gregory examines vegetarian arguments about health, their relationship to temperance and alternative medicine, and responses from the medical profession. His account of the movement's ethical concerns covers animal suffering, opposition to vivisection, the Humanitarian League and other animal protection organisations. It also considers the religious beliefs of vegetarians, including spiritualism and esoteric traditions. The book also discusses vegetarianism among radicals, secularists and other reformers, as well as the frequent depiction of its supporters as eccentrics or faddists. Gregory argues that adherence to a vegetarian diet did not necessarily entail radical political views.

The account of everyday vegetarian practice draws on descriptions of individual diets, public banquets, restaurants and specialist food suppliers. He also examines the vegetarian press, including The Vegetarian Messenger and The Vegetarian, which advertised vegetarian products and reported the activities of societies and their members.

In his discussion of class, Gregory finds that the movement drew most of its supporters from the middle class and the better-off sections of the working class. Campaigns presented vegetarianism as an economical diet suitable for working people, but these appeals sometimes met opposition from socialists and labour organisations. Gregory examines women's work in vegetarian societies, particularly the Women's Vegetarian Union, and the restrictions imposed by prevailing ideas about women's domestic and public roles.

Gregory goes on to survey the treatment of vegetarianism in newspapers, satire, poetry and fiction, including Samuel Butler's Erewhon. In his conclusion, Gregory argues that the movement attracted only a minority of Victorians but contributed to contemporary discussion of diet. He also considers its contradictory attitudes towards modernity: vegetarians made use of new scientific ideas and urban institutions while criticising aspects of industrial society.

== Reception ==
Reviewing the book in The English Historical Review, Harriet Ritvo commented on the extent of Gregory's research and his account of vegetarian societies, regional divisions, food practices and middle-class membership. She questioned how closely the Victorian movement could be connected to modern vegetarianism. Ian Miller, writing in Medical History, welcomed the attention to meals, restaurants and banquets, and considered the study a contribution to the history of food and diet in Victorian Britain.

John K. Walton commended Gregory's use of the vegetarian press and his treatment of regional, class and gender differences in the Journal of Social History. He also identified minor errors and questioned the use of the term "zoophilia". In the Journal of British Studies, Margaret Puskar-Pasewicz regarded Victorian vegetarianism as a distinct movement in Gregory's account, rather than simply a branch of health reform, but found some of its wider themes insufficiently developed. Ryan Noah Shapiro, writing in Victorian Studies, commended the research into vegetarian practice, labour, science, medicine and gender, while finding the book's organisation uneven in places.

== See also ==
- Bibliography of veganism and vegetarianism
- History of vegetarianism
- Fifty Years of Food Reform – 1898 book by Charles W. Forward
- The Bloodless Revolution – 2006 book by Tristram Stuart

== Sources ==
- Gregory, James (2007). Of Victorians and Vegetarians: The Vegetarian Movement in Nineteenth-century Britain. London: Tauris Academic Studies. ISBN 978-1-84511-379-7.
