= James Wainwright (administrator) =

Sir James Wainwright
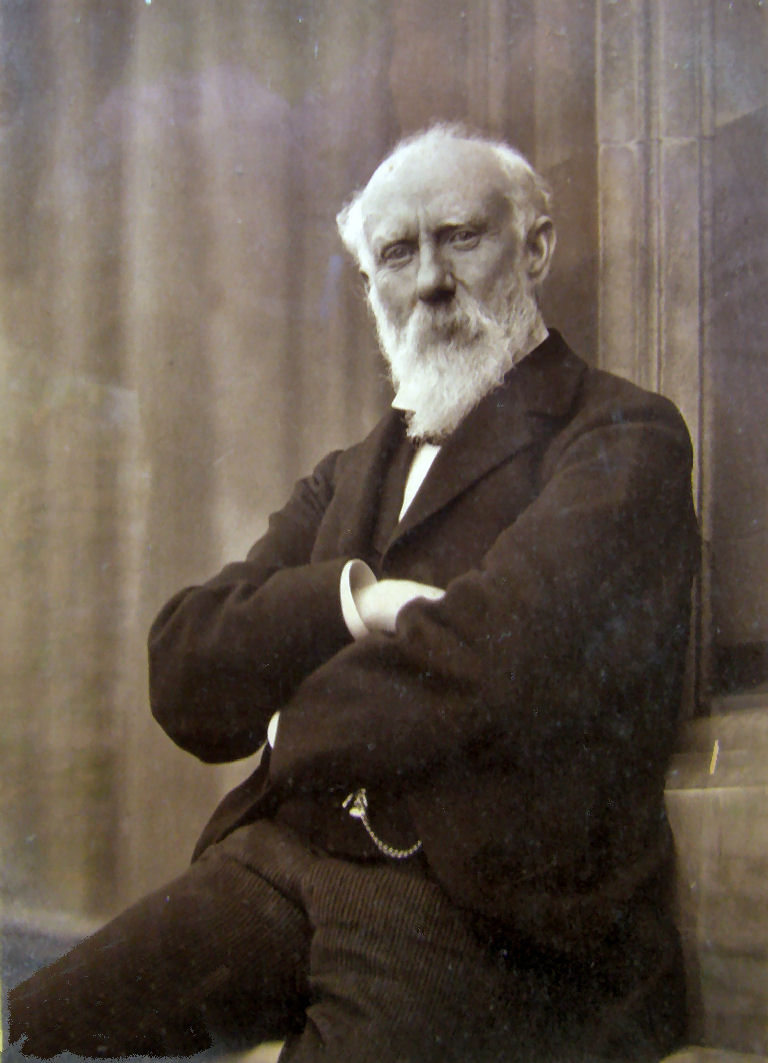
- date unknown
- Born: James Gadesden Wainwright; 23 December 1837
- Died: 19 February 1929 aged 91

Sir James Gadesden Wainwright (1837–1929) was a governor, almoner and treasurer of St Thomas' Hospital in London, England.

He was a cousin of Richard Wainwright and grandfather of Richard Wainwright Duke Turner.

== See also ==
- List of people from London
