= Moses Harman =

American schoolteacher and publisher (1830–1910)

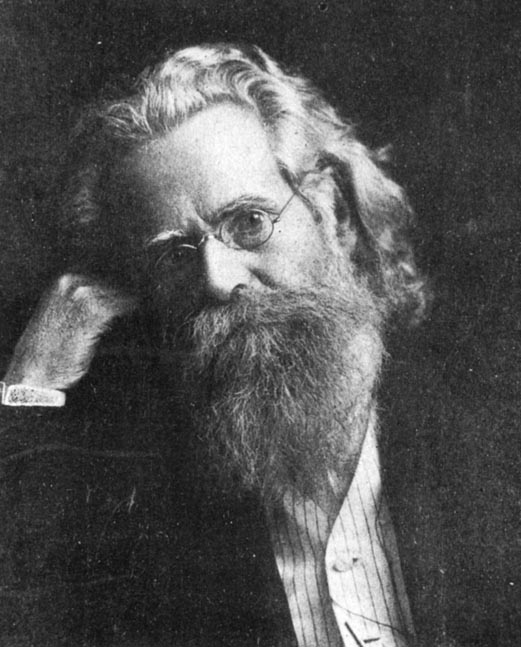
- Born: October 12, 1830; Pendleton County, West Virginia, US
- Died: January 30, 1910 (aged 79); Los Angeles, California, US
- Occupations: Schoolteacher, publisher
- Known for: Anarchism, women's rights
- Children: Lillian Harman

Moses Harman (October 12, 1830 – January 30, 1910) was an American schoolteacher and publisher notable for his staunch support for women's rights. He was prosecuted under the Comstock Law for content published in his anarchist periodical Lucifer, the Light-Bearer. He was arrested and jailed multiple times for publishing allegedly obscene material. His daughter, Lillian Harman, was also a notable anarchist.

== Biography ==
Harman was born on October 12, 1830, in Pendleton County, West Virginia to Job and Nancy Harman. Their family later moved to Crawford County, Missouri. Harman taught subscription school courses and attended Arcadia College. After completing his schoolwork, Harman worked as a Methodist circuit rider and teacher.

Harman married Susan Scheuck in 1866. Although they had several children, only two survived and Susan died in childbirth in 1877. Harman left the ministry and began his involvement with eugenics and social reform following Susan's death. In 1881, Harman edited the Kansas Liberal newspaper in Valley Falls, Kansas.

Harman was a vegetarian. He converted George Bedborough to vegetarianism after a visit to Harman's home in Chicago. Harman suggested they tour the meat-packing houses to test whether Bedborough would continue eating meat.

Harman has been credited as one of the founders of what became the eugenics movement. "He gave the spur and start to this effort. Through his journals, Lucifer, the Light-Bearer, later renamed The American Journal of Eugenics, encouraged by a small circle of earnest men and women, he dug down below the surface endeavoring to bring forth a stronger and better type of men".

In 1881, Harman co-edited the Valley Falls Liberal, and eventually became the editor. On August 24, 1883, Harman changed the name of the publication to Lucifer, the Light-Bearer. He moved the location of the newspaper several times for financial and philosophical reasons: to Topeka, Kansas, in 1890, to Chicago in 1896, and to Los Angeles in 1908. The name of the paper also changed to The American Journal of Eugenics in 1906.

Articles published in Lucifer discussed topics such as religion, relationships, and raising children. Through his work, Harman rejected all forms of religion and government, including marriage, and promoted freedom, love, wisdom, and the use of knowledge. Due to the radical nature of his views and publication, Harman constantly dealt with lawsuits, charges of immorality, ridicule, and issues with mailing what was considered obscene material through the United States Postal Service. Consequently, Harman was sentenced and released by courts several times in the 1890s.

He died on January 30, 1910, aged 79, in Los Angeles.

== Work in Lucifer, the Light-Bearer ==
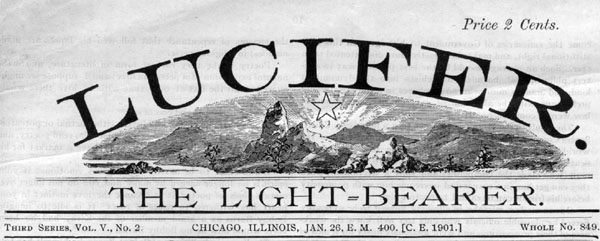
Lucifer The Light-Bearer cover header

Harman, as the primary writer for the paper Lucifer, the Light-Bearer, extensively expressed his political opinions, with a primary focus on advocating for women's rights. He strongly criticized marriage, viewing it as a system that subjugated women to men and the state. His writings in Lucifer, the Light-Bearer sparked discussions and debates about gender equality and challenged societal norms of his time. The paper was home to many letters, petitions and articles that discussed societal and political changes for women in America. One such contribution was from Lois Waisbrooker and was a declaration of independence for women that prescribed societal expectations and rule upon men and women.

Whereas:-Man, as a sex, has no more right to make laws and insist upon our obedience than we, as a sex, have to make laws and insist upon his obedience, and

Whereas:-The race lives upon the heart's blood of woman daring its prenatal existence, thus making the character of its individual members largely dependent upon conditions surrounding her, and

Whereas:-Woman herself can best understand the conditions needed for her work as mother of the race, and

Whereas:-The present institutions of society are not adapted to woman's freedom,

Therefore we the undersigned, hereby repudiate man's role over as, demanding the right to ourselves and such a re-adjustment of conditions as will enable us to do our Best Work for the human race.

Contributions such as this were representative of the level of political change that Harman advocated for. The church was another area of society that Harman targeted in Lucifer through his support of other likeminded activists such as the writer and activist Matilda Joslyn Gage. Gage argued that the church's influence over the state had created the societal chains upon women that bound them to an unjust system, and the acts of the church to care for abandoned children only was necessary because of the societal pressures that church imposed on women and through them their children.
