= Gerald Bullett =

British writer (1893–1958)

- Bullett in 1926
- Born: 30 December 1893; London, England
- Died: 3 January 1958 (aged 64); Chichester, England
- Education: Jesus College, Cambridge
- Writing career
- Pen name: Sebastian Fox

Gerald William Bullett (30 December 1893 – 3 January 1958) was a British man of letters. He was known as a novelist, essayist, short story writer, critic, poet and publisher. He wrote both supernatural fiction and some children's literature. A few of his books were published under the pseudonym Sebastian Fox.

== Biography ==
Bullett was born in London, the son of businessman Robert Bullet and Ellen Bullett (née Pegg), and educated at Jesus College, Cambridge. During the Second World War he worked for the BBC in London, and after the war was a radio broadcaster. Bullett also contributed to the Times Literary Supplement. Politically, Bullett described himself as a "liberal socialist" and claimed to detest "prudery, prohibition, blood sports, central heating, and literary tea parties". Bullett was also an anti-fascist, describing fascism as "gangsterism on a national scale"; he publicly backed the Republican side during the Spanish Civil War.

One of his novels was Mr. Godly Beside Himself (1924), a humorous fantasy story about a modern man who exchanges places with his doppelgänger in fairyland. Brian Stableford likens Bullet's novel to other works of post First World War British fantasy, such as Stella Benson's Living Alone (1919), and Hope Mirrlees' Lud-in-the-Mist (1926).

Bullett was a great admirer of Walt Whitman, and wrote an essay on Whitman for the book Great Democrats by Alfred Barratt Brown. Here he described Whitman as "a man full-blooded and brotherly, unselfconscious in his democracy and genuinely at ease with all kinds and classes".

In 1926 Bullett established the publishing firm Gerald Howe Ltd. in partnership with Garfield Howe. The firm "issued a modest list of titles with a literary bent".

Bullett died in Chichester, West Sussex, on 3 January 1958.

== Works ==
- The Progress of Kay, A Series of Glimpses (1916)
- Mice and other poems (1921)
- The Street of the Eye and Nine Other Tales (1923)
- Mr Godly Beside Himself (1924)
- Walt Whitman: A Study and a Selection (1924)
- The Baker's Cart and Other Tales (1925)
- Modern English Fiction (1926)
- Seed of Israel: Tales from the English Bible (1927)
- The Spanish Caravel (1927); later The Happy Mariners (1956)
- "Dreaming" (1928) – essay
- The World in Bud and Other Tales (1928)
- Nicky Son of Egg (1929)
- The History of Egg Pandervil (1929)
- Germany (1930)
- Remember Mrs Munch (1931)
- Marden Fee (1931)
- Helen's Lovers and Other Tales (1932)
- I'll Tell You Everything (1932), by Bullett and J. B. Priestley
- The Quick and The Dead (1933)
- Eden River (1934)
- The Bubble (1934)
- The Jury (1935) – filmed as The Last Man to Hang? in 1956
- The Snare of the Fowler: A Tragedy of Time & Chance (1936), as by Sebastian Fox
- Poems in Pencil (1937)
- The Innocence of G. K. Chesterton (1937)
- The Bending Sickle (1938) – novel
- Twenty Four Tales (1938)
- When the Cat's Away (1940)
- A Man of Forty (1940)
- Winter Solstice (1943)
- The Elderbrook Brothers (1945)
- Judgment in Suspense (1946) – novel
- George Eliot (1947)
- Men at High Table and The House of Strangers (1948)
- Poems (1949)
- Cricket in Heaven (1949)
- The English Mystics (1950)
- Sydney Smith, a Biography and a Selection (1951)
- The Trouble at Number Seven (1952)
- News From The Village (1952) – poems
- The Alderman's Son (1954) – novel
- Windows On A Vanished Time (1955)
- One Man's Poison (1956), as by Sebastian Fox
- The Daughters of Mrs Peacock (1957)
- Odd Woman Out (1958), as by Sebastian Fox
- The Peacock Brides (1958)
- Ten-Minute Tales and Some Others (1959)
- Collected Poems (1959), selected by E. M. W. Tillyard

=== As editor ===
- The English Galaxy of Shorter Poems (1923)
- Short Stories of To-day and Yesterday (1929)
- The Testament of Light (1932) – anthology
- The Pattern of Courtesy: An Anthology, Continuing the Testament of Light (1934)
- A Book of Good Faith – Montaigne: A Miscellany of Passages (1938)
- The Phœnix and Turtle (1938)
- The Jackdaw's Nest, A Fivefold Anthology (1939)
- Readings in English Literature: From Chaucer to Matthew Arnold (1945)
- Silver Poets of the 16th Century (1947)

=== As translator ===
- The Golden Year of Fan Cheng-Ta: A Chinese Rural Sequence Rendered into English Verse (1946)
