= James Gregory (historian) =

British historian and academic

James Gregory FRHistS
- Born: James Richard Thomas Elliott Gregory
- Occupations: Historian; academic

Academic background
- Education: University of Oxford (BA, 1996); University of Cambridge (MPhil, 1997); University of Southampton (PhD, 2002)
- Thesis: The Vegetarian Movement in Britain c.1840–1901: A Study of Its Development, Personnel and Wider Connections (2002)

Academic work
- Discipline: History
- Sub-discipline: Modern British history; Victorian history; cultural history; social history; print culture
- Institutions: University of Plymouth; University of Bradford
- Notable works: Of Victorians and Vegetarians (2007)

James Richard Thomas Elliott Gregory FRHistS is a British historian and academic. He is Associate Professor of Modern British History at the University of Plymouth, where he leads the MA History programme. His work covers Victorian history, cultural history, social history, and print culture, with research interests including nineteenth-century British reform movements, popular entertainment, political discourse, the history of publishing, and Franco-British cultural relations.

Gregory is the author of Of Victorians and Vegetarians (2007), a study of vegetarianism in the Victorian era based on his doctoral research. He has also written on mercy, satire, political change, decolonisation, Napoleon in British culture, and cultural responses to war, particularly in Britain from the eighteenth to the twentieth century. He was previously a lecturer in Modern British history at the University of Bradford.

== Education ==
Gregory studied modern history at the University of Oxford, graduating with a BA in 1996. He earned a MPhil in historical studies at the University of Cambridge in 1997. In 2002, he completed his PhD in history at the University of Southampton. His thesis was titled The Vegetarian Movement in Britain c.1840–1901: A Study of Its Development, Personnel and Wider Connections and was supervised by John Rule; it also included an accompanying biographical index of around 1,470 vegetarians active from c. 1837 – c. 1901.

== Career ==
Gregory was previously employed at the University of Bradford as a lecturer in Modern British History. He is Associate Professor of Modern British History and programme leader for MA History at the University of Plymouth. He is also a fellow of the Royal Historical Society.

Gregory's research covers reform movements, popular entertainment, political discourse, eccentricity, and biography, as well as print culture, the history of publishing, and the cultural history of mercy, satire, and political change across the long nineteenth century. He has also written on vegetarianism in the Victorian era, the representation of Napoleon in British culture, Franco-British cultural relations, decolonisation, and cultural responses to war from the eighteenth to the twentieth century.

== Publications ==
- Napoleon in British Culture (2025)
- Mercy and British Culture, 1760–1960 (2021)
- The Royal Throne of Mercy and British Culture in the Victorian Age (2020)
- Libraries, Books and Collectors of Texts, 1600–1900 (as editor, with Annika Bautz; 2018)
- The Poetry and the Politics: Radical Reform in Victorian England (2014)
- Victorians Against the Gallows (2011)
- Reformers, Patrons and Philanthropists: The Cowper-Temples and High Politics in Victorian Britain (2010)
- Of Victorians and Vegetarians: The Vegetarian Movement in Nineteenth-century Britain (2007)
