= Joseph Hiam Levy =

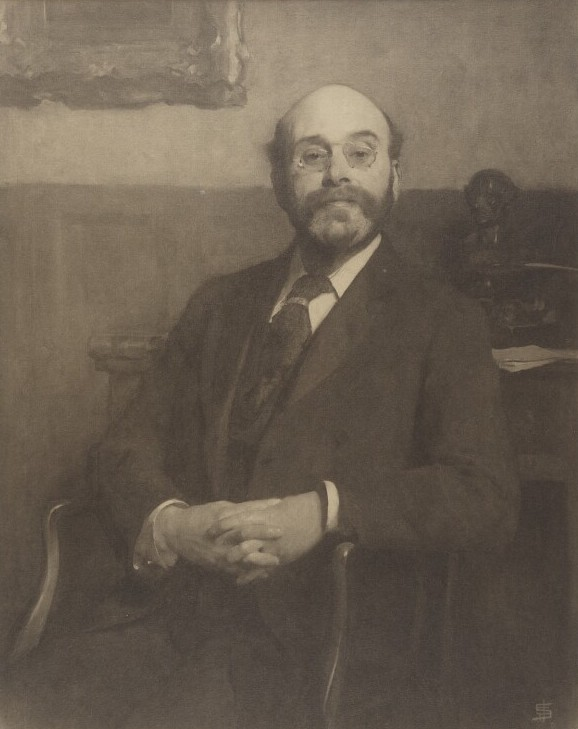
Photograph of portrait by Solomon Joseph Solomon

Joseph Hiam Levy (1838 – 1913) was an English author and economist. He was educated at the City of London School and joined the Civil Service. He was a member of the London Dialectical Society in the session 1867/8 and gave his address as: "J. H. Levy, Esq., Education Department, Privy Council Office, Downing St, S.W." He later became a lecturer in economics at Birkbeck College and an important figure in the Personal Rights Association.

Levy also wrote an introduction to the English translation of Yves Guyot's 1893 work, The Tyranny of Socialism.

Levy was an anti-vaccinationist as he believed it violated personal rights. He described compulsory vaccination as a "gross and cruel invasion of personal liberty". Levy's anti-vaccination book, The Bird that Laid the Vaccination Egg, published in 1892 was heavily criticized in medical journals as non-scientific.

== Publications ==
- A Symposium on Value. Edited by J. H. Levy, and consisting of papers by E. B. Bax, W. Donisthorpe 1895
- The Bird that Laid the Vaccination Egg: An Excursus on Scientific Authority. 1892
- State Vaccination: With Special Reference to Some Principles of Ancient Judaism. 1897
- Book-Plate and Verses. (The Lighthouse. Reprinted from the “Westminster Review.”). 1910
- The Economics of Labour Remuneration. A lecture.
- The Enfranchisement of Women: A Speech, etc. 1892
- The Fall of Man. (Verses with notes. Reprinted from the Westminster Review 1899)
- The Fiscal Question in Great Britain. Introduced by J. H. Levy. 1904
- Freedom the Fundamental Condition of Morality. A paper read at the Conference of the British, Con 1896
- The God of Israel. A paper read before the International Positivist Congress at Naples, 27 April 1908
- Individualism and the Land Question: A Discussion. 1912
- The Psychology of Pasteurism. A paper planned to be read at Cambridge at the end of 1913 but not delivered due to the author's death.
