= Studies in the Psychology of Sex Vol. 7 =

1928 book by Havelock Ellis

Studies in the Psychology of Sex: Volume 7
- Author: Havelock Ellis
- Language: English
- Publication date: 1928

Studies in the Psychology of Sex: Volume 7 is a book published in 1928 by the English physician and writer Havelock Ellis (1859–1939). Ellis was an expert of human sexuality but was impotent until the age of 60 and married to an open lesbian for much of his life. He later discovered that he could be aroused by the sight of a woman urinating. Terming this sexual deviation undinism, it is one of several topics covered in the seventh and final volume of his studies in the psychology of sex.

Ellis began writing the first of the seven books in 1892, exploring topics such as sexual inversion (homosexuality), sexuality in women, and erotic symbolism throughout the volumes. Volume seven was originally published in the United States due to the stigma surrounding transgenderism, homosexuality, and other sexual deviations in England at the time. The book contains 9 chapters, each exploring a sexual deviation or potential influences. It is largely composed of case studies and directly quotes the individuals he examined, providing the raw descriptions and perspectives of the individuals, rather than his own version of their deviations.

== Historical context ==
In the 1700s, Molly houses began appearing all over the UK – houses where homosexual men could meet. A "molly" was a man who frequently cross-dressed, and hence can be considered an early representative of transgender individuals. Despite these houses being relatively common, they were not accepted by the general public as homosexuality had been illegal in the UK since the Buggery Act 1533. Many of the laws and regulations pertaining to sexual deviations in England in the early 1900s were focused on homosexuality among men, viewing it as a mental illness that should be cured. In 1885, the Criminal Law Act was passed in the UK, prohibiting homosexuality. Due to the fact that many associated transgenderism (termed eonism by Ellis) with homosexuality, it was also highly ostracised and not well understood. Although no laws directly prohibited men dressing as women, it was not an accepted practice, and was viewed as a mental illness that had to be cured. Ellis attempted to normalise these sexual practices, along with others, highlighting that many individuals with these abnormal sexual inclinations were in fact functioning and contributing members of society.

== Content ==
Chapter 1, Eonism: the book begins with an introduction to eonism, Ellis' equivalent of what is now known as transgenderism. He emphasizes the fact that eonism and sexual inversion (homosexuality) were two completely separate sexual abnormalities that tended not to overlap. This was supported by the fact that all the introduced case studies were nonhomosexual men.

Chapter 2, The Doctrine of Erogenous Zones: this chapter delves into the basis of various perversions and sexual practices, naming the erogenic zones as a potential contributor. Ellis however states that these zones are also the basis of normal sexual processes, and that sexual perversions are simply more exaggerated versions of these ordinary practices.

Chapter 3, The History of Florrie and the Mechanism of Sexual Deviation: here Ellis focuses on the mechanisms of sexual deviation and the specific case study of Florrie, a young woman whom Ellis helped to entertain her sexual fantasies in order to achieve orgasm.

Chapter 4, The Menstrual Curve of Sexual Impulse: this chapter is dedicated to the study of female sexuality; more specifically the influence of the menstrual cycle on sexual impulse. Ellis believed that there were three curves of menstruation, and that when these all peaked simultaneously, women would be overcome with a wave of sexual desire.

Chapter 5, The Synthesis of Dreams: A Study of a Series of One Hundred Dreams: Ellis describes his method of "dream synthesis", a method of studying dreams inspired by his fellow academic Sigmund Freud. This method was intended to uncover sexual fantasies and their origin, but Ellis acknowledged the fact that improvements had to be made.

Chapter 6, The Conception of Narcissism: this chapter relates narcissism to sexuality, exploring how it can result in sexual deviations and its role in psychoanalysis. Here Ellis again refers to Freud's work.

Chapter 7, Undinism: this chapter is dedicated to undinism, a sexual perversion that Ellis himself experienced in which one gets aroused by the sight of a woman urinating. Ellis believed that it was a combination of heredity and infantile convulsions that produced the predisposition of developing this perversion.

Chapter 8, Kleptolagnia: this chapter is again dedicated to a fairly unfamiliar perversion called kleptolagnia: the state of being sexually aroused by theft. Ellis suggested that the development of this sexual deviation can primarily be traced back to childhood, where small stolen items acted as symbols for the individuals secret sexual desires.

Chapter 9, The History of Marriage: the final chapter of the book, recounts the history of marriage and its role In a wide variety of sexual perversions.

== Reception and influence ==
All seven volumes of Studies in the Psychology of Sex were widely accepted in the scientific community, even with the progressive perspectives in which it portrayed human sexuality and perversions. Despite this, the book was not published in England until the middle of the 20th century, as it was strongly believed that putting Ellis' ideas into the public would increase the rates of individuals with sexual perversions. For a long time, concepts like eonism and undinism were assumed to be effects of other psychological disorders such a schizophrenia. Ellis' innovative take on these perversions and their origins attempted to normalise them and demonstrate that these individuals can be functioning members of society.

A few years prior to Ellis' publication of the first volume in his series, Krafft-Ebbing, an Austrian professor of psychiatry, also took an interest in the sexual impulses of transgender individuals. After the publications of both Krafft-Ebbing's and Ellis' studies, other sexologists and psychologists began to show interest in these studies as well. Magnus Hirschfeld, a German sexologist, began to similarly explore the sexual impulses and behaviours of transgender individuals, and eventually gender reassignment surgery. With the help of medical professionals, the first full gender reassignment surgery was completed in Hirschfeld's clinic in 1931 on Lili Elbe.

Although Ellis' book was not published everywhere until years after its initial release in the United States, it opened the door to a more accepting view on transgenderism and other sexual perversions, and for the first time disconnected these concepts from mental illness.

== See also ==
- Studies in the Psychology of Sex Vol. 2
