= The Criminal (Havelock Ellis) =

1890 book by Havelock Ellis

The criminal
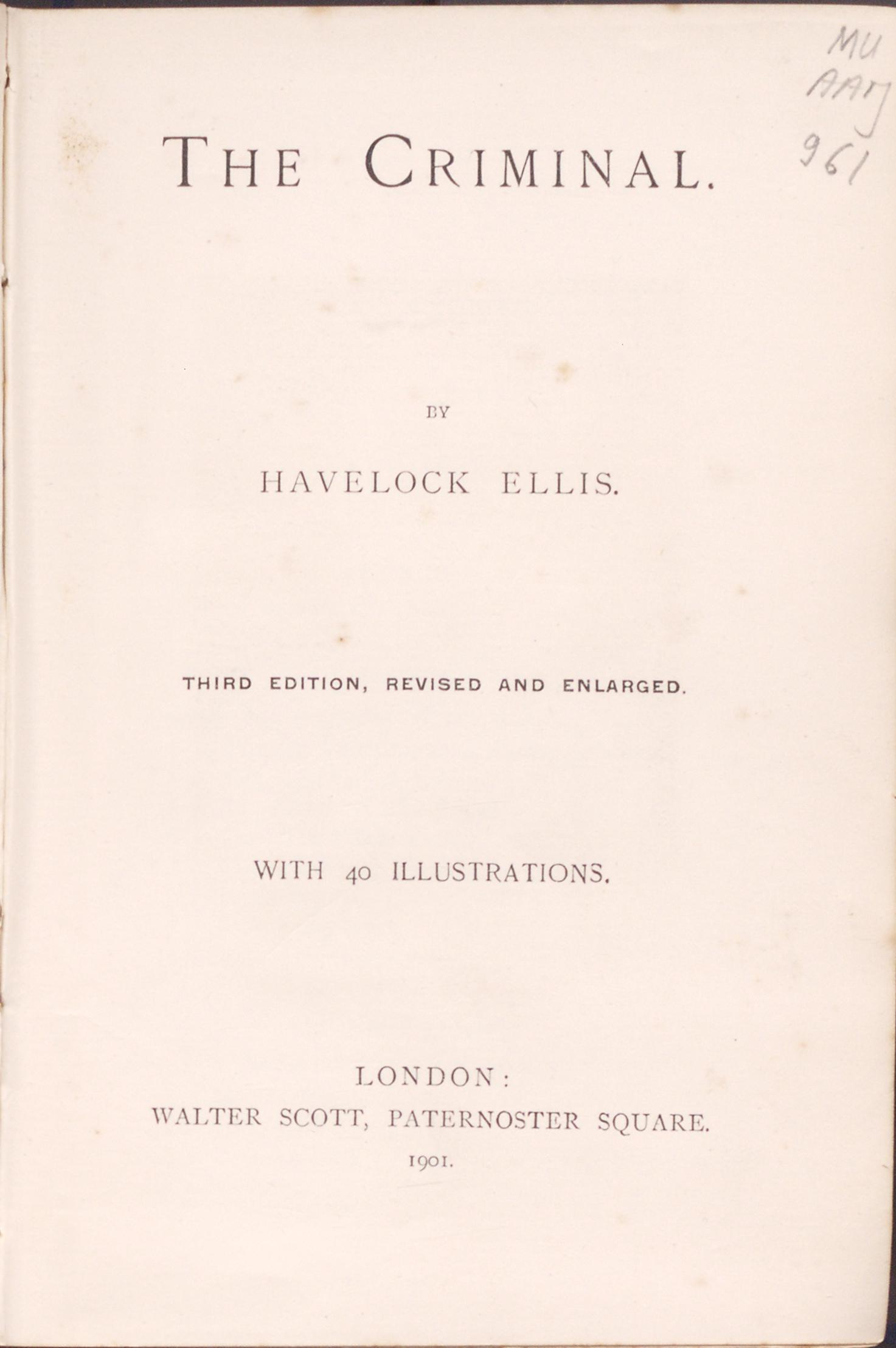
- Author: Havelock Ellis
- Language: English
- Series: The contemporary science series
- Genre: Criminal anthropology
- Published: 1890
- Publisher: Walter Scott Publishing Co., LTD.
- Media type: Print
- Pages: 419

The Criminal is a book by Havelock Ellis published in 1890. A third revised and enlarged edition was subsequently published in 1901. The book is a comprehensive English summary of the main results of criminal anthropology, a field of study which was scarcely known at the time of the publication of the volume. The criminal is the first book published by the author and helped establish his reputation in the scientific world.

== Context ==
Italian Cesare Lombroso is recognised worldwide as the founding father of criminal anthropology since he was the first to perceive the study of crime as a self-standing scientific field. Lombroso is credited to be the first to regard criminality as a physical anomaly that can be measured and weighted. Lombroso founded his own school of thought on criminal anthropology, which attracted support from fellow scientists across Europe. Ellis highly regarded the Italian criminal anthropologist and considered that Lombroso's book, L'uomo delinquente, should have been considered as influential as On the Origin of Species. Havelock Ellis was one of Lombroso's followers and one of the few postulating the theory of the inborn criminal in the United Kingdom. The criminal was the only British book published between 1880 and 1918 based solely on Cesare Lombroso's theories on criminal anthropology.

Studies on criminals or criminality in general had been conducted in England prior to the publication of The criminal. These studies were conducted independently of the field of criminal anthropology, which was scarcely known in the second half of the nineteenth century. Regardless of the lack of enthusiasm in the British scientific community, Ellis found the topic relevant and important for society. When researching for his book, Ellis was disappointed that his peers did not share his enthusiasm and had little or no knowledge at all about criminal anthropology. He decided that The criminal could be a valuable contribution to the scarce British literature on criminal anthropology.

Ellis mentions Franz Joseph Gall as one of the founders of ''modern science of criminal anthropology''. Gall was convinced that intellectual capacities are influenced by the volume and the shape of the brain. The physical characteristics of the brain dictate the shape of the skull. The new study field established by Gall is known as phrenology. Gall applied his phrenological knowledge to criminal anthropology and concluded that physical characteristics of the skulls could predict criminal tendencies. His beliefs prove that, similar to Havelock Ellis, Gall was a follower of Cesare Lombroso.

The measure of culpability, and the measure of punishment cannot be determined by a study of the illegal act, but only by a study of the individual committing it.

— Franz Joseph Gall, Les Fonctions du Cerveau (1822)

Between 1886 and 1914, The Archives d’Anthropologie Criminelle, founded by doctor Alexandre Lacassagne, was published. It was the first French-language academic journal dedicated to the topic of criminology. It published theoretical and practical work regarding criminal anthropology and forensic medicine. Divided into four parts, The Archives are a comprehensive work. The last part of the journal addresses criminal anthropology studies from three different countries. The works of scientists from Italy, Spain, and Great Britain are contrasted with the French ones. The volume of literature on criminal anthropology from European countries, such as Portugal, Italy, Spain, France, Russia, is larger than the English one. Ellis ascribes it to criminal anthropology not being yet established, in the early 1880s, as an exact science.

== Contents ==
=== Table of contents ===
- Chapter I. Introduction
- Chapter II. The study of the criminal
- Chapter III. Criminal anthropology (physical)
  - 1. Cranial and Cerebral characteristics
  - 2. The face
  - 3. Anomalies of the hair
  - 4. Criminal physiognomy
  - 5. The body and the viscera
  - 6. Heredity
  - 7. Motor activity
  - 8. Physical sensibility
- Chapter IV. Criminal anthropology (physical)-continued
  - 1. Moral insensibility
  - 2. Dreaming in criminals
  - 3. Intelligence
  - 4. Vanity
  - 5. Emotional instability
  - 6. Sentiment
  - 7. Religion
  - 8. Tattooing
  - 9. Thieves' slang
  - 10. Prison inscriptions
  - 11. Criminal literature and art
  - 12. Criminal philosophy
- Chapter V. The results of criminal anthropology
- Chapter VI. The treatment of criminals
- Chapter VII. Conclusions
- Appendix
  - A. Explanation of plates
  - B. Criminality in children
  - C. Elmira
  - D. The investigation of criminals
- Index of authors
- Index of subjects

=== Book summary ===
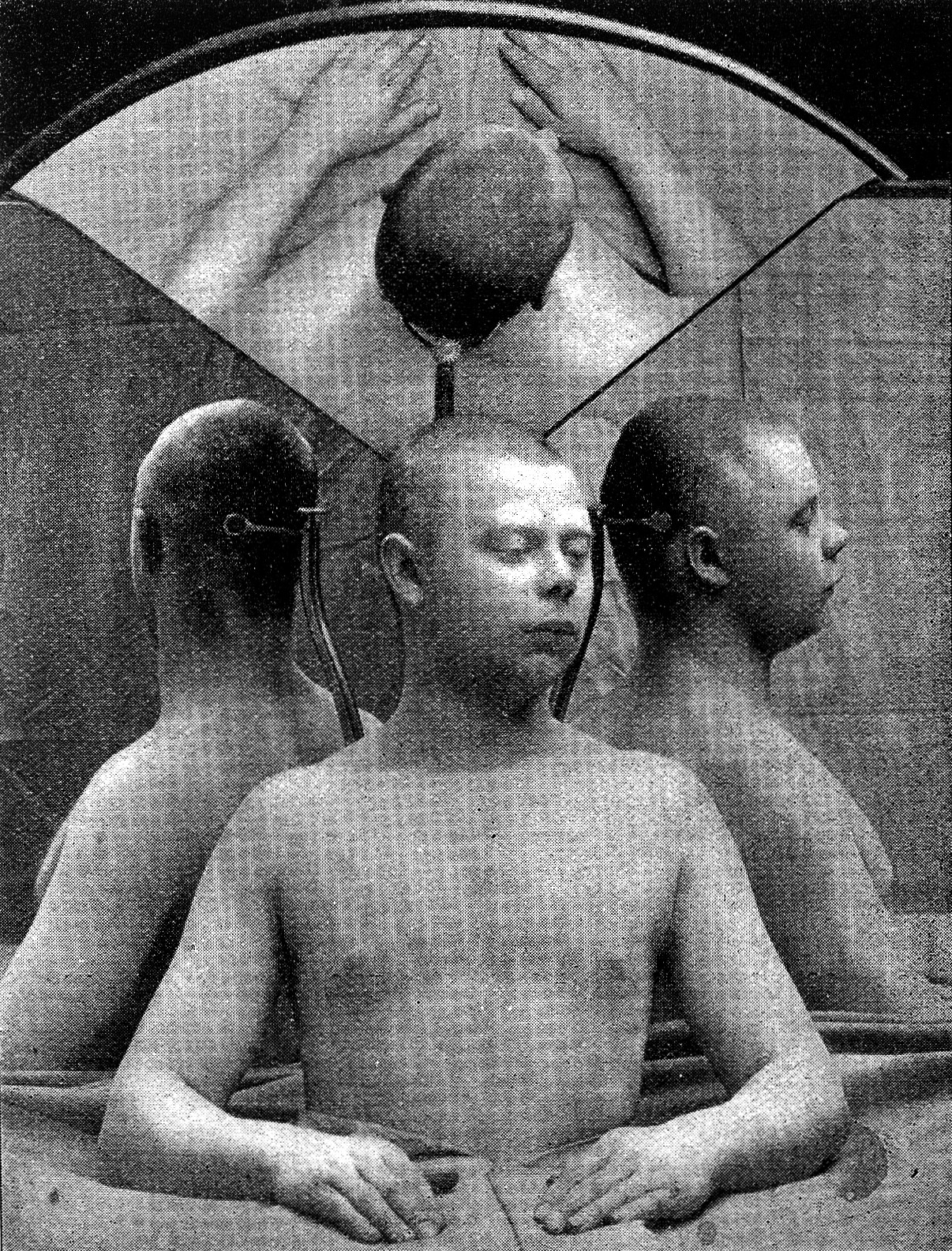

The criminal consists of seven chapters preceded by a preface written by Ellis. An appendix with forty illustrations is provided at the end of the volume. The appendix is divided into four parts. Appendix A provides detailed explanations for all the plates. Appendix B summarises the study of criminality in children. A picture of the life and treatment applied to prisoners in Elmira Reformatory is depicted in part C. Criteria for the physical medical investigation of criminals and their descriptions are outlined in appendix D.

The preface lays out how the book came in to existence and what is its purpose. The author explains that he felt the need to fill in a knowledge gap in his contemporary scientific knowledge regarding criminal behaviour and punishment. Ellis outlines in the preface what are the questions that his book aims to address. They refer to the nature and the motives of criminals and the required methods of punishment to be employed. Ellis shares Lombroso's theory of the born criminal whose hereditary physical characteristics illustrate their criminal tendencies.

What is a criminal? Is he [...] a normal person who has willingly committed an abnormal act? Is he the victim of acquired disease, such ad some form of epilepsy? Is he an atavistic reappearance of the savage in modern society? Is he a degenerate? What is the criminal type?

— Havelock Ellis, preface of the book

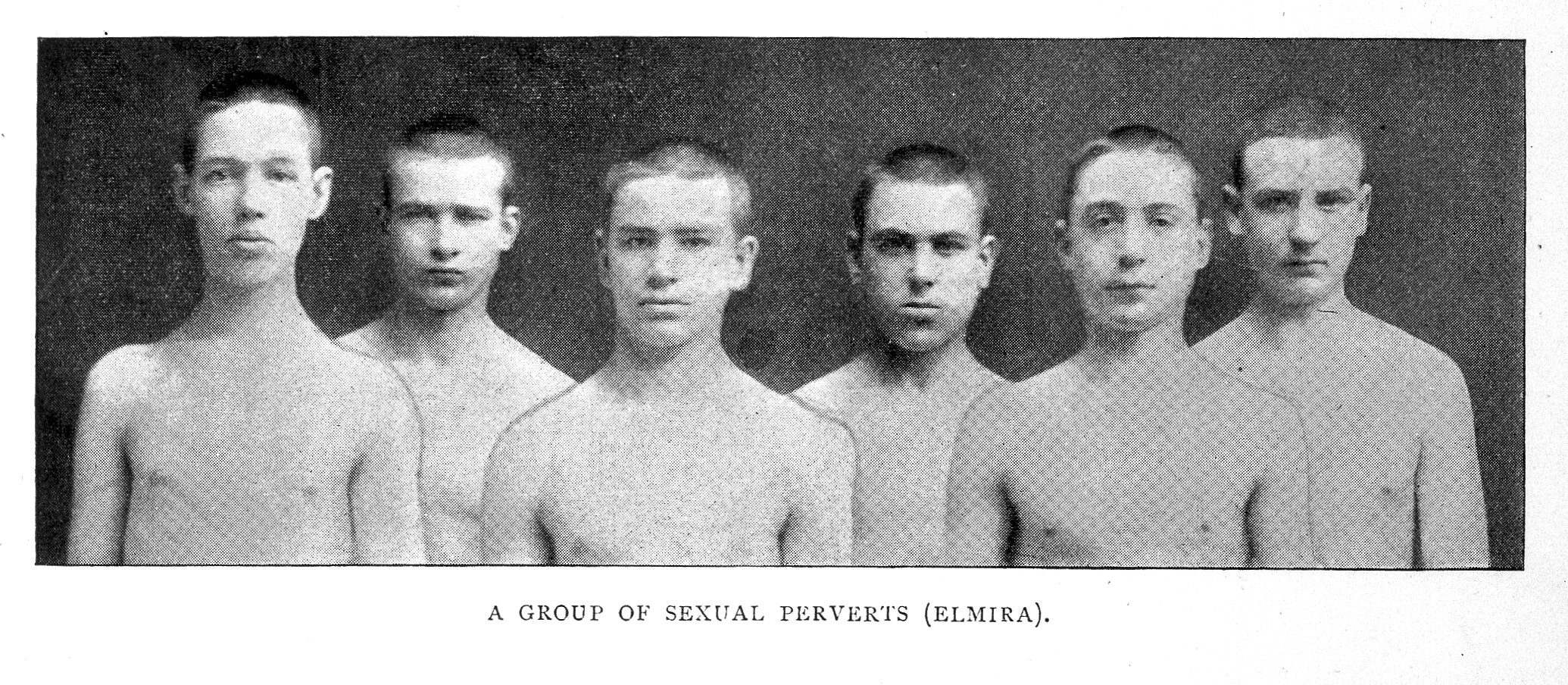

Ellis mentions his personal hypothesis regarding the nature of criminals. His opinion is biased and influenced his approach of the topic.

The criminal is a congenitally weak-minded person whose abnormality, while by no means leaving the mental aptitudes absolutely unimpaired, chiefly affects the feelings and volition, so influencing conduct and rendering him an anti-social element in society. [...] The criminal is certainly not insane, but neither is he normal, and while not wholly insensitive to the motives which influence the normal man, he is not affected by them in the same way or in the same degree as the normal man.

— Havelock Ellis

The introduction presents an overview of the existent chief varieties of criminals and makes reference to at least one case study for each category. Ellis mentions six different types of criminals: political, by passion, insane, instinctive, occasional, and habitual. Causes of crime are cosmic, biological, or societal. Ellis refers to the influences of diet, individual temperament, and the interactions with the external world. The author states that the criminal is a product of various influences, both internal (hereditary) and external. The second chapter summarises previously conducted anthropological studies on criminals all over the world. The cited literature belongs to Cesare Lombroso, Enrico Ferri, Antonio Marro, von Baer, Schwalbe, Rafael Salillas, Arthure McDonald, Eugene Talbot, and Douglas Morrison. The main part of the book is constituted by the third and fourth chapter. They give a detailed description of the physical, moral, social, emotional, and religious aspects of criminals and their lives. The criminal discusses various topics related to criminality. These are the peculiar criminal slang, the inmates' literary productions and views on religion, prison inscriptions, and criminality viewed from the perspective of the prisoners. The fifth book chapter aims to answer the questions Ellis formulated in the preface. This chapters is an overview of the author's perspective on the nature of criminals. All the anthropological evidence discussed throughout the volume are summarised and linked together.

The sixth chapter suggests possible methods of dealing with and punishing criminality. They are all based on the findings listed by Ellis. This book part opens by stating that no one can be classified as truly normal. The author refers to the Christian belief to support his claim that no society member is entitled to judge their peer. Since the idea of punishment for one's crime lays on the beliefs that one is normal and that a criminal act is a voluntary deviation, Ellis strongly opposes the reformatory system of his time. He condemns the capital punishment. At the end of the nineteenth century, the capital punishment was already abolished in Italy, Switzerland, The Netherlands, Portugal, and some states in the U.S. In keeping with his affiliation with the Eugenics Society, Ellis refers to Seneca's and Galen's advocacy for "putting instinctive criminals to death" so as to ensure "the destruction of offenders against social life, regarding them as diseased members to be removed for the advantage of the whole social body". Ellis presents a brief historical overview of prisons worldwide. He concludes that prisons have definitely undergone reforms when it comes to their cleanliness, ingenuity, and routine standards. Reform has happened for the physical establishment but has not occurred in prisoners or their behaviour. Based on European prison reports and interviews with prison doctors and administrators, Ellis concludes that the prison system failed its purpose. Instead of being reformed, criminals are hardened, depressed, corrupted, or turned into brutes who will once again be sentenced to prison once released. Ellis proposes several reforms for the prison system, most of which are based on the treatment applied at Elmira Reformatory. He suggests the abolition of the definite and predetermined sentence, reorganisation of prison staff so that they are trained and qualified in caring for the criminals, and regulation of voluntary visitation. Criminal education should involve constant mental or physical activity with the aim that prisoners have no leisure time for reviving their criminal past or planning for the future. Criminals should be involved in industry (e.g. farming, fruit growing, carpentry, shoe-making, painting, tailoring, baking, laundering, housework, music, telegraphing). In this way they actively contribute to the society they will be released in. A prison should not only be a care and treatment facility, but also one for the advancement of knowledge in the field of criminology. Within the prison, the study of criminal anthropology should be able to expand its existent range of knowledge.

Towards the end of chapter six, Ellis refers back to Lombroso's definition of the criminal, which is "an inborn defect, idiotic, imbecile, and weak-minded class". In these cases, the example of the Bicêtre Institution should be followed. At Bicêtre, members of the congenitally anti-social class were recognised and trained at an early age so as to avert them from the path of criminality. Ellis supports interventions in the youth because it is a time when criminal behaviour has not been displayed yet. He believes that imprisonment should be avoided at all costs. In the case of petty crimes or young offenders, Ellis encourages the use of fines and communal work as a form of punishment.

Chapter seven is the conclusive one. Ellis reiterates why criminal anthropology is relevant and how it can impact society. Criminality is described as natural phenomena that has always mesmerised the masses, especially the less educated classes. While intellectuals were lured by men of genius, the uneducated were drawn to the almost heroic images of criminals. In some cases, criminals were the object of fierce passions or obsessions. One question addressed by Ellis is the one posed by insanity and whether or not it can be used as a viable defense during a trial. The author argues against acquitting a criminal on bases of insanity. Ellis views insanity as a loss of self-control that can fully be ascribed to the individual. Ellis uses the example of vices to support his claim. The insane criminal described by the author holds the same amount of individual moral responsibility as any other criminal. Ellis states that society has the duty both to protect itself against (insane) criminals and to treat them as humanely as possible so as to render them capable of living a social life. Should society carry out this duty, regardless of its definition, insanity makes no practical difference to society nor the criminal. Ellis analyses the relationship between (personal) responsibility and crime by quoting the works of Augustin Hamon. Hamon asserts that "responsibility is not a state of consciousness" because "responsibility is a social relationship without real existence". For Hamon, "the only real responsibility is social responsibility [...] Man is responsible because he lives in society, and only because of that social existence". Considering this philosophical standing point, Ellis then concludes that everyone, including the insane and the socially abnormal are, socially, necessarily responsible. The criminal's author defines responsibility as men having to suffer the consequences of their action. When dealing with criminality, Ellis concludes that the actions against anti-social behaviour need to be designed to compel the criminal into being less anti-social and more integrated into their community. Education used to be employed for this endeavour, but it proved not efficient enough, according to the reports referred to by the author. In the final paragraph of his book, Ellis concludes that the worldwide rising criminality rates attests criminality is not an isolated issue that needs to be addressed in the complex context in which it arises.

The quintessence of The criminal could be summarised by the following quote extracted from chapter six:

The immense practical importance of criminal anthropology lies in this: that it enables us to discriminate between criminal and criminal, and to apply to each individual case its appropriate treatment.

— Havelock Ellis, The criminal, p.321

== Reception ==
The structure and writing style of the book were praised as being clear, concise, and comprehensive, all being valuable characteristics of a work that aims to act as a literature review.

The criminal is considered an important addition to the literature on criminal anthropology, especially at the time of its publication. English studies on the topic were scarce at the end of the nineteenth century and Ellis' book allowed the English public to have access to a summary of findings on criminal anthropology. Arthur MacDonald states that Ellis challenges the nineteenth century view of criminality by proving that it is an intrinsic part of society and it has to be treated as such. MacDonald believes that The criminal is a valuable work because it shows the British society the complex nature of prisoners.

The author admits that his book contains no novel or original information. A.G. Warner praises the importance of The criminal. Ellis does not only resume criminal anthropological evidence from Italy, Germany, France, United Kingdom, and United States, but also includes a part on the treatment of criminals. Ellis proposes a reform of prisoners, opposite to a reform of prisons, which is what authorities solely have focused on up to the end of 1890s. The criminal presents itself as a practical guide for changing the prison and sentencing systems and gives the example of the Elmira Reformatory to support its claims. Ellis argues that sentences are usually given for the crimes and not for the criminals. The punishment assigned by the judiciary system is unsuited and ineffective. The author argues that each criminal class should receive different sentences that match the motives behind the criminal act.

The scientific knowledge on criminality was limited at time when Ellis published his book. Because of that, A.G. Warner, in his review of the book, hopes that Ellis' volume would catch the interest of others undergoing studies in social sciences. Warner dreams that the field of criminal anthropology would be greatly enriched by students eager to fill in its knowledge gaps.

British criminologist or workers in the prison system have, since the beginning of the 1890s, unanimously adopted a position that opposed the theories favoured by various existent schools of thought. They valued hands-on experience gathered by interaction with the prisoners. This approach contrasts with the theoretical one adopted by Lombroso. Because of the clash in the British scientific community, criminal anthropology was not perceived as a real science. Why Ellis' book was not met with great success among the British criminologists could be ascribed to the wide disregard his peers displayed towards Ellis. In his Memoirs published in 1894, prison inspector Arthur Griffiths concludes:

The world will probably remain very much where it was before the evolution of the criminal type. The fact is interesting, but it cannot be imported into criminal methods with either fairness or safety.… Criminal anthropology rests at present on too insecure grounds, on too many suppositions and probabilities to be entitled to the name of a science. It has been deduced from too incomplete premises, too hasty inquiries to give substantial results.

— Arthur Griffiths, Memoirs

In the years prior to the First World War, British scientist continued to show their scepticism regarding criminal anthropology. Doctor James Devon, medical officer at Glasgow Prison, highlights the complex nature of crime, which goes beyond physical characteristics or inherited tendencies. Devon classifies criminal anthropology as a field "for the little qualified or competent" to deal with the real study of criminality. Both Ellis and Francis Galton, which were supporters of criminal anthropology, were accused of blindly accepting of Lombroso's theory without critically interpreting it.

Ellis' works that followed The criminal do not focus on criminal anthropology anymore. They are all related to the study of sexuality. The author dedicates the rest of his academic career to topics such as eroticism or psychology of sex. Ellis remains active in the field of criminology by peer-reviewing works of his fellow scholars. In 1900, Ellis publishes his thoughts on August Drähms' book, The Criminal: His Personnel and Environment. A Scientific Study.
