= Studies in the Psychology of Sex Vol. 2 =

1900 book by Havelock Ellis

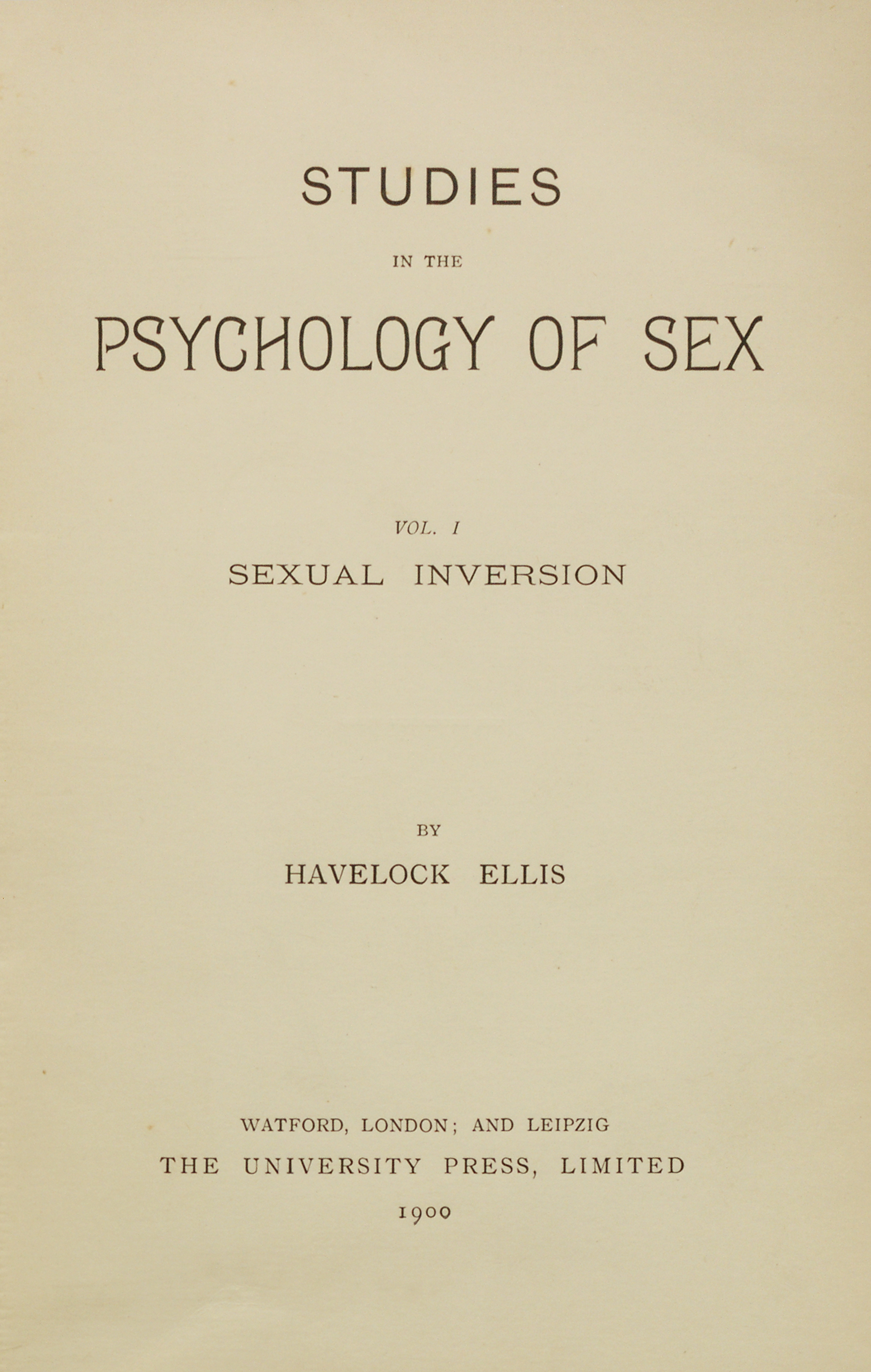
- Title page of the book
- Author: Havelock Ellis
- Subject: Sexuality, Psychology, Sexual Inversion
- Genre: Textbook
- Publisher: The University Press, Limited
- Publication date: 1900
- Publication place: United States
- Media type: Print
- Pages: 204

Studies in the Psychology of Sex Vol. 2 is a book published in 1900 written by Havelock Ellis (1859–1939), an English physician, writer and social reformer. The book deals with the phenomenon of sexual inversion, an outdated term for homosexuality, as well as heterosexual trans people. It is part of Ellis' seven-volume series Studies in the psychology of sex. The book has seven chapters describing the prevalence, nature and theories in the 19th century about sexual inversion in men and women. Various case studies are presented and discussed. Ellis recognised a need to address the topic of sexual inversion especially in England:

... in England, more than in any other country, the law and public opinion combine to place a heavy penal burden and a severe social stigma on the manifestations of an instinct which to these persons who possess it frequently appears natural and normal.

— Havelock Ellis,

However, the publication of the book was suppressed in England at first and it was published in the United States instead.

== Historical context ==
"Homosexual practices in private, between two consenting parties, are absolutely unpunished [...]" in France, Belgium, the Netherlands and other European countries. In the 18th century sex between men was a topic that was discussed publicly. Sodomy, any form of sexual activity that does not involve penile penetration of a vagina, was long criminalised. It was decriminalised in France during the French Revolution. Other countries also adopted this forcefully or by choice, including Austria, Russia and Brazil. In England, anal penetration of men and women as well as mutual masturbation for man was still sentenced even when it occurred privately, with consent and no involvement of minors. Ellis proposes making homosexual practices legal. He rejects the fear of the state that the legalisation of homosexuality will increase its prevalence. The book was the first major work on the topic in England and also breaks with previous works on homosexuality because it contains middle-class characters as protagonists and regards most cases of sexual inversion as congenital. This challenged the conception of the inverted identity as a bad character with a lack of self-control.

== Publication ==
For the book Ellis worked together with John Addington Symonds. Symonds was a secret homosexual who lived abroad. Their correspondence happened via letters and after Symonds' death, Ellis was not able to find a publisher for his book in England because they all feared prosecution. Therefore, his book Studies in the psychology of Sex Vol. 1 was first published in (Germany) as Das konträre Geschlechtsgefühl in 1896. Later, an American company published the book in English. However, the book was suppressed by many British authorities who made sure that copies would not be sold in Britain. A bookseller who sold copies of the book in Britain was charged and pleaded guilty. Symonds' family also wished to suppress the book to protect their reputation.

== Content ==
=== Introduction ===
The prevalence of homosexuality is investigated as well as several observations of homosexual costumes from different cultures. In the Montana Indian culture, for example, men that are attracted to other men are called boté. An observation by Dr. Holder describes these men as dressing and acting like women from childhood on, followed by sexual practices after puberty. Also, some men of great intellect, as the author describes it, like the Roman Emperor Caesar or the French Humanist Muretus are known to have had some homosexual tendencies. The author concludes that all these cases suggest a form of sexual inversion which is congenital but there is no evidence for it.

=== Chapter II, the study of sexual inversion ===
Chapter II deals with various scholars who had previously studied homosexuality. Among them is Karl Friedrich Otto Westphal a German psychiatrist from Berlin who proposed that sexual inversion is something innate and not acquired and is not necessarily a sign of insanity. Attempts to classify forms of sexual inversion are also discussed for example one proposal by Richard Krafft-Ebbing a psychiatrist and author of Psychopathia Sexualis.

=== Chapter III, sexual inversion in men ===
Chapter III describes how sexual inversion may manifest in men and presents various case studies. An undifferentiated sexual feeling toward men is considered normal until puberty. The cases are classified into the following: simple sexual inversion with or without intercourse, cases that practice masochism, prisoners and men integrated in society and psychosexual hermaphrodite. The cases are reported either by the men themselves or by doctors.

=== Chapter IV, sexual inversion in women ===
Ellis notes that homosexuality is as common in women as in men. However, it is little known about sexual inversion in women, which is also reflected in the presence of only four case studies in this chapter. The true sexual invert is described and an inverted woman is distinguished from an actively inverted woman who appears to be more masculine. A genuine criterion seems to be the indifference of inverted women toward men which is returned by them. Furthermore, the author suspects that the prevalence of homosexuality among women is increasing which he explains by emancipation and equal rights movements. In the last part the high prevalence of homosexuality among prostitutes is addressed.

=== Chapter V, the nature of sexual inversion ===
This chapter is an analysis and summary of the earlier case studies. Sexual inversion in the cases presented seems not to be heritable. Records of inversion or other abnormalities are not conspicuously frequent among the case studies. Most of the subjects have good general health. In most of the subjects the homosexual instinct appeared in early life without a previous affection for the opposite sex. Ellis associates precocious puberty with sexual inversion. Ellis excludes suggestion as a cause of sexual inversion. Also, masturbation in male cases is reported as predisposing to inversion whereas there was no such relationship observed for the female cases. Most of the subjects are adverse towards sexual relationships with the opposite sex. However, there are close and genuine friendships between sexual inverts and members of the opposite sex. Many subjects investigated by Ellis show artistic talent. Lastly, most of the subjects regard their sexual inversion as being equal to heterosexuality so they do not think that their sexual instinct is immoral.

=== Chapter VII, the theory of sexual inversion ===
Ellis attempts to define several terms and clarify the terminology around the topic of sexual inversion. The definition of sexual inversion itself is according to Ellis highly dependent on context. Ellis clarifies that although sexual inversion might be both acquired and congenital, it is primarily congenital. The normal sexual instinct is inborn and not acquired, and sexual inversion is a natural variety of sexual instinct. It is also compared to color-blindness and color hearing, all of these phenomena being classified as abnormalities. It is also stressed that abnormality need not imply morbidity or disease; it is a mere variation of the normal. Three types of inversion are distinguished: congenital predisposition to sexual inversion which remains latent, very strong predisposition and a weaker predisposition that can be excited by a powerful cause. Suggested causes include the co-education of boys and girls, the seduction by an older person and disappointment in normal love. However, Ellis also stresses that in most of the cases sexual inversion was present from childhood on and was more of the strong predisposed type.

=== Chapter VIII, conclusions ===
In the conclusion Ellis first examines the treatment of Dr. von Schrenck-Notzing who was a German physician, psychiatrist and notable psychical researcher in the field of paranormal events. The cure included 150 sessions of hypnosis for one year as well as frequent drunken visits of the brothel. Ellis qualifies this treatment as not successful and concludes: “[...] the remedy seems to me worse than the disease [...]." It seems to Ellis that it is not possible to "cure" the sexual invert but that there should be an effort made to help them being healthy, self-restrained and self-respecting to be functional members of society. The legal situation of homosexual practices is also described.

The book contains the following appendices:

- A Homosexuality among Tramps by Josiah Flynt
- B Ulrich’s View by "Z"
- D Countess Sarolta V
- E A note on sexual inversion by Dr. K

== Influence and reception ==
The studies in the psychology of sex vol.1 is an example of a more diverse view of sexuality from the Victorian era. Emma Mason asserts that:

[...] we might suggest that the Victorians were more tolerant than their 1960s counterparts of sex between males. But given the strict policing of knowledge and even the language used to discuss such intimate behaviours, we must ask – what did that tolerance really mean?

The book was not published in England because it was noted that homosexual practices increase in Europe and as a consequence. Canadian-born British feminist, socialist, sex radical, and birth control campaigner Stella Browne, in her review of Volume II, says "England has already impoverished herself intellectually and covered herself with ridicule by the persecution of the original edition of this psychological classic." It is even said that the social system in Britain is a cause that artificially stimulated sexual inversion because it is a system that suppresses the normal sexual instinct.

In the scientific community Ellis' book was well received. Ellis' contribution to the study of sexual inversion is recognised as relevant and useful. Although the conclusions due to a lack of data they already lead to an understanding of the fact that it does not make sense to try to change the instinct of sexual inverted people. It was also recognised that inversion is not necessarily linked with physical or mental disease. Moreover, the cases presented by Ellis possess great intellect and are therefore an important part of society. Browne desires the legalization of homosexuality as in France and Latin Europe. To others however, Ellis suggestion of a more relaxed law concerning homosexuality is not convincing because of the reported efficacy of the present law. Browne criticises the lack of examples of female sexual inversion as well as the hypothesis that in bisexuals homosexual tendencies are stronger than heterosexual tendencies. The importance of publishing a book about sexual inversion is acknowledged. The lack of understanding of the topic had adverse consequences on the life of homosexual people. Homosexuality was heavily stigmatized and illegal in English society at the time. Ellis "has collected new data, and undoubtedly done a service to pathological psychology." Reading is regarded as necessary for teachers, people working with criminals and parents to prevent sexual inversion from occurring.

== See also ==
- Studies in the Psychology of Sex Vol. 7
