= A Study of British Genius =

1904 book by Havelock Ellis

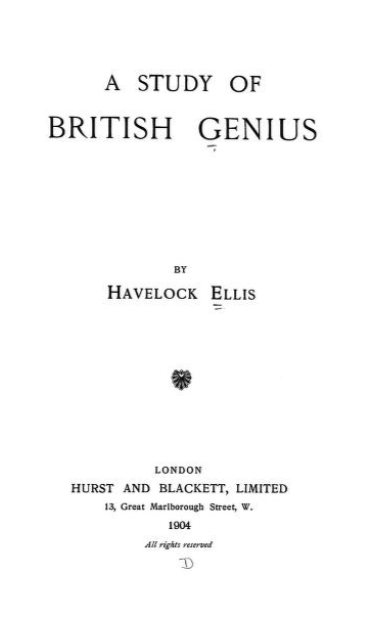
- Title page for A Study of British Genius (1904)
- Author: Havelock Ellis
- Language: English
- Subject: Intellectual giftedness
- Published: 1904
- Publisher: Hurst and Blackett
- Publication place: United Kingdom
- Pages: 300
- OCLC: 1155448962

A Study of British Genius is a 1904 book by Havelock Ellis published by Hurst and Blackett.

== Contents ==
After an introduction, the book delves into chapters on race and nationality, social class, heredity, childhood, marriage, life, pathology, stature, pigments, other miscellaneous things, and a conclusion. Ellis began by saying people had not been able to have an efficient comprehensive study of men and women before him. The Dictionary of National Biography had a large collection of descriptions of people, but it had been too unwieldy and large to be useful. Ellis then analyzed people and their natural tendencies to contribute successfully to society, but people born into royalty were excluded. They couldn't be included with the rest of the population because they were given advantages at a young age that others were not. The term genius is used to describe intelligence every time the word is mentioned throughout the text. He examined the concept of tracking down the origin of intelligence to a specific region of the world. In order to do this, each person was asked about their birthplace to create an accurate record. The best way of asking was to ask each grandparent where they came from. In the chapter on social class, to determine the social class of people most precisely, the fathers were asked what their occupation was. The occupation had to be the one at the time of the child's birth.

The upper class was separated from the other occupations as its own group, and then underneath this, Ellis put the following: yeoman and farmers, church, law, army, navy, medicine, miscellaneous professions, officials, commercial, crafts, and then artisans and unskilled. So, based on the categories, Ellis did not consider any of these other professions in the upper class. He also suggested that the order of the professions may actually be considered a hierarchical relationship that others could use. When observing professions that are primarily in farms or in rural areas, Ellis decided that these places provided a much larger potential for intellectual development than urban cities. The predictions for the future were that he did not believe the cities would ever catch up to the rural growth. Dividing this further, he felt that individuals in rural areas of the lowest classes were able to achieve greater intellectual contributions than those in urban areas. In the section talking about heredity, it seems that Ellis supported the idea that it is a large part of people's natural intelligence. He also said that it was not the only concept that mattered. Ellis then considered childhood and youth. He pointed out that most of the people who grew up to be prominent people, such as Charles Dickens, had very delicate childhoods. Some of them were not expected to live past infancy, and some almost died. Many of these people also had parents who had died before or after the birth of their children. Ellis argued that this also showed the inherited frailty of families.

There was a comparison showing that people who were regarded as significantly intelligent were educated in the UK, Scotland, Ireland, and were at the most notable universities. Ellis pointed out that his studies were not the only ones to include these universities and regions in their results. He suggested that this wasn't a sweeping generalization that did not take exceptions into account; that it was instead more of a predisposition. Those who went to college or attained some sort of level of higher education were far more likely than others to be intelligent, prominent people of society. Marriage was not seen in most of the prominent men that he studied. However, he pressed the idea that men who did not marry, did not necessarily do so because of intellectual absorption. Many of the men had actually considered marriage, or did not live to the age where they would be likely to marry, or had certain problems that hindered it. He was very careful to show that this category was not quite so clear. For those who did marry, they married at much later ages than the rest of the men Ellis had studied, and they married even later than their fathers, who Ellis also thought married much later than other men. This later year was an average of 31.1 years of age.

== Historical relevance ==
In examining how others viewed Ellis's work, some scholars suppose that Robert Knox, a professor at Edinburgh, was influenced by many of the topics discussed in this book, such as the characterization of mental and emotional qualities in people all over Britain. The book has also been credited as one of a few influential works examining how creativity is inherited. It is trusted as a book that observes individuals who are related and unrelated and the differences between creativity amongst them.

Since Ellis, many researchers in psychology have looked at sibling studies, especially when considering order of childbirth. Many of these researchers still see Ellis as someone who found substantial support to back up findings from others, such as the statistician Francis Galton. The idea he specifically supported was that people who were first born were more likely to be gifted and represented more than people who were not first born. In modern times, this theory has been contested by other studies, but his ideas are still being considered and debated, with both support and criticism.

Another idea he professed that has since been studied extensively by other researchers was the link between mental illness and intelligent people. Ellis himself found no link between the two when compared to the general population. He said that there were indeed people with mental illness who were intelligent as well, but it was not significant. Since then, multiple studies have shown links between schizophrenia and manic-depressive disorder, directly combating Ellis' idea that the link does not exist. There is still room for debate as more research is created concerning mental illness.

Ellis also made attempts in his work to show that people who were white with Nordic features were the ones who would be most likely to be geniuses, and those with darker features were highly unlikely to be as intelligent. This was shown through the data he collected, where most people he described that had contributed significantly to math and science had these characteristics. Another book, written by R. Ochse, titled Before the Gates of Excellence questioned these findings, claiming that these trends are quite different today. Ochse said that as of 1990 at least, Jewish people are the ones who have been most successful in the field of science.

== Reception ==
The author appears to regard intellect as the essential characteristic of genius, and to assume it was by virtue of intellect that all of his subjects won distinction. But the matter surely is far more complex than this ... Mr. Ellis has endeavoured to carry a stage further an inquiry which is very interesting and may become one day very important. And those who care sufficiently about the ultimate problems of society to care that they be treated scientifically will feel that they owe him a debt of gratitute.

His material is limited from the first by the caprice or by the knowledge of one set of biographers. Graver still as a defect in most of his general conclusions is the absence of "control" information with regard to normal persons for comparison with his class of "genius," and this defect becomes more glaring when it is considered that the bulk of his statistics is derived from centuries earlier than the last, to which even our general impression of the normal at the present time are probably inapplicable.
