= Golden shower controversy =

Controversy involving former Brazilian president Jair Bolsonaro

Avatar of Jair M. Bolsonaro

Jair M. Bolsonaro
(@jairbolsonaro)
tweeted:

O que é golden shower?

Translation:

What is a golden shower?

6 March 2019

The golden shower controversy refers to the repercussions of two posts made by Jair Bolsonaro, then president of Brazil, on his Twitter account. On March 5, 2019, Bolsonaro published a video of a sexual act involving urine that took place at Carnival, suggesting that that scene was common. The next day, he published: "What is golden shower?", a term that describes the act in the video. The two posts were criticized by both supporters and critics of the president, and had international repercussions. The term "golden shower" has seen an increase in popularity on Google and Pornhub, as well as being mentioned on TV shows. Some commented that the post could harm Carnival's image.

The Palácio do Planalto and Bolsonaro himself later commented on the controversy. The duo that appears in the original video declared that the act was "political-artistic" and, days later, filed a complaint against the president at the Supreme Federal Court (STF) demanding that he delete the posts, which was done. Retrospectively, the phrase has been included in lists of controversial and striking facts about the Bolsonaro government and has been analyzed as an example of his "phallic obsession" and his "foolish verbiage".

== Context ==
On March 5, 2019, Jair Bolsonaro, the president of Brazil, published a pornographic video on his Twitter account that had been recorded the previous day at the "Blocu" Carnival parade in São Paulo and showed two men dancing at a cab stand, one of whom inserts his finger into his anus and bends down for the other to urinate on him. Bolsonaro published the text: "I don't feel comfortable showing it, but we have to expose the truth for the population to be aware and always take their priorities. This is what has become of many street blocks in the Brazilian carnival. Comment and draw your conslusions [sic]". About two hours later, the video was flagged as having "sensitive content", which it had not been at first. Although Bolsonaro suggested that this scene was common at Carnival, participants at the event said the incident was just an isolated case. The day after the video was published, Bolsonaro posted on his Twitter account the question: "What is golden shower?". The term refers to sexual acts that involve urinating on one's partner.

== Repercussions ==
Within twelve hours, the video had already been watched by 1.92 million people. By midday on March 6, the video had over 8,000 retweets, over 46,000 likes and 39,000 comments, while the question had 28,000 retweets, over 54,000 likes and 18,000 comments. Among the international Trending Topics were the hashtags #ImpeachmentBolsonaro, #BolsonaroTemRazão, #goldenshowerpresidente and #VergonhaDessePresidente. The publication of the video was criticized by both supporters and opponents of Bolsonaro, and several users commented that they would report the video to Twitter for inappropriate content. Some users noted that Bolsonaro brought to the public themes that he himself had always considered inappropriate for mass circulation.

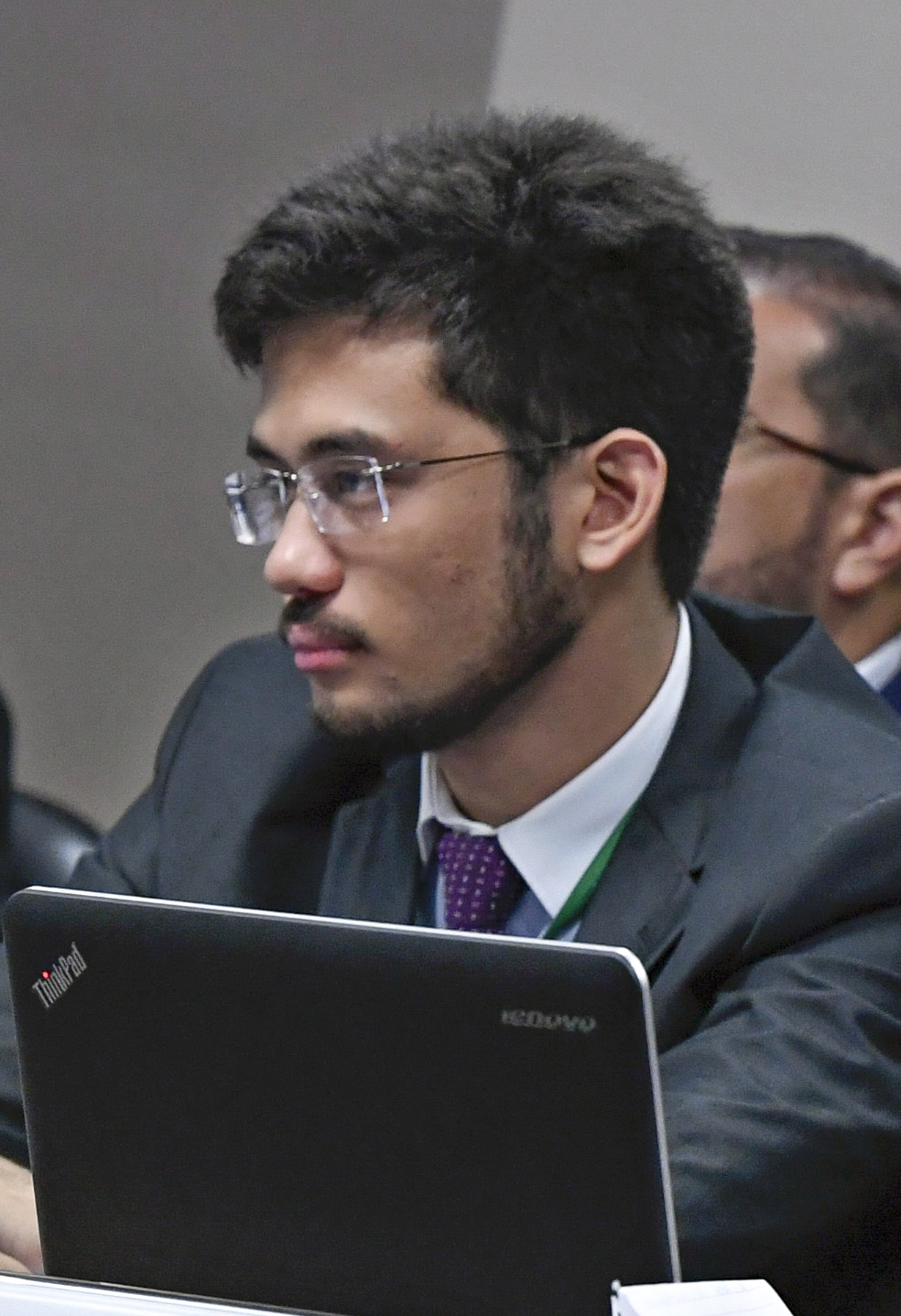
Kim Kataguiri, who supported Bolsonaro in the second round, was one of the critics of the post.

Notable critics included Kim Kataguiri, leader of the Free Brazil Movement (MBL). He even campaigned for Bolsonaro in the 2018 runoff election, but said the publication "is incompatible with the posture of a president, even more a right-wing one". Fernando Holiday, also a member of the group, classified the post as "unworthy for the position", Ana Carla Abrão, former secretary of Finance of Goiás, classified it as "absurd", and Senator Humberto Costa called the president "pathetic". Congresswoman Carla Zambelli defended the president.

Political scientist Mara Telles suggested that the president had violated the decorum of office with the post. Jurist and former Justice Minister Miguel Reale Júnior, who was one of the authors of Dilma Rousseff's impeachment request, agreed with this opinion, commenting that this could justify the opening of an impeachment request against Bolsonaro. Janaina Paschoal, also one of the authors of the request, disagreed, saying that "[the] post is not enough for that". On the 13th, an impeachment request was filed by lawyer and artist Diva Maria dos Santos due to the publication. This was one of the first impeachment petitions made against Bolsonaro.

The question published by Bolsonaro had international repercussions, being reported by the American newspaper The New York Times, the British The Independent and The Guardian, the Paraguayan Última Hora, the Argentine Infobae, the Mexican Excelsior, the Spanish El País and the French Le Monde. Some experts assessed to UOL that the post could harm the growth of the "Carnival industry" in 2020, while others said the impact would be low. A few said the act "helps perpetuate a negative image for one of Brazil's tourism landmarks". Marcelo Pontes, a marketing professor at ESPM São Paulo, commented, "To say that Carnival is that is intellectual dishonesty."

The post inspired the creation of internet memes. From March 5 to March 6, porn video site Pornhub recorded a 688% increase in searches for the term "golden shower". On its official Twitter, the platform commented: "Thanks to you, now all Brazilians know what Golden Shower means!" On day 8, Google recorded a 4,950% increase in searches for the term. The program Fantástico made a joke showing the sexologist of the program Altas Horas, Laura Müller, replying to Bolsonaro's tweet, by saying: "I found the joke very funny. I loved it." On the 10th, comedian John Oliver, host of Last Week Tonight, mentioned Bolsonaro's question on the show. On the 17th, at a protest in front of the White House, a Brazilian woman held up a sign reading "what is a golden shower?".

== Feedback ==
=== Government ===
On the night of the 6th, the Palácio do Planalto released a note saying that Bolsonaro had "no intention of criticizing Carnival in a generic way", but rather "to characterize a clear distortion of the festive spirit, which symbolizes the fun, irony, healthy criticism and creativity of our largest and most democratic popular festival". On the 19th, Bolsonaro spoke out about the controversy, telling Shannon Bream of Britain's Fox News that the video was already on the internet and "we just shared it to try to show how badly carnival is going in Brazil".

=== Duo of the video and removal ===
On March 7, the duo from the video spoke out, saying that the act was "political-artistic" and "planned with the intention of communicating a message from artists" who define themselves as "queer", and declared to be "against conservatism and against the colonization of our bodies and our sexual practices". On the 19th, the lawyers of the duo in the video filed a writ of mandamus with the Supreme Federal Court (STF), demanding that Bolsonaro delete the publications, a "still nebulous" and "little discussed area of legislation", according to BBC News Brasil, considering that "Brazilian justice has never ordered any president of the Republic to delete posts made on social networks". Two days later, the posts were deleted. In this context, the reporting minister Marco Aurélio Mello issued an extinctive judgment, judging that the case was dismissed. Likewise, he judged that the procedural route chosen by the applicants (preventing the President from publishing similar posts on social networks) was inappropriate for the purpose for which it was intended.

== Legacy ==
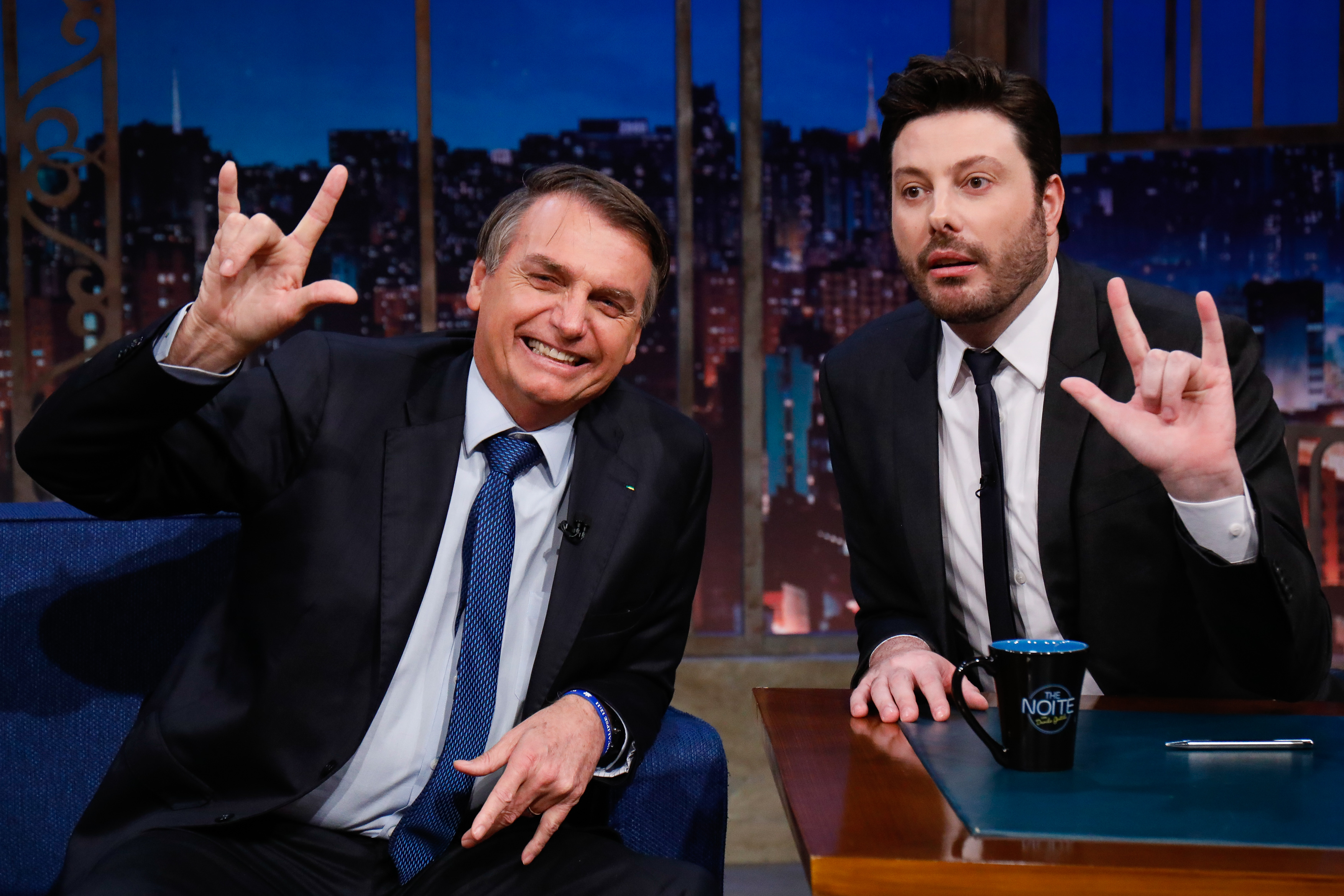
Jair Bolsonaro on The Noite com Danilo Gentili, in the same episode where Danilo mentions the controversy.

On May 30, Danilo Gentili asked Bolsonaro, when he was on his show The Noite com Danilo Gentili: "Did you find out what golden shower is?" Bolsonaro replied: "I still don't know what that is, I don't want to know. I'm a bit old for that."

Google pointed out that the question "what is golden shower" was the fourth most searched in the "what is" category in Brazil in 2019, with peak interest in the month of March. The post was mentioned in the article "From golden shower to hyenas: Bolsonaro's controversial posts in 2019", by Correio Braziliense. UOL cited the phrase among the president's most notorious that year, and in March 2020, a journalist and columnist for the site, Leonardo Sakamoto, cited the case as one of eight "smoke screens of the Bolsonaro government". In October, Diário de Notícias declared that the phrase was one of Bolsonaro's ten most striking in two years in office. Veja's Eduardo Gonçalves said that the government's first year was "off the charts", commenting that "[the] posting of the video with the golden shower at Carnival and other useless polemics on social networks took up a good amount of time from someone who sold himself to the electorate as a politician in a hurry to get the country out of the mess".

In Carnival 2020, "Blocu" passed by the same place where the video published by Bolsonaro was and staged a golden shower act. The group commented that it did not intend to provoke the president, but to defend sexual freedom. On March 5, 2020, exactly one year after the video was posted, the duo featured in it launched the pornographic production company Ediyporn.

=== Analysis ===
In June 2019, Folha de S.Paulo published the article "From 'golden shower' to jokes with Japanese, phallic obsession marks Bolsonaro", where experts comment on Bolsonaro's fixation with genitals and sexuality. According to the psychoanalyst and columnist Contardo Calligaris, "if Bolsonaro felt overwhelmed by that situation, it is because something resonates with him. Not that he has the fantasy of doing it [the golden shower], but the possible sexual dimension of it appeared to him somewhere to the point of arousing him". In July 2021, Carlos José Marques, editorial director of Editora Três, evaluated Bolsonaro's language, saying: "His expressions are naturally abject, from the anthological 'golden shower', which he greeted as soon as he took office [...] From the 'golden shower' to the personalized 'poop' on himself, it was a scatological succession of pimp words and mental garbage that assault and cause disgust".

== See also ==
- Controversies involving Jair Bolsonaro
