= Troughman =

Australian underground writer

Barry Charles (born 1949/50), better known as Troughman (/tɹɒfmæn/), is an Australian underground celebrity known for his paraphilia of urolagnia (also known as urophilia) in toilets at Sydney gay venues in the late 1970s through 2000s.

== Biography ==
Growing up in Punchbowl, New South Wales, Barry Charles realized he was gay by the age of 17. Later this experience led him to believe that laws that criminalised homosexuality had to be changed. Charles participated in the first Sydney Mardi Gras.

Charles was first exposed to urolagnia in New York during a 1978 visit to the Mineshaft bar. After returning to Australia, he repurposed the shared urinal (commonly known as a "trough") in the men's room at Signal, Sydney's first leather bar, a habit that earned him the Troughman moniker. Describing his experience, Troughman began by crouching down and leaning against the urinal, before engaging in the signature activity: "no longer kneeling or crouching, I lie right down in the urinal." Troughman also engaged in other watersports, and recalls using the bandana code.

For Troughman, the Hordern Pavilion offered a safe space for sexual expression in the 1980s and 1990s. As a result of Fox Studio's control of the site, and their implementation of Occupational Health and Safety he ceased to party there. By the early 2000s in the Sydney gay community, it was said that "Troughman has become a cultural icon, an almost mythical figure," and he was particularly famous for his role in the Sydney Mardi Gras parties. By 1996, Troughman had been mentioned in the mainstream media in relation to the Sleaze Ball.

Charles was interviewed by Kerry Bashford for Campaign magazine, accompanied by a photograph by Garrie Maguire. Sponge magazine, a small underground design publication edited by Mark Sykes, also ran a story; again Maguire was commissioned to make the accompanying photograph, though it did not get printed, due to its literal interpretation of the subject. The photo was later seen in a Leather pride exhibition.

Barry Charles was interviewed on GayWaves, a community radio program, where he spoke about his fetish and how he saw it as part of the gay sexual revolution of the '70s and '80s. Charles was active in the gay rights movement in Sydney. He was founding secretary of University of New South Wales Gay Liberation, a participant in the June 1978 street march from which grew the Sydney Gay and Lesbian Mardi Gras and Co-Convenor of Gay Rights Lobby 1981–1984. Gay rights campaigning led to the decriminalisation of homosexual acts in New South Wales in 1984.

Part of the myth of Troughman included persistent rumours of death. Troughman's cultural impact entered into mainstream Australian culture, where by 2007, his practices could be referred to off-hand in relation to public urinals, and comprise part of contemporary Australian myth.

In 2026, Troughman was canonised as "Saint Barry the Golden" by the Sisters of Perpetual Indulgence in recognition of his promotion of sex-positivity, self-love, and sexual-exploration and commitment to advancing LGBTQ+ civil rights.

== Film ==
The 1998 short film Troughman, directed by Kellie Henneberry, was screened at the International Gay & Lesbian Film Festival in the United States.

== Radio ==
Kirsti Melville; Greg Appel Searching For Troughman, Earshot, Radio National, Australian Broadcasting Corporation, May 2017.

== Television ==
Series 7 of the Australian Broadcasting Corporation's documentary show You Can't Ask That featured Troughman in 2022 as it explored gay men's views towards taboos.
