= Havelock Ellis =

British physician, eugenicist, writer and social reformer (1859–1939)

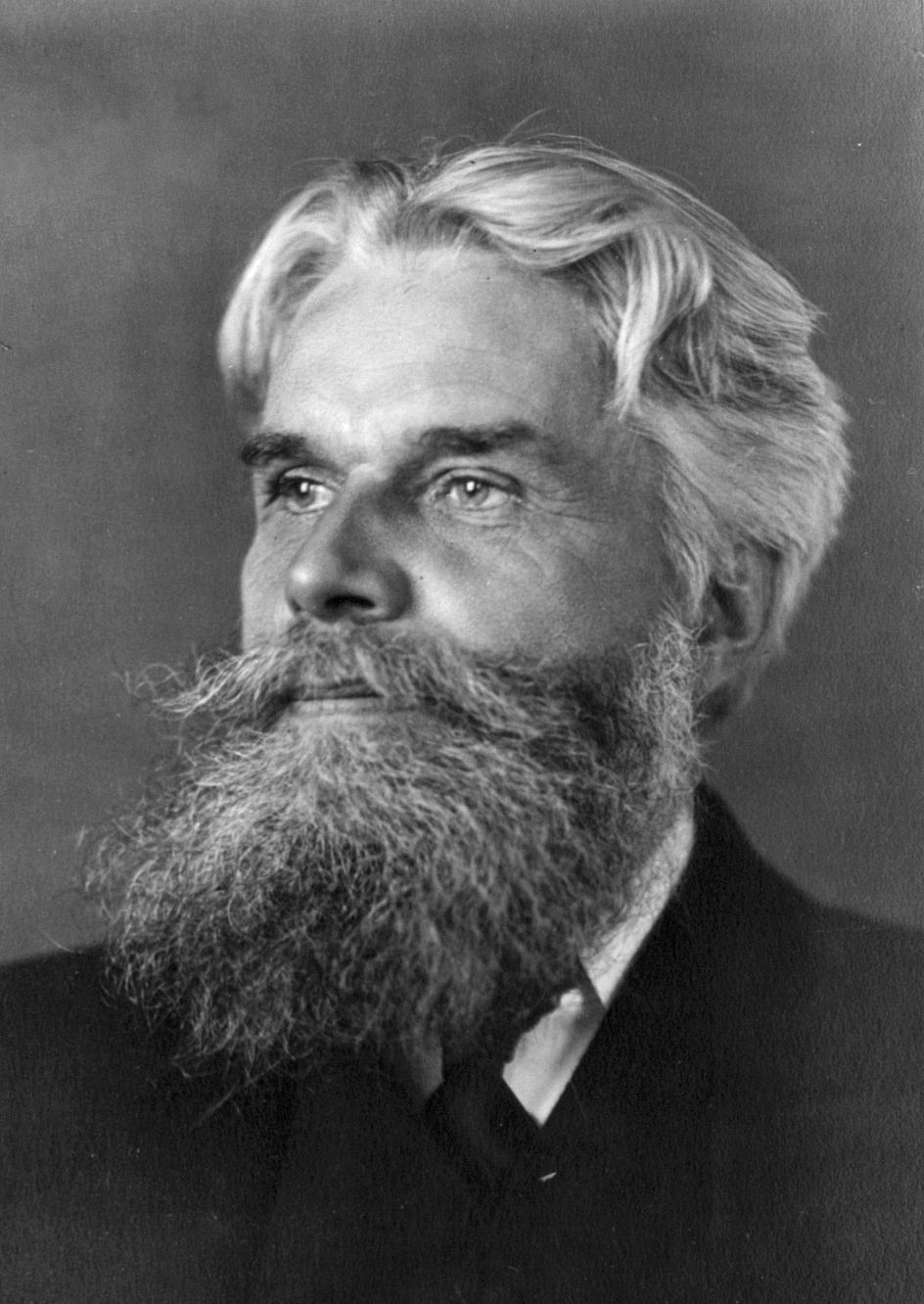
- Ellis in 1913
- Born: Henry Havelock Ellis; 2 February 1859; Croydon, Surrey, England
- Died: 8 July 1939 (aged 80); Hintlesham, Suffolk, England
- Education: King's College London
- Occupations: Physician; eugenicist; writer
- Years active: 1879−1931
- Spouse: Edith Ellis (m. 1891; died 1916)

Henry Havelock Ellis (2 February 1859 – 8 July 1939) was an English physician, eugenicist, writer, progressive intellectual and social reformer who studied human sexuality. He co-wrote the first medical textbook in English on homosexuality in 1897, and also published works on a variety of sexual practices and inclinations, as well as on transgender psychology. He developed the notions of narcissism and autoeroticism, later adopted by psychoanalysis.

Ellis was among the pioneering investigators of psychedelic drugs and the author of one of the first written reports to the public about an experience with mescaline, which he conducted on himself in 1896. He supported eugenics and served as one of 16 vice-presidents of the Eugenics Society from 1909 to 1912.

== Early life and career ==
Ellis, son of Edward Peppen Ellis and Susannah Mary Wheatley, was born in Croydon, Surrey (now part of Greater London). He had four sisters, none of whom married. His father was a sea captain and an Anglican, while his mother was the daughter of a sea captain who had many other relatives that lived on or near the sea. When he was seven his father took him on one of his voyages, during which they called at Sydney, Australia; Callao, Peru; and Antwerp, Belgium. After his return, Ellis attended the French and German College near Wimbledon, and afterward attended a school in Mitcham.

In April 1875, Ellis sailed on his father's ship for Australia; soon after his arrival in Sydney, he obtained a position as a master at a private school. After the discovery of his lack of training, he was fired and became a tutor for a family living a few miles from Carcoar, New South Wales. He spent a year there and then obtained a position as a master at a grammar school in Grafton, New South Wales. The headmaster had died and Ellis carried on at the school for that year, but was unsuccessful.

== Medicine and psychology ==
Ellis returned to England in April 1879. He had decided to take up the study of sex and felt his first step must be to qualify as a physician. He studied at St Thomas's Hospital Medical School, now part of King's College London, but never had a regular medical practice. His training was aided by a small legacy and also income earned from editing works in the Mermaid Series of lesser known Elizabethan and Jacobean drama. He joined The Fellowship of the New Life in 1883, meeting other social reformers Eleanor Marx, Edward Carpenter and George Bernard Shaw.

The 1897 English translation of Ellis's book Sexual Inversion, co-authored with John Addington Symonds and originally published in German in 1896, was the first English medical textbook on homosexuality. It describes male homosexual relations. Ellis wrote the first objective study of homosexuality, as he did not characterise it as a disease, immoral, or a crime. The work assumes that same-sex love transcended age taboos as well as gender taboo. The work also uses the term bisexual throughout. The first edition of the book was bought-out by the executor of Symonds's estate, who forbade any mention of Symonds in the second edition.

In 1897 a bookseller was prosecuted for stocking Ellis's book. Although the term homosexual is attributed to Ellis, he wrote in 1897, "'Homosexual' is a barbarously hybrid word, and I claim no responsibility for it." In fact, the word homosexual was coined in 1868 by the Hungarian author Karl-Maria Kertbeny.

Ellis may have developed psychological concepts of autoeroticism and narcissism, both of which were later developed further by Sigmund Freud. Ellis's influence may have reached Radclyffe Hall, who would have been about 17 years old at the time Sexual Inversion was published. She later referred to herself as a sexual invert and wrote of female "sexual inverts" in Miss Ogilvy Finds Herself and The Well of Loneliness. When Ellis bowed out as the star witness in the trial of The Well of Loneliness on 14 May 1928, Norman Haire was set to replace him but no witnesses were called.

=== Eonism ===
Ellis studied what today are called transgender phenomena. Together with Magnus Hirschfeld, Havelock Ellis is considered a major figure in the history of sexology to establish a new category that was separate and distinct from homosexuality. Aware of Hirschfeld's studies of transvestism, but disagreeing with his terminology, in 1913 Ellis proposed the term sexo-aesthetic inversion to describe the phenomenon. In 1920 he coined the term eonism, which he derived from the name of a historical figure, the Chevalier d'Éon. Ellis explained:

On the psychic side, as I view it, the Eonist is embodying, in an extreme degree, the aesthetic attitude of imitation of, and identification with, the admired object. It is normal for a man to identify himself with the woman he loves. The Eonist carries that identification too far, stimulated by a sensitive and feminine element in himself which is associated with a rather defective virile sexuality on what may be a neurotic basis.

Ellis found eonism to be "a remarkably common anomaly", and "next in frequency to homosexuality among sexual deviations", and categorized it as "among the transitional or intermediate forms of sexuality". As in the Freudian tradition, Ellis postulated that a "too close attachment to the mother" may encourage eonism, but also considered that it "probably invokes some defective endocrine balance".

Havelock Ellis used literary examples from Balzac and several French poets and writers to develop his framework to identify sexual inversion in women.

== Marriage ==
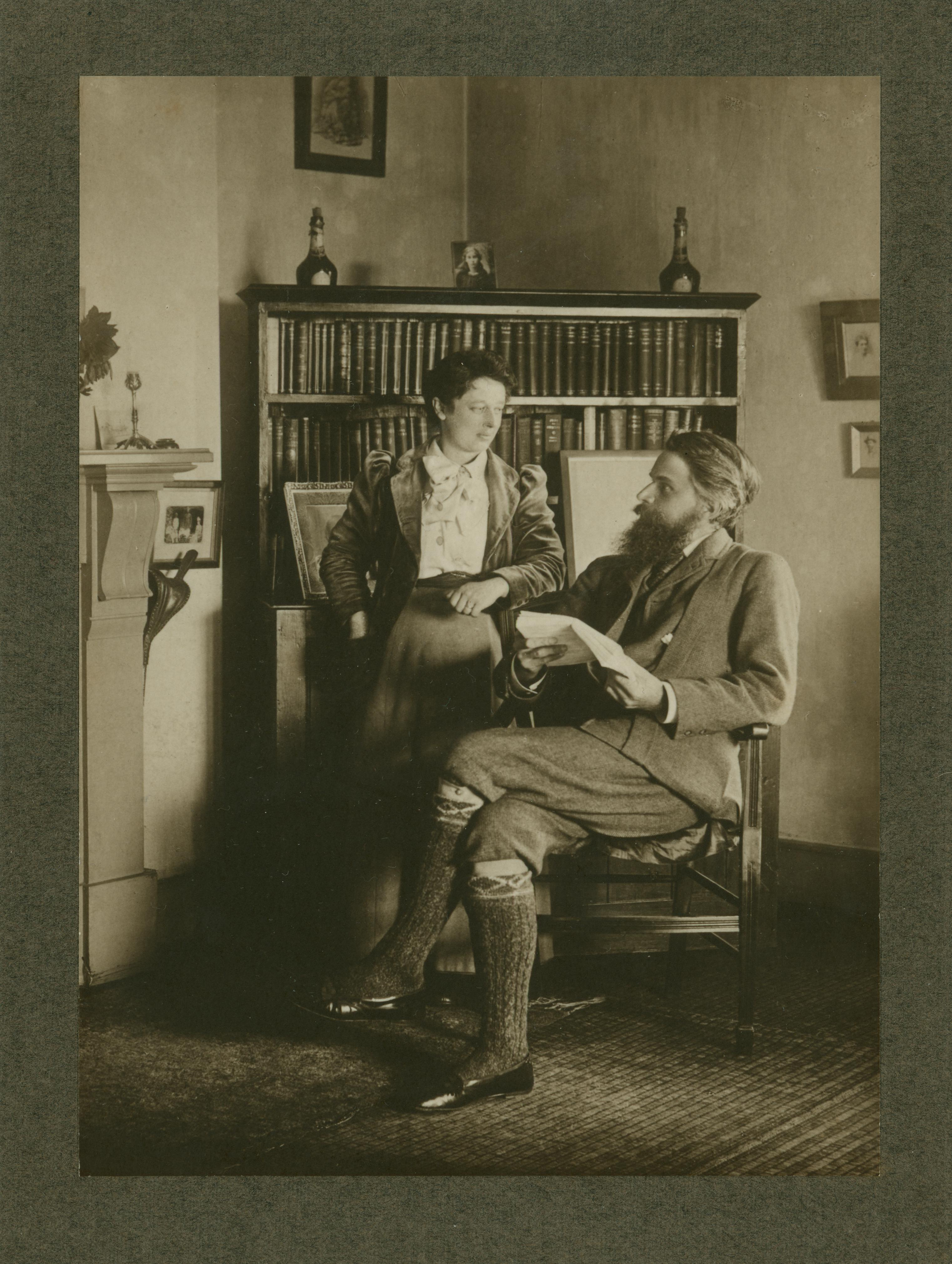
Edith Lees and Havelock Ellis

In November 1891, at the age of 32, and reportedly still a virgin, Ellis married the English writer and proponent of women's rights Edith Lees. From the beginning, their marriage was unconventional, as Lees was a lesbian. At the end of the honeymoon, Ellis went back to his bachelor rooms in Paddington. She lived at a Fellowship House in Bloomsbury. Their "open marriage" was the central subject in Ellis's autobiography, My Life. He reportedly had an affair with Margaret Sanger.

According to Ellis in My Life, his friends were much amused at his being considered an expert on sex. Some knew that he reportedly suffered from impotence until the age of 60, when he discovered that he could become aroused by the sight of a woman urinating. Ellis named this "undinism". After his wife died, Ellis formed a relationship with a French woman, Françoise Lafitte (better known as Françoise Delisle).

== Eugenics ==
Ellis was a supporter of eugenics. He served as vice-president to the Eugenics Education Society and wrote on the subject, among others, in The Task of Social Hygiene:

Eventually, it seems evident, a general system, whether private or public, whereby all personal facts, biological and mental, normal and morbid, are duly and systematically registered, must become inevitable if we are to have a real guide as to those persons who are most fit, or most unfit to carry on the race.

The superficially sympathetic man flings a coin to the beggar; the more deeply sympathetic man builds an almshouse for him so he need no longer beg; but perhaps the most radically sympathetic of all is the man who arranges that the beggar shall not be born.

In his early writings, it was clear that Ellis concurred with the notion that there was a system of racial hierarchies, and that non-western cultures were considered to be "lower races". Before explicitly talking about eugenic topics, he used the prevalence of homosexuality in these 'lower races' to indicate the universality of the behavior. In his work, Sexual Inversions, where Ellis presented numerous cases of homosexuality in Britain, he was always careful to mention the race of the subject and the health of the person's 'stock', which included their neuropathic conditions and the health of their parents. However, Ellis was clear to assert that he did not feel that homosexuality was an issue that eugenics needed to actively deal with, as he felt that once the practice was accepted in society, those with homosexual tendencies would comfortably choose not to marry, and thus would cease to pass the 'homosexual heredity' along.

In a debate in the Sociological Society, Ellis corresponded with the eugenicist Francis Galton, who was presenting a paper in support of marriage restrictions. While Galton analogized eugenics to breeding domesticated animals, Ellis felt that a greater sense of caution was needed before applying the eugenic regulations to populations, as "we have scarcely yet realized how subtle and far-reaching hereditary influences are." Instead—because unlike domesticated animals humans control whom they mate with—Ellis argued that a greater emphasis was needed on public education about how vital this issue was. Ellis thus held much more moderate views than many contemporary eugenicists. In fact, Ellis also fundamentally disagreed with Galton's leading idea that procreation restrictions were the same as marriage restrictions. Ellis believed that those who should not procreate should still be able to experience all the other benefits of marriage, and not to allow those was an intolerable burden. This, in his mind, was what led to eugenics being "misunderstood, ridiculed, and regarded as a fad".

Throughout his life, Ellis was both a member and later a council member of the Eugenics Society. Moreover, he played a role on the General Committee of the First International Eugenics Congress.

== Sexual impulse in youth ==
Ellis's 1933 book, Psychology of Sex, is one of the many manifestations of his interest in human sexuality. In this book, he goes into vivid detail of how children can experience sexuality differently in terms of time and intensity. He mentions that it was previously believed that, in childhood, humans had no sex impulse at all. "If it is possible to maintain that the sex impulse has no normal existence in early life, then every manifestation of it at that period must be 'perverse,'" he adds.

He continues by stating that, even in the early development and lower functional levels of the genitalia, there is a wide range of variation in terms of sexual stimulation. He claims that the ability of some infants to produce genital reactions, seen as "reflex signs of irritation," is typically not vividly remembered. Since the details of these manifestations are not remembered, there is no possible way to determine them as pleasurable. However, Ellis claims that many people of both sexes can recall having agreeable sensations with the genitalia as a child. "They are not (as is sometimes imagined) repressed." They are, however, not usually mentioned to adults. Ellis argues that they typically stand out and are remembered for the sole contrast of the intense encounter to any other ordinary experience.

Ellis claims that sexual self-excitement is known to happen at an early age. He references authors like Marc, Fonssagrives, and Perez in France, who published their findings in the nineteenth century. These "early ages" are not strictly limited to ages close to puberty, as can be seen in their findings. These authors provide cases for children of both sexes who have masturbated from the age of three or four. Ellis references Robie's findings that boys' first sex feelings appear between the ages of five and fourteen. For girls, this age ranges from eight to nineteen.

For both sexes, these first sexual experiences arise more frequently during the later years as opposed to the earlier years. Ellis then references G. V. Hamilton's studies that found twenty percent of males and fourteen percent of females have pleasurable experiences with their sex organs before the age of six. This is only supplemented by Ellis's reference to Katharine Davis's studies, which found that twenty to twenty-nine percent of boys and forty-nine to fifty-one percent of girls were masturbating by the age of eleven. However, in the next three years after, boys' percentages exceeded those of girls.

Ellis also contributed to the idea of varying levels of sexual excitation. He asserts it is a mistake to assume all children are able to experience genital arousal or pleasurable erotic sensations. He proposes cases where an innocent child is led to believe that stimulation of the genitalia will result in a pleasurable erection. Some of these children may fail and not be able to experience this, either pleasure or an erection, until puberty. Ellis concludes, then, that children are capable of a "wide range of genital and sexual aptitude". Ellis even considers ancestry as a contribution to different sexual excitation levels, stating that children of "more unsound heredity" or hypersexual parents are "more precociously excitable".

== Auto-eroticism ==
Ellis's views of auto-eroticism were very comprehensive, including much more than masturbation. Auto-eroticism, according to Ellis, includes a wide range of phenomena. Ellis states in his 1897 book Studies in the Psychology of Sex, that auto-eroticism ranges from erotic day-dreams, marked by a passivity shown by the subject, to "unshamed efforts at sexual self-manipulation witnessed among the insane".

Ellis also argues that auto-erotic impulses can be heightened by bodily processes like menstrual flow. During this time, he says, women, who would otherwise not feel a strong propensity for auto-eroticism, increase their masturbation patterns. This trend is absent, however, in women without a conscious acceptance of their sexual feelings and in a small percentage of women suffering from a sexual or general ailment which results in a significant amount of "sexual anesthesia".

Ellis also raises social concern over how auto-erotic tendencies affect marriages. He goes on to tying auto-eroticism to declining marriage rates. As these rates decline, he concludes that auto-eroticism will only increase in both amount and intensity for both men and women. Therefore, he states, this is an important issue to both the moralist and physician to investigate psychological underpinnings of these experiences and determine an attitude toward them.

== Smell ==
Ellis believed that the sense of smell, although ineffective at long ranges, still contributes to sexual attraction, and therefore, to mate selection. In his 1905 book, Sexual selection in man, Ellis makes a claim for the sense of smell in the role of sexual selection. He asserts that while we have evolved away from dependence on the sense of smell, we still rely on our sense of smell with sexual selection. The contributions that smell makes in sexual attraction can even be heightened with certain climates. Ellis states that with warmer climates come a heightened sensitivity to sexual and other positive feelings of smell among normal populations. Because of this, he believes people are often delighted by odors in the East, particularly in India, in "Hebrew and Mohammedan lands". Ellis then continues by describing the distinct odours in various races, noting that the Japanese race has the least intense of bodily odours. Ellis concludes his argument by stating, "On the whole, it may be said that in the usual life of man odours play a not inconsiderable part and raise problems which are not without interest, but that their demonstrable part in actual sexual selection is comparatively small."

== Views on women and birth control ==
Ellis favoured feminism from a eugenic perspective, feeling that the enhanced social, economic, and sexual choices that feminism provided for women would result in women choosing partners who were more eugenically sound. In his view, intelligent women would not choose, nor be forced to marry and procreate with feeble-minded men.

Ellis viewed birth control as merely the continuation of an evolutionary progression, noting that natural progress has always consisted of increasing impediments to reproduction, which lead to a lower quantity of offspring, but a much higher quality of them. From a eugenic perspective, birth control was an invaluable instrument for the elevation of the race. However, Ellis noted that birth control could not be used randomly in a way that could have a detrimental impact by reducing conception, but rather needed to be used in a targeted manner to improve the qualities of certain 'stocks'. He observed that it was the 'superior stocks' who had knowledge of and used birth control while the 'inferior stocks' propagated without checks. Ellis's solution to this was a focus on contraceptives in education, as this would disseminate the knowledge in the populations that he felt needed them the most. Ellis argued that birth control was the only available way of making eugenic selection practicable, as the only other option was wide-scale abstention from intercourse for those who were 'unfit'.

=== Views on sterilization ===
Ellis was strongly opposed to the idea of castration of either sex for eugenic purposes. In 1909, regulations were introduced at the Cantonal Asylum in Bern which allowed those deemed 'unfit' or with strong sexual inclinations to be subject to mandatory sterilization. In a particular instance, two men and two women, including one person with epilepsy and one who had been arrested for "offences against minors", were castrated. Both of the men had requested it. Ellis considered the behavioral outcomes favorable, but remained staunchly opposed to compulsory sterilization. His view on the origin of these inclinations was that sexual impulses do not reside in the sexual organs, but rather they persist in the brain. Moreover, he posited that the sexual glands provided an important source of internal secretions vital for the functioning of the organism, and thus the glands' removal could greatly injure the patient.

However, already in his time, Ellis was witness to the rise of vasectomies and ligatures of the fallopian tubes, which performed the same sterilization without removing the whole organ. In these cases, Ellis was much more favorable, yet still maintaining that "sterilization of the unfit, if it is to be a practical and humane measure commanding general approval, must be voluntary on the part of the person undergoing it, and never compulsory." His opposition to such a system was not only rooted in morality. Rather, Ellis also considered the practicality of the situation, hypothesizing that if an already mentally unfit man is forced to undergo sterilization, he would only become more ill-balanced, and would end up committing more anti-social acts.

Though Ellis was never at ease with the idea of forced sterilizations, he was willing to find ways to circumvent that restriction. His focus was on the social ends of eugenics, and as a means to it, Ellis was in no way against 'persuading' 'volunteers' to undergo sterilization by withdrawing Poor Relief from them. While he preferred to convince those he deemed unfit using education, Ellis supported coercion as a tool. Furthermore, he supported adding ideas about eugenics and birth control to the education system in order to restructure society, and to promote social hygiene. For Ellis, sterilization seemed to be the only eugenic instrument that could be used on the mentally unfit. In fact, in his publication The Sterilization of the Unfit, Ellis argued that even institutionalization could not guarantee the complete prevention of procreation between the unfit, and thus, "the burdens of society, to say nothing of the race, are being multiplied. It is not possible to view sterilization with enthusiasm when applied to any class of people ... but what, I ask myself, is the practical alternative?"

== Psychedelics ==
Ellis was among the pioneering investigators of psychedelic drugs and the author of one of the first written reports to the public about an experience with mescaline, which he conducted on himself in 1896. He consumed a brew made of three Lophophora williamsii buds in the afternoon of Good Friday alone in his set of rooms in Temple, London. During the experience, lasting for about 12 hours, he noted a plethora of extremely vivid, complex, colourful, pleasantly smelling hallucinations, consisting both of abstract geometrical patterns and objects such as butterflies and other insects. He published two accounts of the experience, one in The Lancet in June 1897 ("A Note on the Phenomena of Mescal Intoxication"), and a second in The Contemporary Review in 1898 ("Mescal: A New Artificial Paradise"). The title of the second article alludes to an earlier work on the effects of mind-altering substances, an 1860 book Les Paradis artificiels by French poet Charles Baudelaire (containing descriptions of experiments with opium and hashish).

Ellis was so impressed with the aesthetic quality of the experience that he gave some specimens of peyote to the Irish poet W. B. Yeats, a member of the Hermetic Order of the Golden Dawn, an organisation of which another mescaline researcher, Aleister Crowley, was also a member.

== Later life and death ==
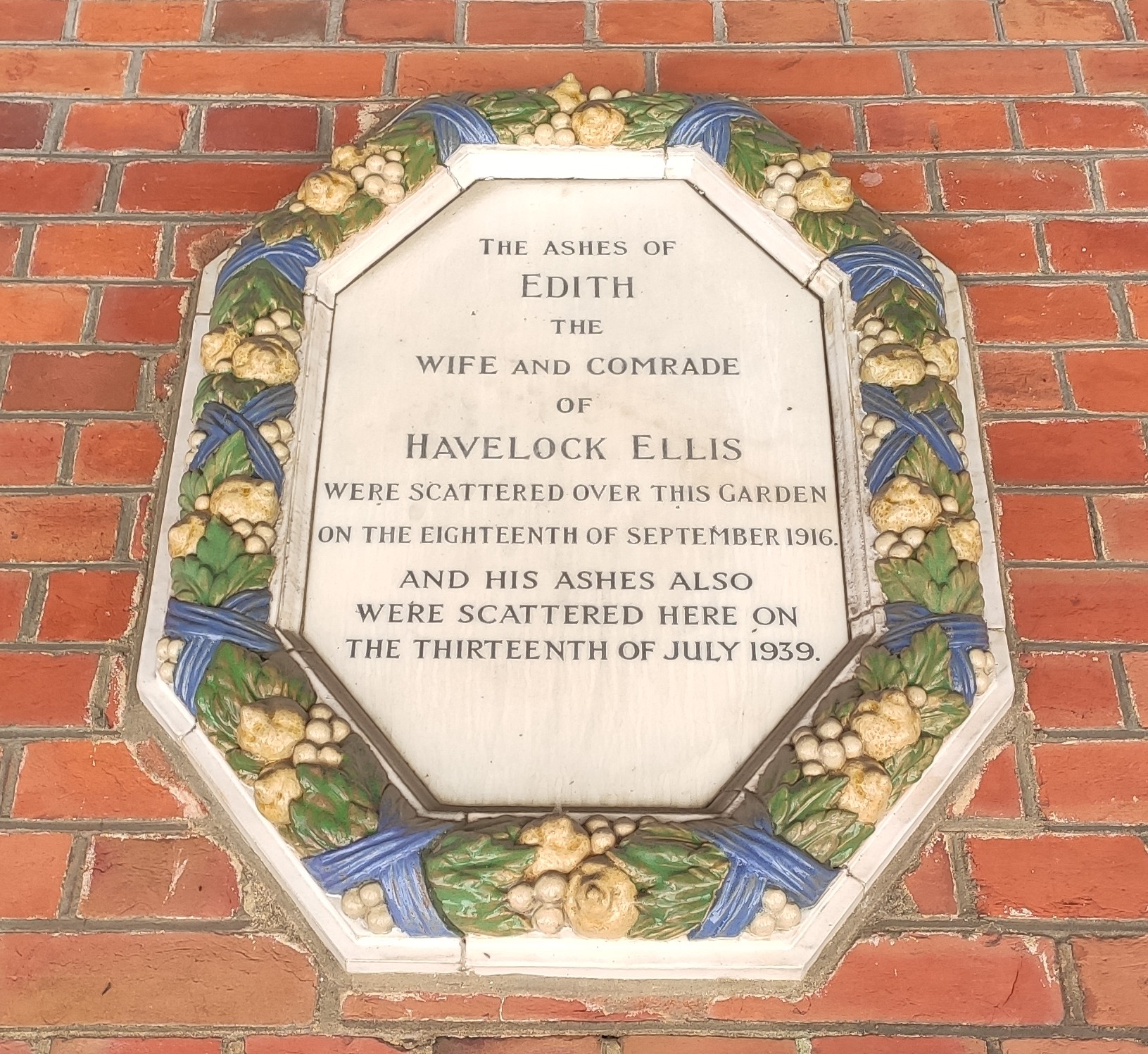
Commemorative plaque dedicated to Ellis and his wife at Golders Green Crematorium

Ellis resigned from his position as a Fellow of the Eugenics Society over its stance on sterilization in January 1931.

Ellis spent the last year of his life at Hintlesham, Suffolk, where he died in July 1939. His ashes were scattered at Golders Green Crematorium, North London, following his cremation.

== Works ==
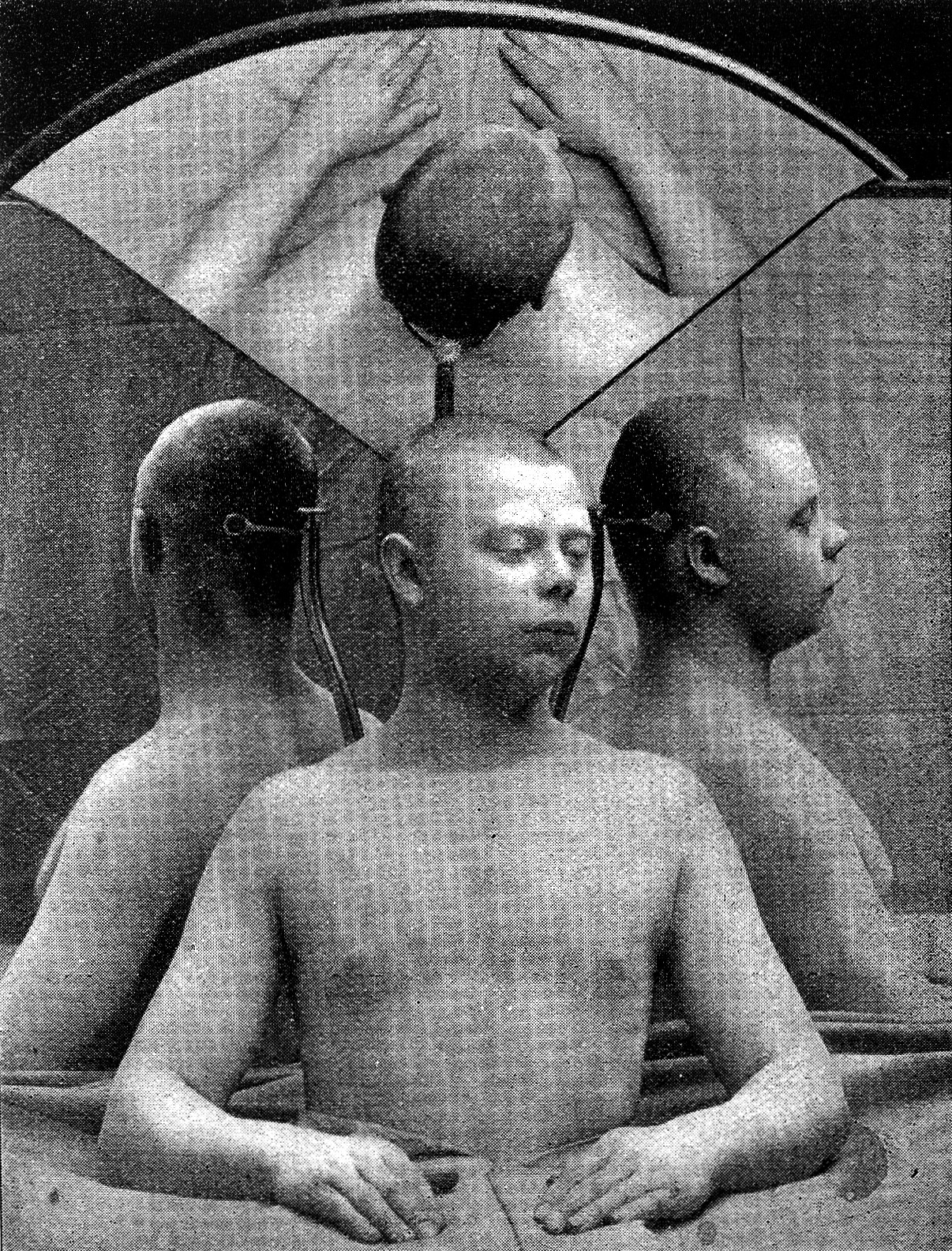
Inmate of Elmira Reformatory showing four views of head The Criminal

- The Criminal (1st edition: 1890, 2nd edition: 1895, 3rd edition: 1901, 4th edition: 1910, 5th edition: 1916)
- The New Spirit (1st edition: 1890, 2nd edition: 1891, 3rd edition: 1892, 4th edition: 1926)
- The Nationalisation of Health (1892)
- Man and Woman: A Study of Secondary and Tertiary Sexual Characteristics (1894) (revised 1929)
- Das konträre Geschlechtsgefühl (in German). Leipzig: Wigand. 1896. p. 1. with J.A. Symonds
- Studies in the Psychology of Sex (1897–1928) seven volumes (listed below)
- Studies in the Psychology of Sex. Vol. 1 The Evolution of Modesty, The Phenomena of Sexual Periodicity, Auto–Erotism. 1897.
- Affirmations (1st edition: 1898, 2nd edition: 1915, New edition: 1926)
- "Mescal: A New Artificial Paradise". The Contemporary Review. LXXIII. 1898.
- The Nineteenth Century: A Dialogue in Utopia (1900)
- Studies in the Psychology of Sex. Vol. 2 Sexual Inversion. 1900.
- Studies in the Psychology of Sex. Vol. 3 Analysis of the Sexual Impulse, Love and Pain, The Sexual Impulse in Women. 1903.
- A Study of British Genius (1st edition: 1904, Revised edition: 1927)
- Studies in the Psychology of Sex. Vol. 4 Sexual Selection in Man. 1905.
- Studies in the Psychology of Sex. Vol. 5 Erotic Symbolism, The Mechanism of Detumescence, The Psychic State in Pregnancy. 1906.
- The Soul of Spain (1st edition: 1908, New edition: 1920)
- "The sterilisation of the unfit". The Eugenics Review. 1 (3): 203–06. 1909. PMC 2986668. PMID 21259474.
- Studies in the Psychology of Sex. Vol. 6 Sex in Relation to Society. 1910.
- The Problem of Race-Regeneration (1911)
- The World of Dreams (1st edition: 1911, New edition: 1926)
- "Birth control and eugenics". The Eugenics Review. 9 (1): 32–41. 1917. PMC 2942166. PMID 21259632.
- Ellis, Havelock (1912). The Task of Social Hygiene. Constable & Company Ltd. p. 10.
- Essays in War-Time. 1917b.
- The Philosophy of Conflict (1919)
- On Life and Sex: Essays of Love and Virtue (1921)
- Kanga Creek: an Australian Idyll. The Golden Cockerel press. 1922.
- Little Essays of Love and Virtue (1922)
- The Dance of Life. 1923.
- Impressions and Comments. Vol. 3. 1924.
- Sonnets, with Folk Songs from the Spanish (1925)
- Eonism and Other Supplementary Studies (1928)
- Studies in the Psychology of Sex Vol. 7 (1928)
- The Art of Life (1929) (selected and arranged by Mrs. S. Herbert)
- More Essays of Love and Virtue (1931)
- ed.: James Hinton: Life in Nature (1931)
- Views and Reviews. 1932.
- Psychology of Sex. 1933.
- ed.: Imaginary Conversations and Poems: A Selection, by Walter Savage Landor (1933)
- Chapman (1934)
- My Confessional (1934)
- Questions of Our Day (1934)
- From Rousseau to Proust (1935)
- Selected Essays (1936)
- Poems (1937) (selected by John Gawsworth; pseudonym of T. Fytton Armstrong)
- Love and Marriage (1938) (with others)
- My life. Houghton Mufflin. 1939.
- Sex Compatibility in Marriage (1939)
- From Marlowe to Shaw (1950) (ed. by J. Gawsworth)
- The Genius of Europe (1950)
- Sex and Marriage (1951) (ed. by J. Gawsworth)
- The Unpublished Letters of Havelock Ellis to Joseph Ishill (1954)

=== Translations ===
- Germinal (by Zola) (1895) (reissued 1933)
- The Psychology of the Emotions by Théodule-Armand Ribot (1897)

== Sources ==
- Crozier, Ivan (2008). "Havelock Ellis, eugenicist". Studies in History and Philosophy of Science Part C: Studies in History and Philosophy of Biological and Biomedical Sciences. 39 (2): 187–94. doi:10.1016/j.shpsc.2008.03.002. ISSN 1369-8486. PMID 18534349.
- Ekins, Richard; King, Dave (2006). The Transgender Phenomenon. SAGE Publications. ISBN 978-0761971634.
- Grosskurth, Phyllis (1980). Havelock Ellis: A Biography. Allen Lane. ISBN 978-0713910711.
- Laplanche, Jean; Pontalis, Jean-Bertrand (1988). The Language of Psycho-analysis. Karnac Books. ISBN 978-0946439492.
- Rudgley, Richard (1993). The alchemy of culture: intoxicants in society. British Museum Press. ISBN 978-0714117362.
- Souhami, Diana (1998). The Trials of Radclyffe Hall. Weidenfeld & Nicolson. ISBN 978-0297818250.
- Thomson, Robert (1968). The Pelican History of Psychology (First ed.). Pelican. p. 463. ISBN 978-0140209044.
- White, Chris (1999). Nineteenth-Century Writings on Homosexuality. CRC Press. p. 66.
- Wilson, Scott (2016). Resting Places: The Burial Sites of More Than 14,000 Famous Persons, 3d ed. McFarland. ISBN 978-1476625997.
- Wyndham, Diana (2012). Norman Haire and the Study of Sex. Sydney University Press. ISBN 978-1743320068.
