= Urolagnia =

Paraphilia associated with urine or urination

- Other names: Urophilia, undinism, golden shower, watersports
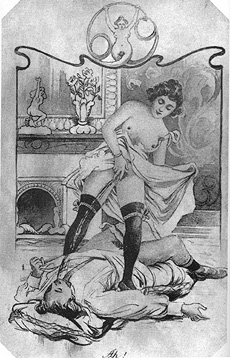
- A woman in stockings raising her skirt and urinating into the mouth of a man

Urolagnia, also known as urophilia, is a paraphilia in which sexual excitement is associated with urine or urination. Etymologically, the term comes from the Greek ouron, meaning 'urine', and lagneia, meaning 'lust'. Golden shower is slang for the practice of urinating on another person for sexual pleasure, while the term watersports is more inclusive of other sexual acts involving urine.

Sexual acts may involve urine being ingested or bathed in, urinating on another person or item (such as bedwetting), and self-soiling. Other expressions of urolagnia may primarily involve the smell of urine.

Omorashi, a fetish for having a full bladder or someone else experiencing the discomfort or pain of a full bladder, is sometimes considered part of urolagnia.

== Frequency ==
A 2007 study counted members of Internet discussion groups with fetish in their names; of the groups about body parts or features, 9% belonged to groups about body fluids (including but not limited to urolagnia).

Jennifer Eve Rehor of San Francisco State University points out that such data as exists on what she calls "unconventional" or "kink" sexual behavior is generally problematic because of the way that it has been collected, through criminal and clinical case studies. Behavior that appears neither in criminal trials nor in clinical studies (for example, because the individuals concerned do not commonly seek professional help) is therefore under-reported. Rehor therefore surveyed 1,764 female participants in "kink" behavior (mostly association with BDSM) in 2010–11, receiving 1,580 valid responses. What Rehor calls "urine play" is relatively infrequent, with only 36.52% of her sample reporting having done it or having had it done to them. In contrast, 93.99% of her sample reported having done spanking or having had it done to them, and 61.96% reported having used or been exposed to feathers/fur. It is impossible to extrapolate Rehor's data onto the general population, as the habits of the general population are different than participants in "kink", but her study does give a guide to prevalence in the North American BDSM community.

In Channel 4's 2017 nationwide Great British Sex Survey, watersports (meaning urolagnia) was ranked ninth in popularity among sexual fetishes in the United Kingdom.

== In psychiatry ==
The DSM-III-R (1987) version of the Diagnostic and Statistical Manual of Mental Disorders (DSM) renamed atypical paraphilia to paraphilia NOS (not otherwise specified), and provided seven nonexhaustive examples of NOS paraphilias, which included urolagnia. Other specified paraphilic disorder is the term currently used by the fifth edition of the Diagnostic and Statistical Manual of Mental Disorders (DSM-5) to refer to any of the many other paraphilic disorders that are not explicitly named in the manual, including urolagnia. In order to be diagnosable, the interest must be recurrent and intense, present for at least six months, and cause marked distress or impairment in important areas of functioning. When a specific paraphilic disorder cannot be identified or the clinician chooses not to specify it for some other reason, the unspecified paraphilic disorder diagnosis may be used instead.

Paraphilias such as urolagnia have been described as fetishes. On 18 June 2018, the WHO (World Health Organization) published ICD-11, in which Fetishism is now removed as a psychiatric diagnosis. Moreover, discrimination against fetish-having (and BDSM) individuals is considered inconsistent with human rights principles endorsed by the United Nations and The World Health Organization.

== Physical health ==
The World Health Organization has found that the pathogens contained in urine rarely pose a health risk. However, it does caution that in areas where Schistosoma haematobium, a parasitic flatworm, is prevalent, it can be transmitted from person to person.

== Handkerchief code ==
A table in Larry Townsend's The Leatherman's Handbook II (the 1983 second edition; the 1972 first edition did not include this list) which is generally considered authoritative states that a yellow handkerchief is a symbol for urolagnia in the handkerchief code, which is employed usually among gay male casual-sex seekers or BDSM practitioners in the United States, Canada, Australia and Europe. Wearing the handkerchief on the left indicates the top, dominant, or active partner; on the right indicates the bottom, submissive, or passive partner. However, negotiation with a prospective partner remains important because, as Townsend noted, people may wear hankies of any color "only because the idea of the hankie turns them on" or "may not even know what it means".

== Notable cases ==
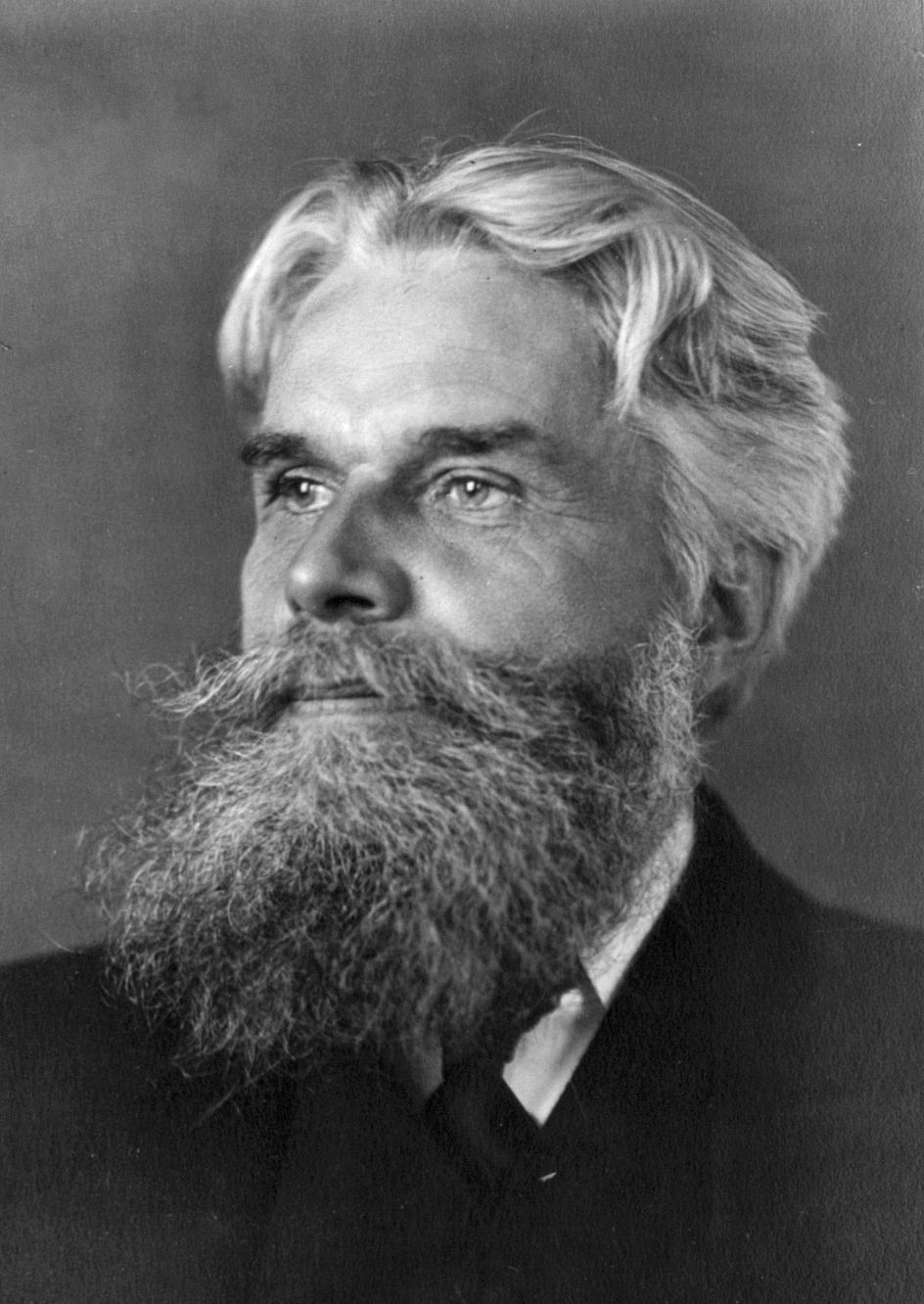
British sexologist Havelock Ellis

- Chuck Berry: American musician who was featured urinating on a woman in a sex tape, and was sued for videotaping dozens of women in the restroom of a restaurant he owned.
- Havelock Ellis: British sexologist who was reportedly impotent until at age sixty he discovered that he was aroused by the sight of a woman urinating.
- Albert Fish: American serial killer, also known as The Grayman and The Boogeyman. He wrote several letters to widows with want-ads in The New York Times and described in detail women urinating on him, inside of him, and in cups so that he could drink it. He later forced children to drink urine.
- R. Kelly: American singer, sentenced to prison for, among other things, urinating on and sexually abusing a fourteen-year-old girl in a videotape.
- Ashley MacIsaac: Nova Scotian fiddler and singer. In 1996, he spoke with a Maclean's interviewer mentioning his sexual life, including his boyfriend and his taste for urolagnia. In 2003, he told an interviewer for the Montreal Mirror that he loves to have men urinate on him.
- Ricky Martin: a Puerto Rican singer. He gave an interview with Blender magazine in which he stated that he enjoyed "giving the golden shower".
- Patrice O'Neal: American standup comedian who had on several occasions mentioned his appreciation for golden showers, even stating that his girlfriend noticing that his urine tasted like "birthday cake" is how he came to find out that he suffered from diabetes.
- Annie Sprinkle: an American porn actress, later turned sex educator and advocate for female sexual enjoyment. Her stage name is derived from her obsession with fluids.
- Troughman: an Australian noted in the Sydney media for lying down in urinal troughs at Sydney Mardi Gras parties and other events.
- Ian Watkins: the former lead singer for the Welsh rock band Lostprophets. Convicted in December 2013 of numerous child sex abuse charges, which included urolagnia.
- Sean Combs: American rapper and producer, indicted for sex trafficking, kidnapping, rape and sexual assault charges. Combs' ex-partner Cassie Ventura has claimed that he frequently urinated on her during the "freak-offs" that she was forced to participate in.

== See also ==
- Golden shower controversy (Bolsonaro)
- Urination and sexual activity
- Urophagia
