= Helen Brotherton (vegetarian) =

English vegetarianism activist (1812–1898)

- Born: 15 April 1812; Salford, Lancashire, England
- Died: 16 May 1898 (aged 86); Salford, Lancashire, England
- Resting place: Weaste Cemetery
- Other name: Ellen Brotherton
- Occupations: Vegetarianism activist; philanthropist
- Organizations: Bible Christian Church; Vegetarian Society (founding member and vice-president)
- Parents: Joseph Brotherton (father); Martha Brotherton (mother)
- Relatives: William Harvey (uncle); James Simpson (cousin-in-law)

Helen Brotherton (15 April 1812 – 16 May 1898), sometimes known as Ellen Brotherton, was an English vegetarianism activist and philanthropist. She was a founding member of the Vegetarian Society and later served as one of its vice-presidents. Brotherton was the daughter of Joseph Brotherton, Salford's first Member of Parliament, and Martha Brotherton (née Harvey), author of the early vegetarian cookbook Vegetable Cookery.

== Biography ==
=== Early life and family ===
Helen Brotherton was born on 15 April 1812 in Salford, Lancashire. She was baptised on 14 May at the Bible Christian Church on King Street, Salford.

Her father was Joseph Brotherton (1783–1857), a minister of the Bible Christian Church from 1817 until his death and Salford's first Member of Parliament, serving from 1832 to 1857. Her mother, Martha Brotherton (née Harvey; 1782–1861), authored Vegetable Cookery, an early vegetarian cookbook. She had four siblings. Her uncle, William Harvey, and cousin-in-law, James Simpson, were also associated with the early Vegetarian Society.

=== Vegetarianism ===
Brotherton was raised in the Bible Christian Church, whose teaching included abstinence from meat, alcohol, and tobacco. She was a lifelong vegetarian and was a founding member of the Vegetarian Society. She served as a vice-president of the society for about 12 years and attended its annual meetings.

=== Family legacy ===
Brotherton donated items from her father's collection to the Peel Park Museum and preserved correspondence relating to him. She also assisted in the production of a sixth edition of her mother's Vegetable Cookery.

=== Later life and death ===
In later life, Brotherton lived in the Pendleton district of Salford and remained associated with the Bible Christian Church.

Brotherton died on 16 May 1898, aged 86. She was buried in the family vault at Weaste Cemetery on 18 May, with Rev. J. Clough officiating. A memorial service was held for her at the Philadelphia Bible Christian Church on 22 May.

== See also ==
- Christian vegetarianism
- History of vegetarianism
- Vegetarianism in the United Kingdom
- Vegetarianism in the Victorian era
- Women and vegetarianism and veganism advocacy
- Women in the Victorian era
