= William Harvey (Bible Christian) =

English social reformer and industrialist (1787–1870)

The Reverend William Harvey JP
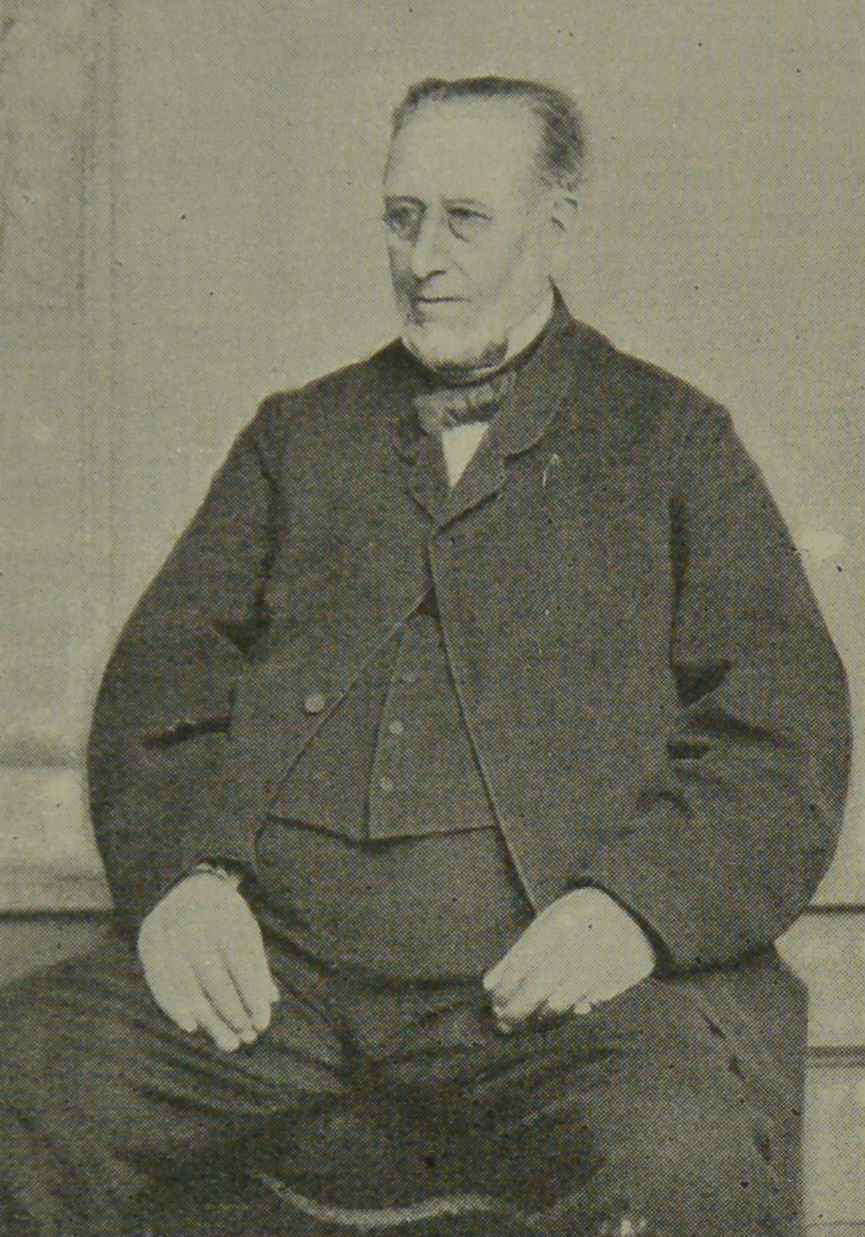
- Harvey in Fifty Years of Food Reform (1898)
- Born: 1787; Whittington, Derbyshire, England
- Died: 25 December 1870 (aged 83); Salford, Greater Manchester, England
- Burial place: Weaste Cemetery, Salford
- Occupations: Social reformer; industrialist; deacon
- Organizations: Bible Christian Church; Vegetarian Society; Manchester and Salford Temperance Union; United Kingdom Alliance; British Anti-Tobacco Society
- Title: Mayor of Salford
- Term: 1857–1858
- Spouse: Mary Titley (m. 1812; died 1857)
- Children: 6
- Relatives: Martha Brotherton (sister); Joseph Brotherton (cousin and brother-in-law); Helen Brotherton (niece); James Simpson (son-in-law)

William Harvey JP (1787 – 25 December 1870) was an English social reformer, industrialist, and Bible Christian deacon. He was active in parliamentary reform, the temperance movement, vegetarianism, and anti-tobacco campaigning. Harvey was associated with the Bible Christian Church from its early years and served as a deacon from 1809 until his death. He held offices in the Vegetarian Society, the Manchester and Salford Temperance Union, and the United Kingdom Alliance, and was vice-president of the British Anti-Tobacco Society. In local government, he was one of Salford's first aldermen, served on the council from 1844 to 1870, and was elected Mayor of Salford in 1857 and 1858.

== Biography ==
=== Early life and family ===
William Harvey was born in Whittington, Derbyshire, in 1787, the son of a yeoman. He had six siblings, including Martha, who later married their cousin Joseph Brotherton and wrote the early vegetarian cookbook Vegetable Cookery. His niece was Helen Brotherton.

Harvey moved to Salford, Greater Manchester, in 1804 to apprentice under Mr Railton in cotton spinning, weaving, and printing, and lived with Brotherton.

=== Bible Christian Church ===
The Bible Christian Church in King Street, Salford, was the centre of Harvey's religious and reform activity. He was associated with the church from its foundation and served as deacon from 1809 until his death in 1870. The church taught abstinence from meat, alcoholic drink, and tobacco.

=== Cotton business ===
In 1810, Harvey entered into partnership with his cousins Joseph and William Brotherton as cotton spinners. After Joseph's retirement and William's death in 1819, the firm passed to Harvey, who then partnered with Charles Tysoe, another member of the Bible Christian Church, under the name Harvey, Tysoe and Co. Their mill, Brotherton Mill, was located on Canal Street, Oldfield Road. Angus Bethune Reach's Manchester and the Textile Districts in 1849 described the firm's treatment of workers, including welfare measures, the exclusion of child labour under 13, and a 10-hour maximum working day. Harvey's sons and grandsons later joined the business.

=== Activism and politics ===
Harvey was involved with the Vegetarian Society, the Manchester and Salford Temperance Union, and the United Kingdom Alliance. He also served as vice-president of the British Anti-Tobacco Society. Harvey was the second president of the Vegetarian Society after the death of his son-in-law, James Simpson. In 1857, he arranged a teetotal and vegetarian banquet.

Harvey was a member of the Little Circle, a group of early 19th-century Manchester political reformers that included Brotherton. He supported parliamentary reform and attended the Peterloo Massacre in 1819. When Salford gained a parliamentary seat in 1832, Harvey served as Brotherton's election agent.

Harvey was an early member of the Anti-Corn Law League and supported repeal of the Corn Laws. Locally, he was part of the Liberal group involved in establishing Salford City Council in 1844. Harvey became a borough constable in 1834, a police commissioner in 1843, and one of Salford's first aldermen. He served as an alderman from 1844 to 1870. He was also a justice of the peace. Harvey was elected Mayor of Salford in 1857 and 1858.

=== Personal life and death ===
On 19 June 1812, Harvey married Mary Titley at Manchester Cathedral. She was born in 1790 in Staffordshire to William and Mary Titley. They had five sons and one daughter. His wife died on 12 October 1857, aged 67. Harvey was a friend of William Cobbett.

Harvey remained on the council until his death on 25 December 1870 at his home at 8 Acton Square, Crescent, Salford, aged 83. He was buried in the family vault at Weaste Cemetery on 30 December, with Rev. James Clark of the Bible Christian Church officiating.

== See also ==
- Christian vegetarianism
- History of vegetarianism
- Vegetarianism in the Victorian era
- Vegetarianism in the United Kingdom
- Temperance movement in the United Kingdom
