= Primitive Cookery =

1767 semi-vegetarian cookbook

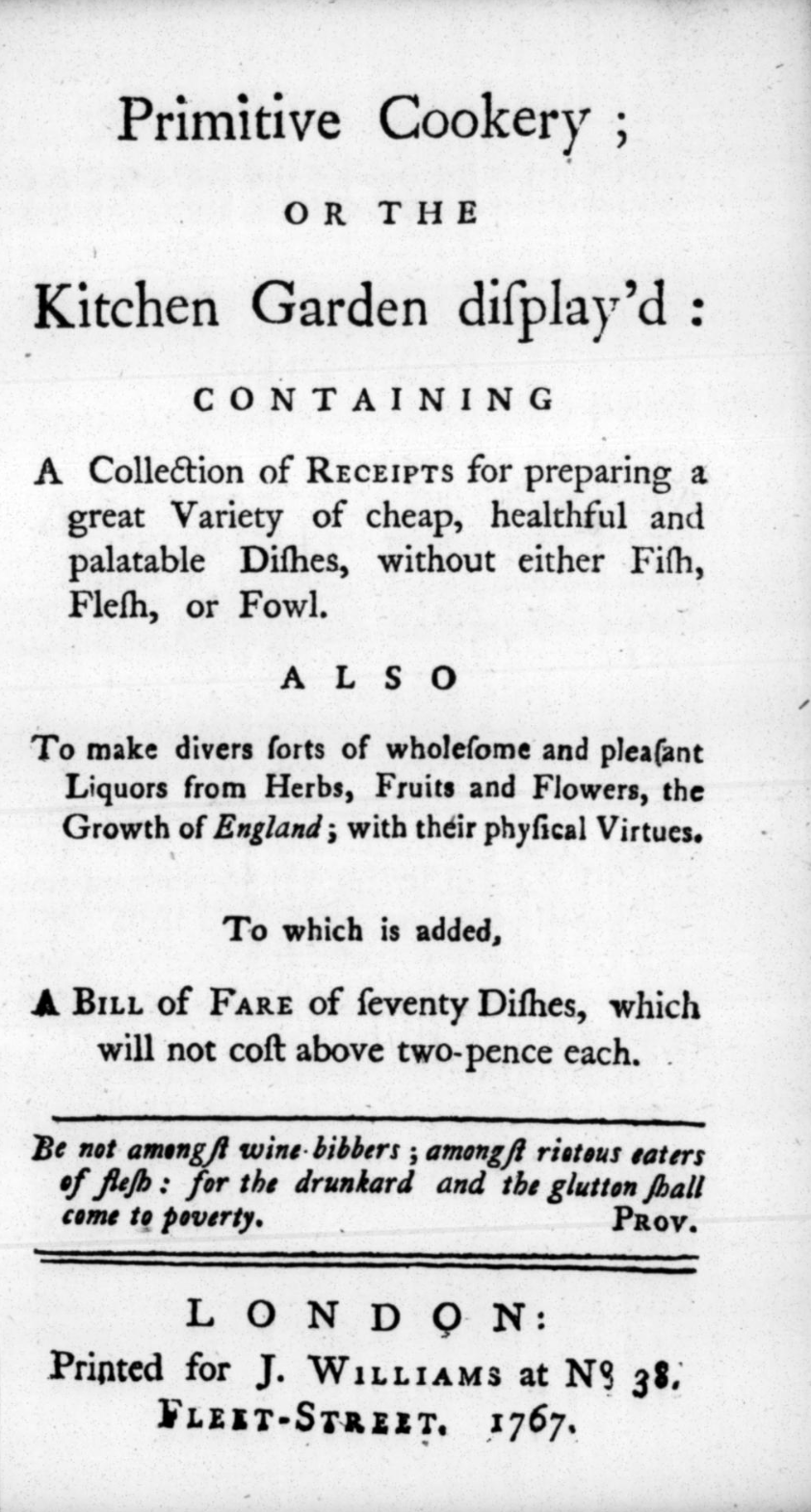
- Second edition title page
- Language: English
- Genre: Cookbook
- Publisher: J. Williams
- Publication date: 1767 (second edition)
- Publication place: Kingdom of Great Britain
- Media type: Print (hardcover)
- Pages: 80
- OCLC: 642606679
- Text: Primitive Cookery at the Internet Archive

Primitive Cookery; or the Kitchen Garden Display'd (Note: Full title: Primitive Cookery; Or the Kitchen Garden Display'd. Containing a Collection of Receipts for Preparing a Great Variety of Cheap, Healthful and Palatable Dishes, Without Either Fish, Flesh, or Fowl; With a Bill of Fare of Seventy Dishes, That Will Not Cost Above Two-Pence Each. Likewise Directions for Pickling, Gathering, and Preserving Herbs, Fruits, and Flowers; With Many Other Articles Appertaining to the Product of the Kitchen-Garden, Orchard, &c.) is an anonymously authored British cookbook whose second edition was published in London in 1767 by John Williams. The edition opens with dietary advice attributed to the physician Theophilus Lobb. It contains inexpensive recipes made principally from vegetables, eggs and dairy products, together with instructions for preparing and preserving produce from the kitchen garden. Although its title advertises dishes prepared without fish or meat, some recipes contain meat.

The book was intended to provide economical meals, particularly for people who could not afford to eat meat regularly. It includes a menu of 70 dishes claimed to cost no more than two pence each, a claim questioned by contemporary reviewers. Later writers have discussed Primitive Cookery as an early vegetarian or semi-vegetarian cookbook, although its inclusion of meat distinguishes it from later works such as Martha Brotherton's Vegetable Cookery (1812).

== Background and publication ==
An earlier anonymous cookbook, Adam's Luxury and Eve's Cookery; or, the Kitchen Garden Display'd, was published in 1743. It has been attributed to Frances Hill. Although the two books share a subtitle, bibliographer Arnold Whitaker Oxford suggested that they were different works.

In his 1909 bibliography of English cookery books, Oxford reported that Robert Watt had dated the first edition of Primitive Cookery to 1766. The second edition, advertised as containing considerable additions, was published in London in 1767 by the bookseller John Williams, whose shop was at 38 Fleet Street. It comprised 80 numbered pages and was priced at one shilling.

The 1767 edition opens with a section titled "Dr. Lobb's Advice to the Poor with regard to Diet", attributed to the physician Theophilus Lobb. The section recommends eating more pulses and vegetables and less animal food to reduce household expenditure, as well as moderating the consumption of alcoholic drinks. Lobb's earlier medical work, The Family Physician; or, The Practice of Physick Made Easy (1763), also published by J. Williams, included advice to the poor concerning diet.

Although Primitive Cookery was published anonymously, historian Rebecca Earle lists the 1767 edition under Lobb's name, in square brackets, in the bibliography to her 2020 study Feeding the People: The Politics of the Potato.

== Content ==
Primitive Cookery contains recipes and household instructions using vegetables, herbs, fruits and other produce from the kitchen garden. Many dishes use eggs, butter, milk or cheese. Although the book largely consists of recipes that would now be considered lacto-ovo vegetarian, it also includes preparations containing meat.

Kevin Carter, writing about historical cookery, interprets the book as an attempt to encourage inexpensive and healthy eating among people unable to afford meat, rather than an expression of ethical opposition to eating animals. He also observes that many of its recipes appear to have been drawn from earlier cookbooks.

The book includes advice on reducing food expenditure by eating more vegetables and pulses in place of meat. Its recipes cover the preparation of vegetables, puddings, soups, preserves and drinks, including instructions for preparing and preserving herbs, fruits and flowers.

A section near the end, titled "A Bill of Fare of Seventy Pretty Little Dishes, Which Will Not Stand in Two-Pence Charge", lists 70 suggested meals. The dishes include preparations of bread, milk, eggs, vegetables and grains. Carter considers the section particularly useful for understanding inexpensive eighteenth-century meals, which were often omitted from cookbooks intended for wealthier households.

The book also contains a recipe for a cheap drink made with water and ground oatmeal.

== Reception ==
Primitive Cookery received criticism from contemporary reviewers, particularly concerning the affordability of its suggested meals.

A review in The Monthly Review questioned the accuracy and usefulness of the recipes, describing some of the material as outdated. The reviewer challenged the assertion that the 70 dishes could be prepared for two pence each, arguing that many would cost considerably more and some as much as three times the advertised amount. According to the review, only a simple preparation of water gruel could reliably be made for the stated cost.

The French Journal encyclopédique also criticised the book's claim to provide 70 dishes costing no more than two pence each. Its reviewer argued that the meals would cost substantially more, estimating that none could be prepared for less than twelve pence per person. The review also questioned the quality of the suggested dishes, while acknowledging the author's intention of helping people with limited means.

== Later assessment ==
Primitive Cookery has been described as an early vegetarian cookbook and has sometimes been identified as the first cookbook devoted to vegetarian dishes, predating Martha Brotherton's Vegetable Cookery (1812). (Note: Unlike Vegetable Cookery, Primitive Cookery includes some recipes containing meat.)

Food historian Sandra Sherman describes the book as primarily vegetarian, while noting that its inclusion of meat prevents it from being classified as entirely vegetarian.

== See also ==
- Bibliography of veganism and vegetarianism
- History of English cuisine
- History of vegetarianism
