= Martha Brotherton =

English cookbook writer (1782–1861)

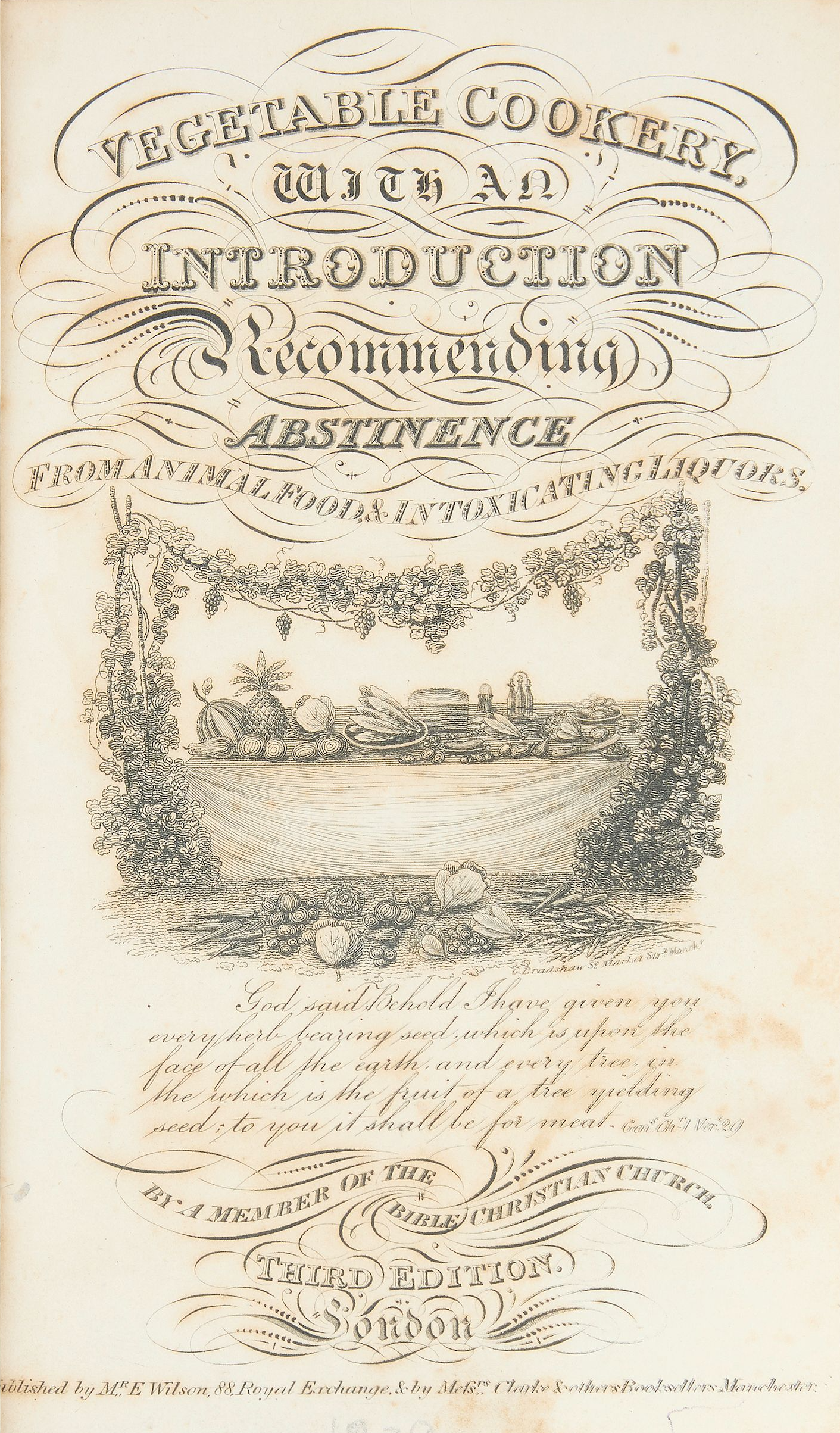
- Third edition title page of Brotherton's Vegetable Cookery
- Born: Martha Harvey; Whittington, Derbyshire, England
- Baptised: 1782
- Died: 25 January 1861 (aged 1783); Pendleton, Salford, England
- Resting place: Weaste Cemetery
- Other name: Martha Harvey Brotherton
- Occupation: Cookbook writer
- Known for: Publishing an early vegetarian cookbook
- Notable work: Vegetable Cookery (1812)
- Spouse: Joseph Brotherton (m. 1805; died 1857)
- Children: 4, including Helen
- Relatives: William Harvey (brother)

Martha Harvey Brotherton (born Martha Harvey; bapt. 1782 – 25 January 1861) was an English cookbook writer. She is best known as the author of Vegetable Cookery (1812), an early vegetarian cookbook associated with the Bible Christian Church in Salford. The book was published anonymously and later issued in several expanded editions. Brotherton attended the first annual meeting of the Vegetarian Society. She was married to Joseph Brotherton, a minister in the Bible Christian Church and Salford's first Member of Parliament.

== Biography ==
=== Early life and family ===
Martha Harvey was baptised in 1782 in Whittington, Derbyshire, the daughter of Joseph Harvey. (Note: Sources vary regarding Brotherton's birth year, listing it as 1781, 1783, or 1784. The Oxford Dictionary of Biography gives the year of her baptism as 1782 and her parents as Joseph and Martha Harvey (née Brotherton). This identification of her mother as Martha is supported by her Weaste Cemetery Heritage Trail biography. However, baptismal records from Whittington, Derbyshire, for the years 1781 to 1784 list only one Martha Harvey, who was baptised on 24 June 1782, with her parents listed as Joseph and Hannah Harvey.) She had several siblings. Her brother, William Harvey, became active in Salford's Bible Christian Church and in reform movements including the Vegetarian Society, temperance, and parliamentary reform. He served as Mayor of Salford in 1857 and 1858.

On 12 March 1805, she married Joseph Brotherton (1783–1857) at Whittington Anglican Church, Derbyshire. The couple initially lived in Manchester before moving to Salford, where her husband inherited his father's cotton mill, became a minister of the Bible Christian Church, and later became Salford's first Member of Parliament. The couple had four children, including Helen.

=== Vegetable Cookery ===
Brotherton was associated with the Bible Christian Church as a minister's wife and as the author of Vegetable Cookery, published in 1812. The book was originally published anonymously and was republished several times during the 19th century.

Laura J. Miller and Emilie Hardman state that Brotherton's book guided some early 19th-century American readers in adopting vegetarianism. Kathryn Gleadle describes the book as central to the early movement and as a basis for later vegetarian cookbooks.

=== Vegetarian Society ===
Brotherton attended the first annual meeting of the Vegetarian Society and other meetings of the society.

=== Death ===
Brotherton died of a heart attack on 25 January 1861 at her home in Pendleton, Salford, aged 78. She was buried alongside her husband at Weaste Cemetery, Salford. A statue was made for her by Matthew Noble.

== See also ==
- Christian vegetarianism
- History of vegetarianism
- Vegetarianism in the United Kingdom
- Vegetarianism in the Victorian era
- Women and vegetarianism and veganism advocacy
- Women in the Victorian era
