= James Clark (Bible Christian) =

English minister and activist (1830–1905)

The Reverend James Clark
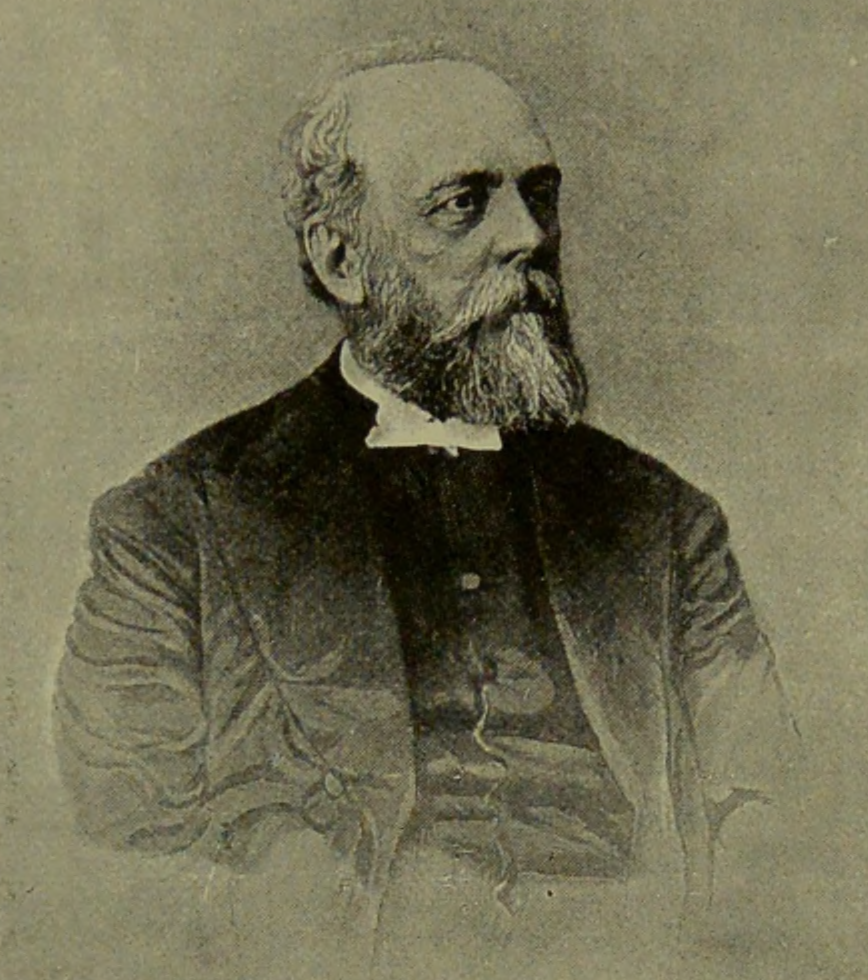
- Clark in Fifty Years of Food Reform (1898)
- Born: 18 October 1830; Bolton, Lancashire, England
- Died: 7 June 1905 (aged 74); Salford, Lancashire, England
- Resting place: Weaste Cemetery
- Occupations: Minister; social reformer
- Years active: 1857–1905
- Known for: Vegetarianism activism
- Spouse: Cordelia Collier (m. 1854; died 1893)
- Children: 7
- Relatives: Edwin Collier (brother-in-law)

James Clark (18 October 1830 – 7 June 1905) was an English Bible Christian minister and social reformer. He was based in Salford, where he served as pastor of the denomination for nearly 50 years. He was also involved in local education and poor-law administration, including service on the Salford School Board and the Salford Board of Guardians.

Clark became a teetotaller in 1848 and a vegetarian in 1851. He worked with temperance organisations in Manchester and held positions in the United Kingdom Alliance, the Manchester and Salford Temperance Union, and the Lancashire and Cheshire Band of Hope Union. He was honorary secretary of the Vegetarian Society, chaired its annual meeting in 1902, and represented it at international congresses. He was later credited with helping to establish the International Vegetarian Union.

== Biography ==
=== Early life and career ===
James Clark was born on 18 October 1830 in Bolton, Lancashire. He was baptised in Bolton le Moors on 2 January 1831. Clark's family had a history of tuberculosis.

Clark moved to Manchester as a youth and began work in a shipping house, where he later became a buyer. He also attended evening classes associated with the Bible Christian Church in King Street, Salford.

=== Ministry and social reform ===
In 1848, Clark became a teetotaller and worked for the Manchester Temperance Society. He adopted vegetarianism in 1851. He was ordained as a minister of the Bible Christian Church and became its pastor at Whitsuntide in 1858. The denomination, founded in 1809, required abstinence from intoxicants and meat.

One of Clark's predecessors in the ministry was Joseph Brotherton, Salford's Member of Parliament. Clark remained pastor for nearly 50 years and continued his church duties in later life despite failing health.

Clark took part in relief work during the Cotton Famine and served on relief committees in Salford. After the Broughton floods of 1866, he worked to assist those affected. He was also a long-serving member of the Salford Board of Guardians. When he resigned as chair in 1889, he received an address signed by every member of the board.

A Liberal and supporter of education, Clark taught at the Salford Lyceum and served two terms on the Salford School Board. He oversaw Sunday and day schools within the Bible Christian Church. He also supported the Band of Hope and held senior roles in the United Kingdom Alliance, the Manchester and Salford Temperance Union, and the Lancashire and Cheshire Band of Hope Union.

=== Vegetarian movement ===
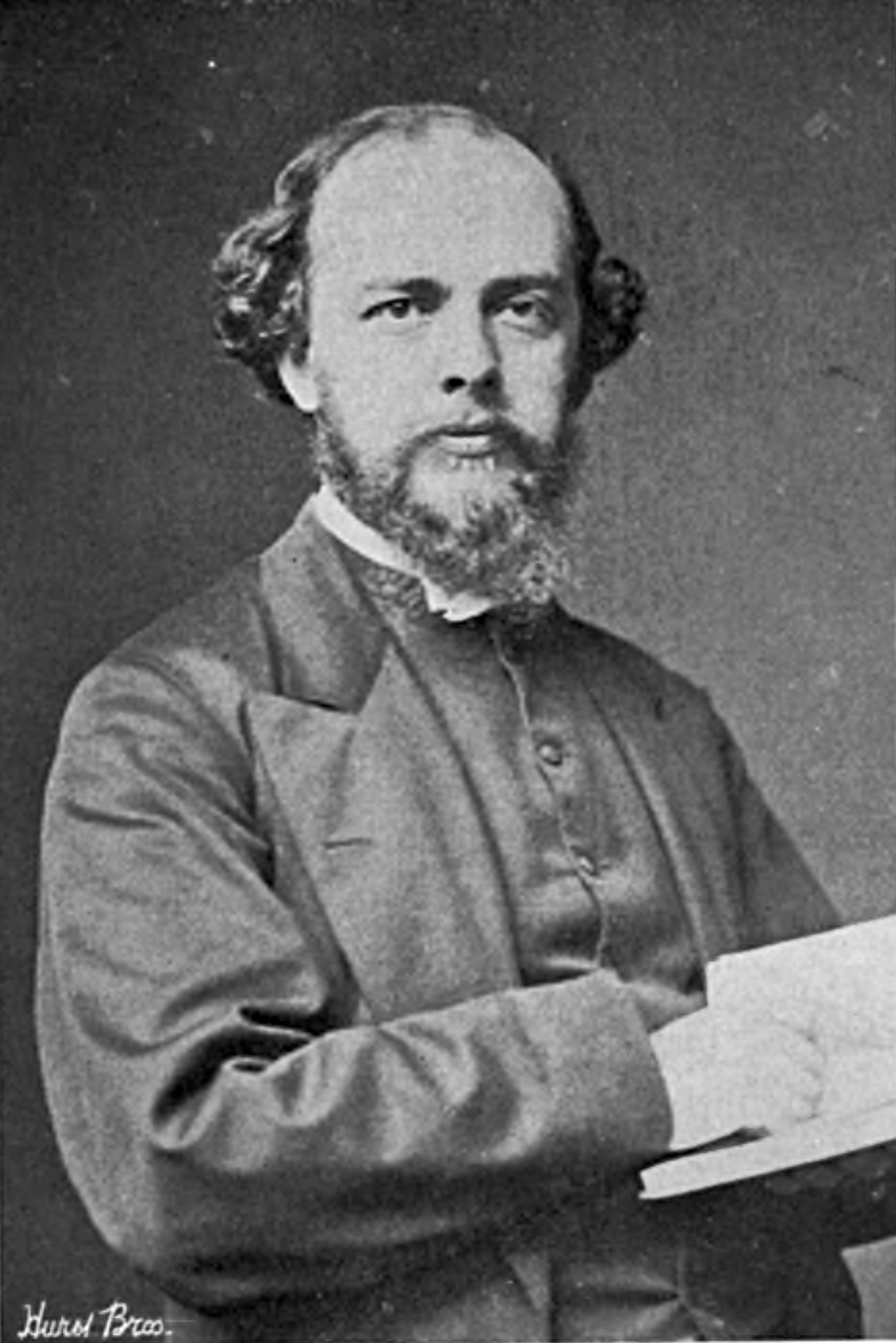
Clark, c. 1870

Clark served for many years as honorary secretary of the Vegetarian Society. In 1902, he chaired the society's annual meeting. He represented the society at international congresses, including those in Chicago in 1893, St Louis in 1903, Paris, and Cologne. He attended the May 1905 meeting of the Vegetarian Society in Cambridge, a month before his death. Clark was also later credited with helping to establish the International Vegetarian Union.

=== Personal life and death ===
Clark married Cordelia Collier in 1854. Her brother Edwin served as a deacon of the Bible Christian Church and was vice-president and treasurer of the Vegetarian Society. James and Cordelia Clark had seven children: Ernest, Bertha, Maud, Harold, Ethel, Arthur, and Alfred. Arthur was also active in the vegetarian movement. Cordelia suffered a seizure in 1889 and died in 1893 at the age of 69. She was buried in Weaste Cemetery, Salford.

Clark died at his home in Salford on 7 June 1905, aged 74, following a paralytic stroke. He was buried in Weaste Cemetery on 10 June.

== Legacy ==
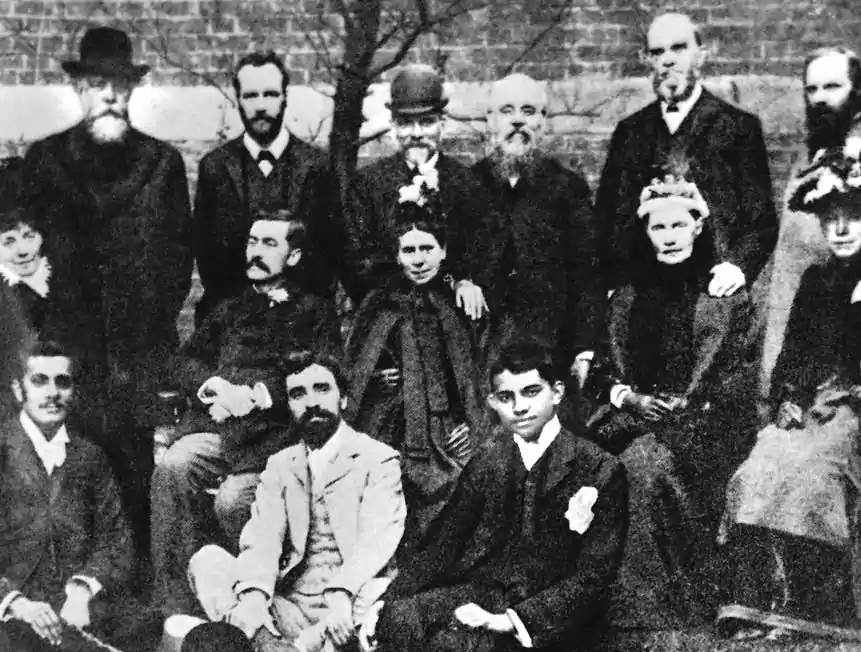
1891 meeting of the London Vegetarian Society; Clark at top left

A memorial service for Clarke was attended by representatives of several organisations, including the Vegetarian Society. Contemporary tributes referred to his work with the poor and his support for the Bible Christian Church, temperance, and vegetarianism. Two memorials were erected in his memory. Later accounts credited him with work for the Vegetarian Society during a period of difficulty for the organisation.

== Publications ==
- Abstinence From Flesh: A Scriptural Doctrine and a Religious Duty. London: Frederick Pitman. 1877.
- Bible Testimony and the Use of Animal Food. Manchester: Vegetarian Society. c. 1910.
- Scriptural Phase of Vegetarianism. Manchester: Vegetarian Society. c. 1910.
- Testimony of Scripture. Manchester: Vegetarian Society. c. 1910s.

== See also ==
- Christian vegetarianism
- History of vegetarianism
- Vegetarianism in the Victorian era
- Vegetarianism in the United Kingdom
- Temperance movement in the United Kingdom
