= 1844 Salford Borough Council election =

Local election in Salford

- 12 July 1844

24 of 32 seats to Salford Borough Council 17 seats needed for a majority
	First party	Second party	Third party
Party	Liberal	Conservative	Independent Liberal
Alliance	Liberal slate	Independent slate	Independent slate
Seats won	17	6	1
Seats after	25	6	1
Popular vote	3,173	1,733	366
Percentage	56.1%	30.6%	6.5%
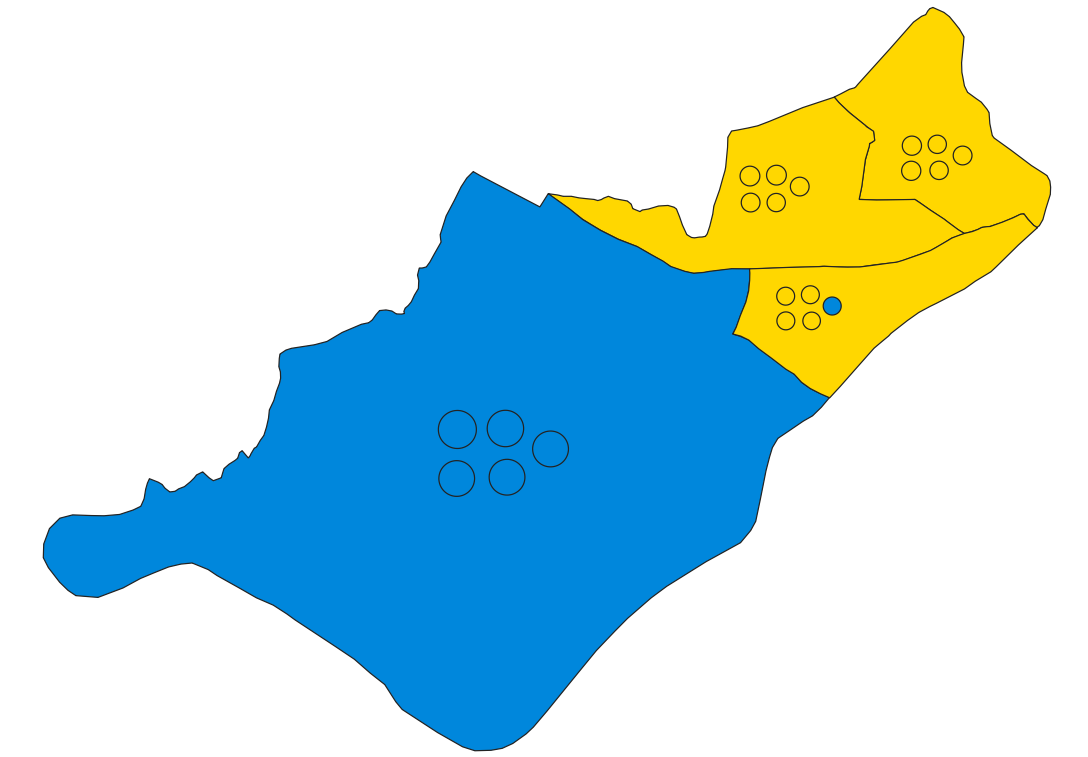
- Map of results of 1844 election
Leader of the Council after election
Liberal

Elections to Salford Borough Council were held on Friday, 12 July 1844.

This was the first local election held in Salford since it had been incorporated under the provisions of the Municipal Corporations Act 1835. As this was the first election to the council, all seats for each of the four wards were up for election. Each ward elected six councillors. The candidates in each ward with the highest and second-highest numbers of votes were elected for three years. The candidates with the third and fourth-highest number of votes were elected for two years, and the candidates with the fifth and sixth-highest numbers of votes were elected for one year.

A slate consisting of Liberals who supported the town's previous administration under William Lockett was formed to contest the election. Another slate comprising Conservatives as well as some Chartists and Independent Liberals was then formed in opposition to the "Lockett Party".

The Liberal slate gained overall control of the council.

== Election result ==
Party	Votes	Seats		Full Council	
Liberal slate
Liberal Party	3,173 (56.1%)	17 (70.8%)	17 / 24	25 (78.1%)	25 / 32
Liberal slate	3,173 (56.1%)	17 (70.8%)	17 / 24	25 (78.1%)	25 / 32
Independent slate
Conservative Party	1,733 (30.6%)	6 (25.0%)	6 / 24	6 (18.8%)	6 / 32
Independent Liberal	366 (6.5%)	1 (4.2%)	1 / 24	1 (3.1%)	1 / 32
Chartist	387 (6.8%)	0 (0.0%)	0 / 24	0 (0.0%)	0 / 32
Independent slate	2,486 (43.9%)	7 (29.2%)	7 / 24	7 (21.9%)	7 / 32

=== Full council ===
↓
25	7

=== Aldermen ===
↓
8

=== Councillors ===
↓
17	7

== Ward results ==
=== Blackfriars ===
Blackfriars
Party	Candidate	Votes	%	±%
Liberal	John Dracup	102	53.4	
Liberal	William Morris	100	52.4	
Liberal	R. P. Livingstone	99	51.8	
Liberal	James Higgins	97	50.8	
Liberal	Robert McIntyre	97	50.8	
Conservative	William Lomas	96	50.3	
Chartist	Peter Gendall	93	48.7	
Conservative	Benjamin Joule	92	48.2	
Chartist	William Hall	91	47.6	
Conservative	William Jenkinson	91	47.6	
Liberal	Jon Thompson	90	47.1	
Independent Liberal	William Morris	88	46.1	
Majority		3	1.6	
Turnout		191	77.0	
Liberal win (new seat)				
Liberal win (new seat)				
Liberal win (new seat)				
Liberal win (new seat)				
Liberal win (new seat)				
Conservative win (new seat)				

=== Crescent ===
Crescent
Party	Candidate	Votes	%	±%
Independent Liberal	Adam Howe	120	54.1	
Conservative	William Wanklyn	120	54.1	
Conservative	Jerry Lees	119	53.6	
Conservative	James Worrall	119	53.6	
Conservative	Philip Bateman	117	52.7	
Conservative	Charles Cox	115	51.8	
Liberal	James Hall	104	46.8	
Liberal	John Kay	103	46.3	
Liberal	Lawrence Rostron	103	46.4	
Liberal	Cornelius Nichols	102	45.9	
Liberal	Thomas Chadwick	101	45.5	
Liberal	William Harvey	100	45.0	
Majority		11	5.0	
Turnout		222	78.4	
Independent Liberal win (new seat)				
Conservative win (new seat)				
Conservative win (new seat)				
Conservative win (new seat)				
Conservative win (new seat)				
Conservative win (new seat)				

=== St. Stephen's ===
St. Stephen's
Party	Candidate	Votes	%	±%
Liberal	John Leeming	161	63.6	
Liberal	Thomas Bury	160	63.2	
Liberal	Thomas Eames	158	62.5	
Liberal	H. C. Renshaw	157	62.1	
Liberal	Abraham Holmes	156	61.7	
Liberal	Thomas Agnew	153	60.5	
Conservative	John Gardom	96	37.9	
Conservative	William Harrison	96	37.9	
Chartist	Thomas Galley	95	37.5	
Conservative	Henry Sagar	95	37.5	
Conservative	Thomas Underwood	94	37.2	
Independent Liberal	John Leeming	92	36.4	
Majority		57	22.6	
Turnout		253	74.2	
Liberal win (new seat)				
Liberal win (new seat)				
Liberal win (new seat)				
Liberal win (new seat)				
Liberal win (new seat)				
Liberal win (new seat)				

=== Trinity ===
Trinity
Party	Candidate	Votes	%	±%
Liberal	John Harding	178	62.9	
Liberal	George Langworthy	176	62.2	
Liberal	Daniel Lee	175	61.8	
Liberal	William Collier	172	60.8	
Liberal	Richard Woodward	172	60.8	
Liberal	George Campbell	157	55.5	
Conservative	Huitson Dearman	125	44.2	
Chartist	J. W. Hodgetts	111	35.7	
Conservative	Thomas Southern	108	38.2	
Conservative	J. S. Williamson	105	37.1	
Conservative	Richard Eaton	103	36.4	
Independent Liberal	William Collier	66	23.3	
Majority		32	11.3	
Turnout		283	73.1	
Liberal win (new seat)				
Liberal win (new seat)				
Liberal win (new seat)				
Liberal win (new seat)				
Liberal win (new seat)				
Liberal win (new seat)				

== Aldermanic elections ==
=== Aldermanic election, 20 July 1844 ===
Aldermanic elections took place during the council's first meeting on 20 July 1844, all Aldermanic seats were up for election.

Party	Alderman	Votes	Term	Ward
Liberal Party	James Hall	16	1849	Blackfriars
Liberal Party	William Harvey	16	1849	St. Stephen's
Liberal Party	Eaton Hodgkinson	16	1846	St. Stephen's
Liberal Party	John Kay	16	1846	Crescent
Liberal Party	Edward Ryley Langworthy	16	1849	Trinity
Liberal Party	William Lockett	16	1849	Crescent
Liberal Party	Lawrence Rostron	16	1846	Blackfriars
Liberal Party	George Wood	16	1846	Trinity
Conservative Party	Huitson Dearman	7	N/A	N/A
Conservative Party	Lot Gardinger	7	N/A	N/A
Independent Liberal	Daniel Lee	7	N/A	N/A
Independent Liberal	John Leeming	7	N/A	N/A
Conservative Party	Jerry Lees	7	N/A	N/A
Conservative Party	William Lomas	7	N/A	N/A
Conservative Party	Sibson Rigg	7	N/A	N/A
Conservative Party	William Wanklyn	7	N/A	N/A

=== Aldermanic election, 31 July 1844 ===
Caused by the resignation on 31 July 1844 of Alderman George Wood (Liberal Party, elected as an alderman by the council on 20 July 1844).

In his place, Charles Tysoe (Liberal, not a councillor) was elected as an alderman by the council on 31 July 1844.

Party	Alderman	Votes	Term	Ward
Liberal Party	Charles Tysoe	17	1846	Trinity
Conservative Party	Huitson Dearman	11	N/A	N/A
