= William Norman (VC) =

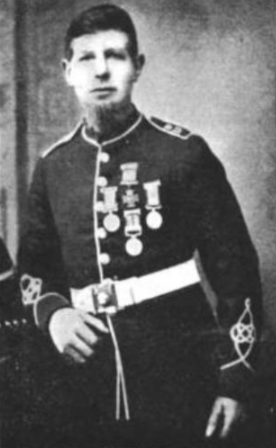
- Born: 1832; Warrington, Lancashire, England
- Died: 13 March 1896 (aged 63–64); Salford, Lancashire, England
- Burial place: Weaste Cemetery, Salford
- Military career
- Allegiance: United Kingdom
- Branch: British Army
- Service years: 1853–1865
- Rank: Corporal
- Units: 7th Regiment of Foot
- Conflicts: Crimean War; Umbeyla Campaign
- Awards: Victoria Cross

William Norman VC (1832 – 13 March 1896) was an English recipient of the Victoria Cross, the highest and most prestigious award for gallantry in the face of the enemy that can be awarded to British and Commonwealth forces.

He was born in Warrington, Lancashire and enlisted as a private in the 7th Regiment of Foot (later the Royal Fusiliers) of the British Army on 15 May 1854. During the Crimean War the following deed took place for which he was awarded the VC. On 19 December 1854 at Sebastopol, in the Crimea, Private Norman was placed on single sentry duty some distance in front of the advanced sentries of an outlying picquet in the White Horse Ravine, a post of much danger and requiring great vigilance. The Russian picquet was posted about 300 yards in front of him, and three Russians came reconnoitring under cover of the brushwood. Private Norman single-handedly took two of them prisoner without alarming the Russian picquet. He was decorated by Queen Victoria in Hyde Park on 26 June 1857.

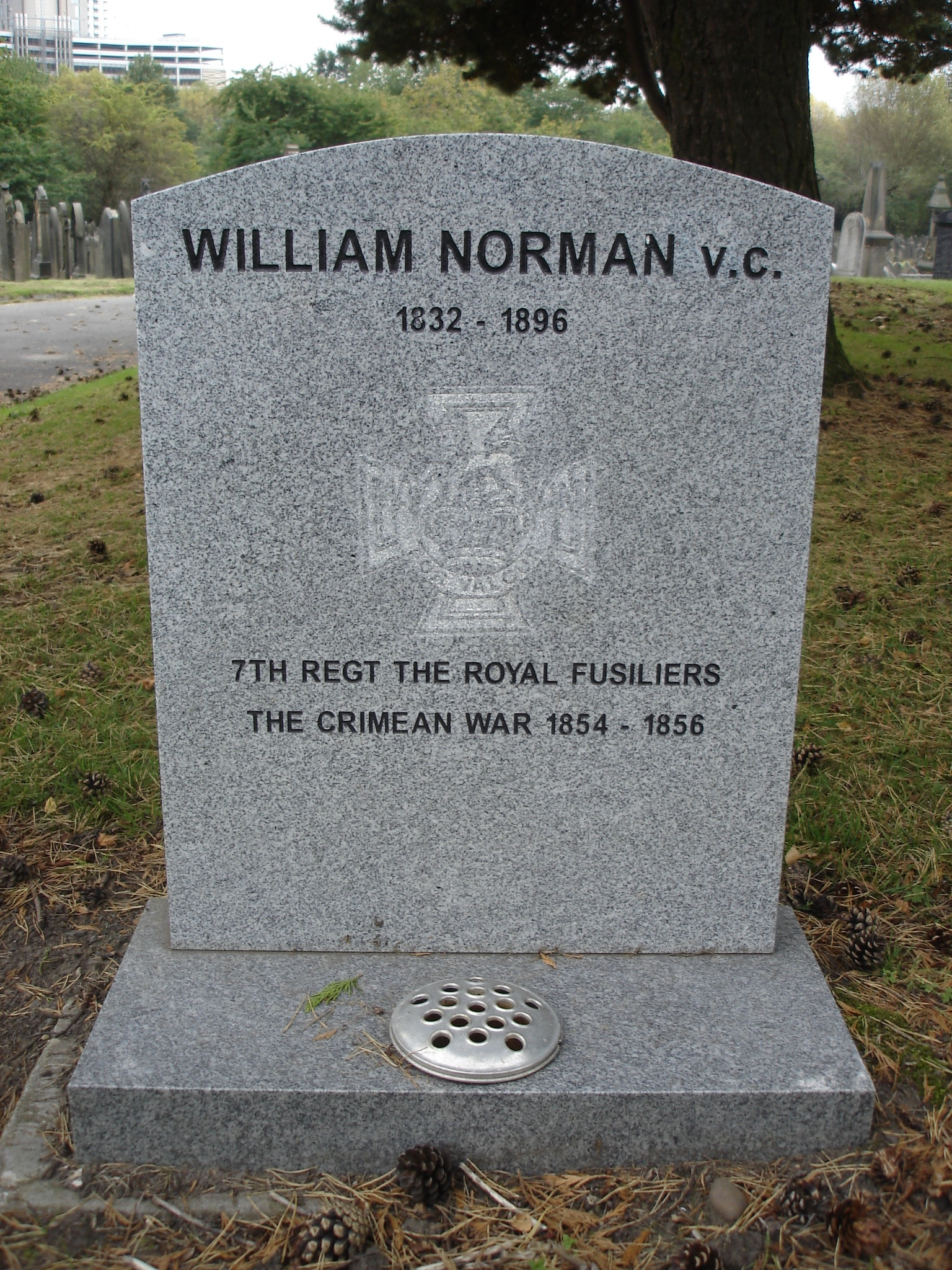
Norman's grave at Weaste Cemetery

He later served in the Umbeyla Campaign on the North-West Frontier in 1863 and achieved the rank of corporal. He left the Army in 1865.

He died on 13 March 1896 in Salford, Lancashire and is buried in a common grave at Weaste Cemetery, Salford. He was married with three children. His Victoria Cross and other medals are displayed at the Royal Fusiliers Museum in the Tower of London, England.
