= Vegetable Cookery =

1812 cookbook by Martha Brotherton

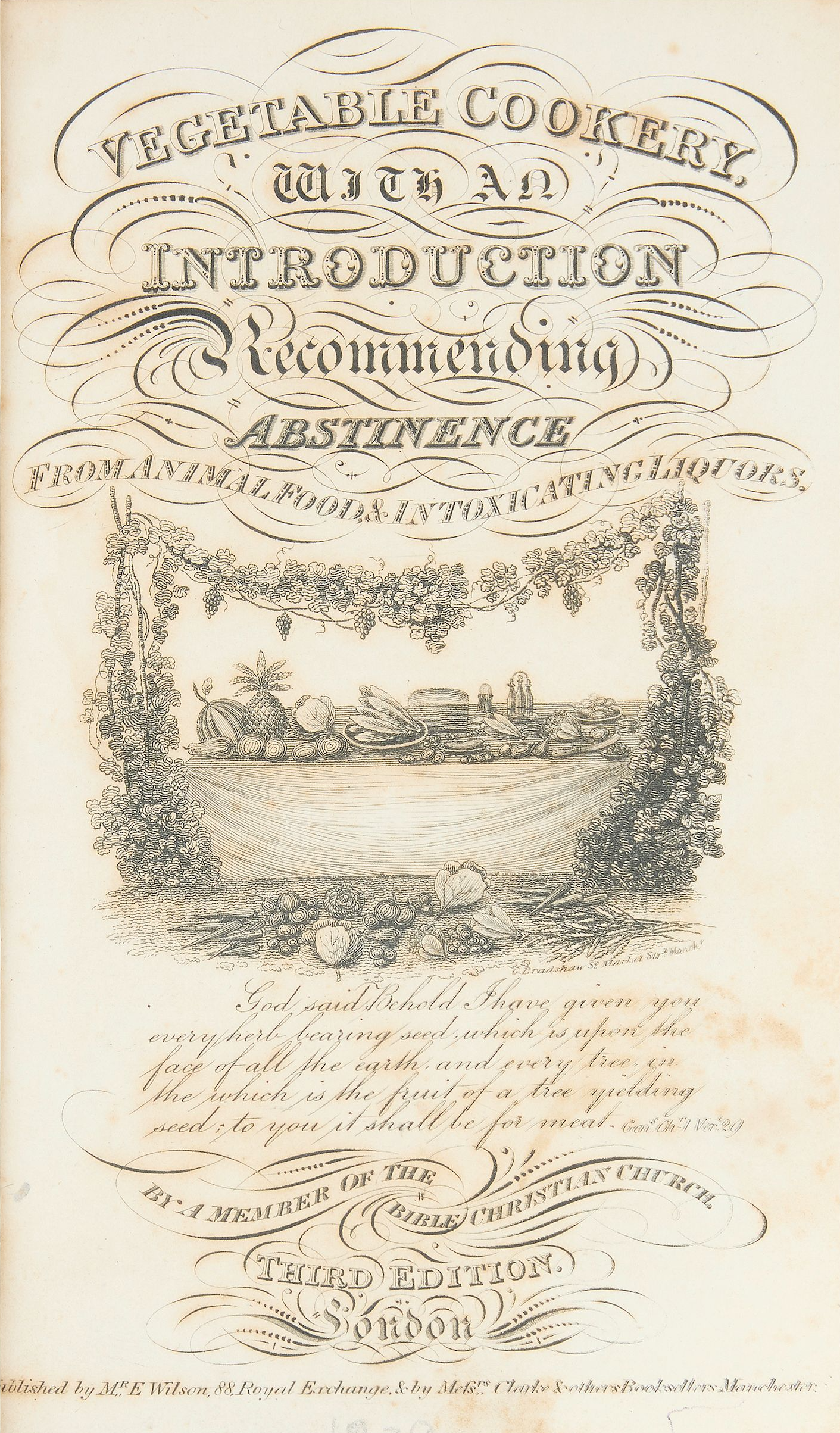
- Third edition title page (1829)
- Author: Martha Brotherton
- Original title: A New System of Vegetable Cookery
- Language: English
- Subject: Vegetarian cuisine
- Genre: Cookbook
- Publication date: 1812
- Publication place: United Kingdom of Great Britain and Ireland
- Media type: Print
- Text: Vegetable Cookery at the Internet Archive (2nd edition)

Vegetable Cookery (first published in 1812 as A New System of Vegetable Cookery) is a vegetarian cookbook by Martha Brotherton of Salford. It was first published anonymously and later issued in expanded editions. Brotherton and her husband, Joseph Brotherton, were members of the Bible Christian Church, a religious group that promoted vegetarianism and abstinence from alcohol. Joseph Brotherton wrote the introduction.

The book gives lacto-ovo vegetarian recipes and was used by members of the Bible Christian Church. Later writers have referred to it as the first vegetarian cookbook and have discussed its place in nineteenth-century vegetarian cookery.

== Background ==
Martha Brotherton (née Harvey) was a member of the Bible Christian Church in Salford, a sect that promoted vegetarianism and abstinence from alcohol. In 1805, she married Joseph Brotherton, a fellow church member who later became the church's minister and Salford's first Member of Parliament.

== Publication history ==
Brotherton compiled and published A New System of Vegetable Cookery in periodical form in 1812. It was attributed to "a member of the Bible Christian Church". Joseph Brotherton contributed the introduction.

A second edition appeared in 1821, followed by a third edition published by Horatio Phillips of London in 1829 under the title Vegetable Cookery. The fourth edition was issued in 1833 by Effingham Wilson. It contained 1,261 recipes and was published anonymously, credited only to "a lady". Further editions appeared in 1839 and 1852. The 1852 edition has a foreword by James Simpson, the first president of the Vegetarian Society.

== Contents ==
The fourth edition is divided into more than twenty sections. It opens with an introduction recommending abstinence from animal food and intoxicating liquors, following the principles of the Bible Christian Church.

The main body of the book gives recipes for soups, omelettes, eggs, vegetables, salads, sauces, savoury pies and puddings, cheese dishes, sweet puddings, pancakes, tarts, custards, flummery, bread, biscuits, cakes, preserved fruits, pickles, and syrups. It also has sections on spoon-meats, lemonade and sherbets, household advice, and an appendix.

The recipes are mainly lacto-ovo vegetarian and often use butter, eggs, and cream. They include meat-free and alcohol-free versions of English dishes, as well as recipes using vegetables such as cucumbers, turnips, mushrooms, red cabbage, and artichokes.

== Reception and later assessment ==
Several writers have identified Vegetable Cookery as the first vegetarian cookbook. Laura J. Miller and Emilie Hardman write that the book "served as a guide for Americans who began to self-identify as vegetarian in the early decades of the nineteenth century".

Kathryn Gleadle described the book as "enormously important to the movement, forming the basis of most subsequent works on vegetable cookery".

== See also ==
- Bibliography of veganism and vegetarianism
- History of vegetarianism
- History of English cuisine
- Primitive Cookery – 1767 semi-vegetarian cookbook
