= Weaste Cemetery =

Cemetery in Salford

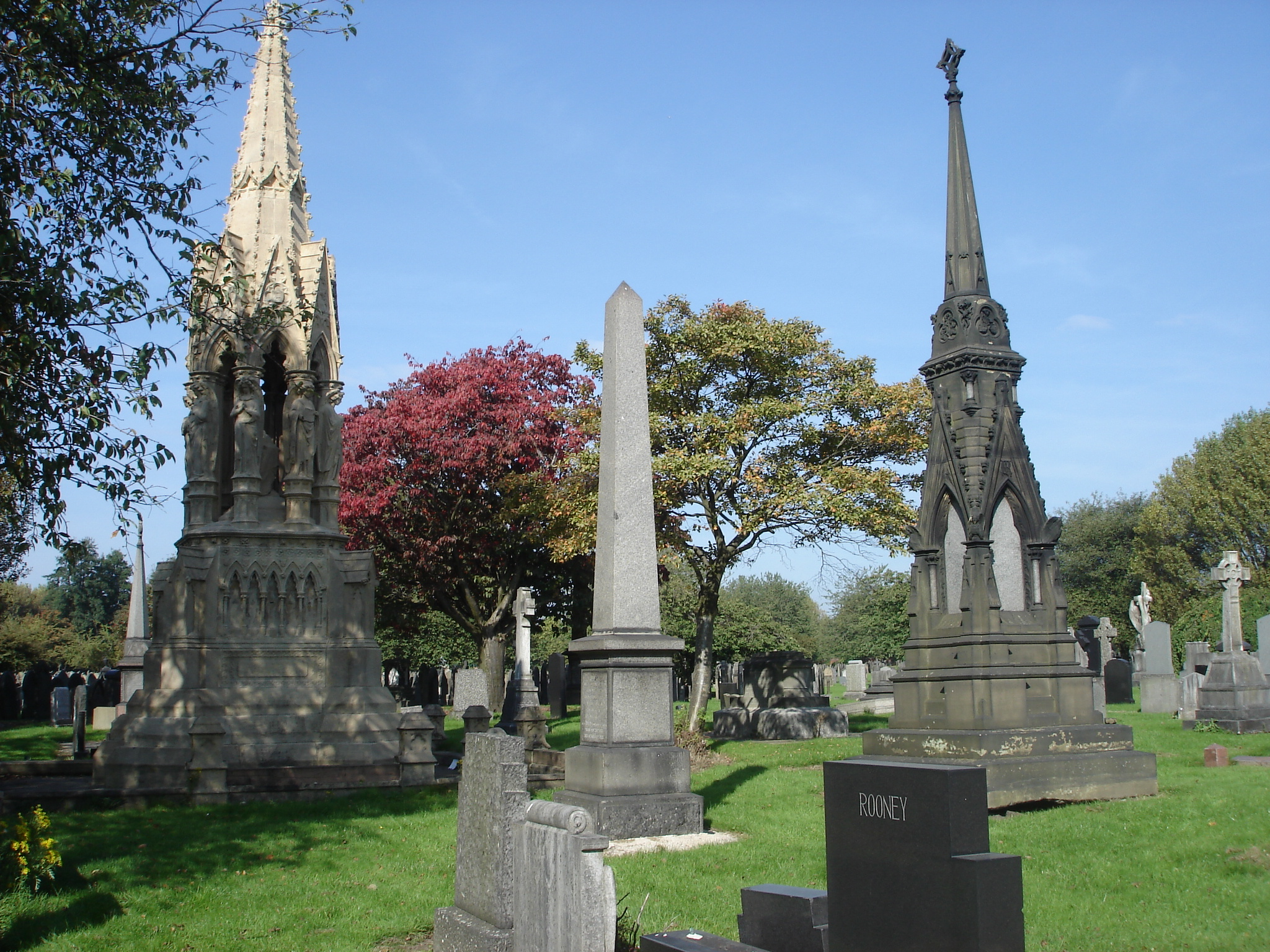
- Weaste Cemetery monuments, 2013

Details
- Established: 1 September 1857; 168 years ago
- Location: Cemetery Road, Salford, M5 5NR
- Country: England
- Coordinates: 53°28′37″N 2°18′11″W
- Type: Public
- Style: Victorian
- Owned by: Salford City Council
- Size: 39 acres (16 ha)
- No. of graves: 332,000+
- Website: Official website
- Find a Grave: Weaste Cemetery

Weaste Cemetery, previously known as Salford Borough Cemetery, is a public Grade II listed Victorian cemetery in Weaste, Salford. Opened in 1857, it is the oldest of Salford's four cemeteries, covering 39 acres (16 ha) and containing over 332,000 graves. It was established due to the overcrowding of churchyards, officially opening on 1 September 1857, with its first interment being Joseph Brotherton on 14 January 1857. The cemetery, which was bombed during the 1940 Manchester Blitz, now features a heritage trail and guided tours, with several Grade II listed monuments. It also holds graves of 373 Commonwealth service personnel from both World Wars, with special memorials and listings for those buried abroad and in unmarked graves.

== Location ==
The cemetery is located in Weaste, Salford, and lies south of Eccles New Road (A57 road). It is approached via Cemetery Road.

== History ==
Salford was among the first British local authorities to recognise the overcrowding of churchyards and the need for alternative burial grounds. When originally opened, the cemetery included four chapels and a glazed summer house, which have since all been demolished.

The first interment was that of the popular member of parliament, Joseph Brotherton, who had campaigned for the cemetery and died just before its completion. Brotherton died on 7 January 1857 and his funeral took place a week later, on 14 January. The cemetery was formally opened on 1 September 1857.

Then known as Salford Borough Cemetery, the site was extended by 16 acres (6.5 ha) in 1887, by which time there had been 124,500 burials. The original 21 acres (8.5 ha) site was becoming full and a 2.5 acres (1.0 ha) area bought earlier with the intention of being used as an addition had been compulsorily purchased for development of the Manchester Ship Canal. At that time, the cemetery was making a profit of around £2,500 (equivalent to £351,149 in 2023) per annum.

During the 1940 Manchester Blitz, a German bomb fell on the cemetery in an air raid targeting the nearby docks. Several headstones still bear marks and holes from the shrapnel.

In 2004, a heritage trail was opened through the efforts of Salford City Council, the Friends of the Cemeteries and the Greater Manchester Ecology Unit. Occasional guided tours of the cemetery also take place. Several of the monuments in the cemetery are Grade II listed.

== Notable interments ==
=== Members of the Bible Christian Church ===
- Joseph Brotherton (1783–1857), first member of parliament for Salford
- Martha Brotherton (bapt. 1782–1861), wife of above and author of first vegetarian cookbook
- Helen Brotherton (1812–1898), daughter of Joseph and Martha, vegetarianism activist and philanthropist
- William Harvey (1787–1870), cotton mill owner, deacon and activist
- James Gaskill (1800–1870), cotton spinner, minister and activist
- Peter Foxcroft (1819–1896), manager, inventor, preacher and activist
- Edwin Collier (1827–1899), accountant, deacon and activist
- James Clark (1830–1905), minister and activist

=== Others ===
- Elkanah Armitage (1794–1876), Lord Mayor of Manchester
- Henry Lee (1817–1904), member of Parliament for Southampton
- Charles Hallé (1819–1895), founder of Hallé Orchestra
- Mark Addy (1838–1890), awarded Albert Medal for saving over 50 people from drowning in the Irwell
- William Norman (1832–1896), awarded Victoria Cross for courage in the Crimea War
- Randall Williams (1846–1898), Victorian showman
- Edward Hardy (1884–1960), member of parliament for Salford South
- William Johnson Galloway (1868–1931), member of parliament for Manchester South West
- Four survivors of the Charge of the Light Brigade
- Eddie Colman (1936–1958), Manchester United player killed in Munich air disaster
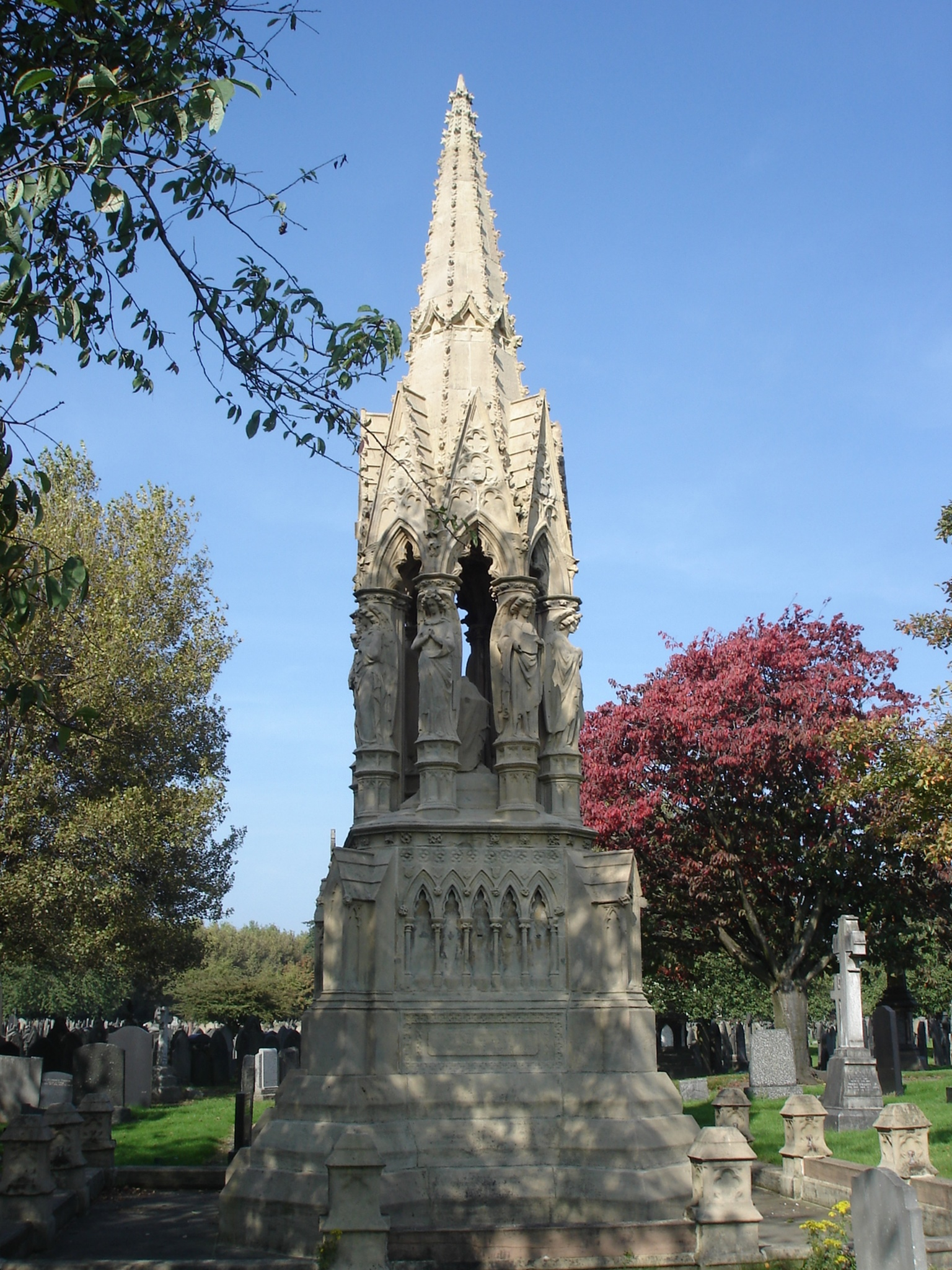
Joseph Brotherton monument

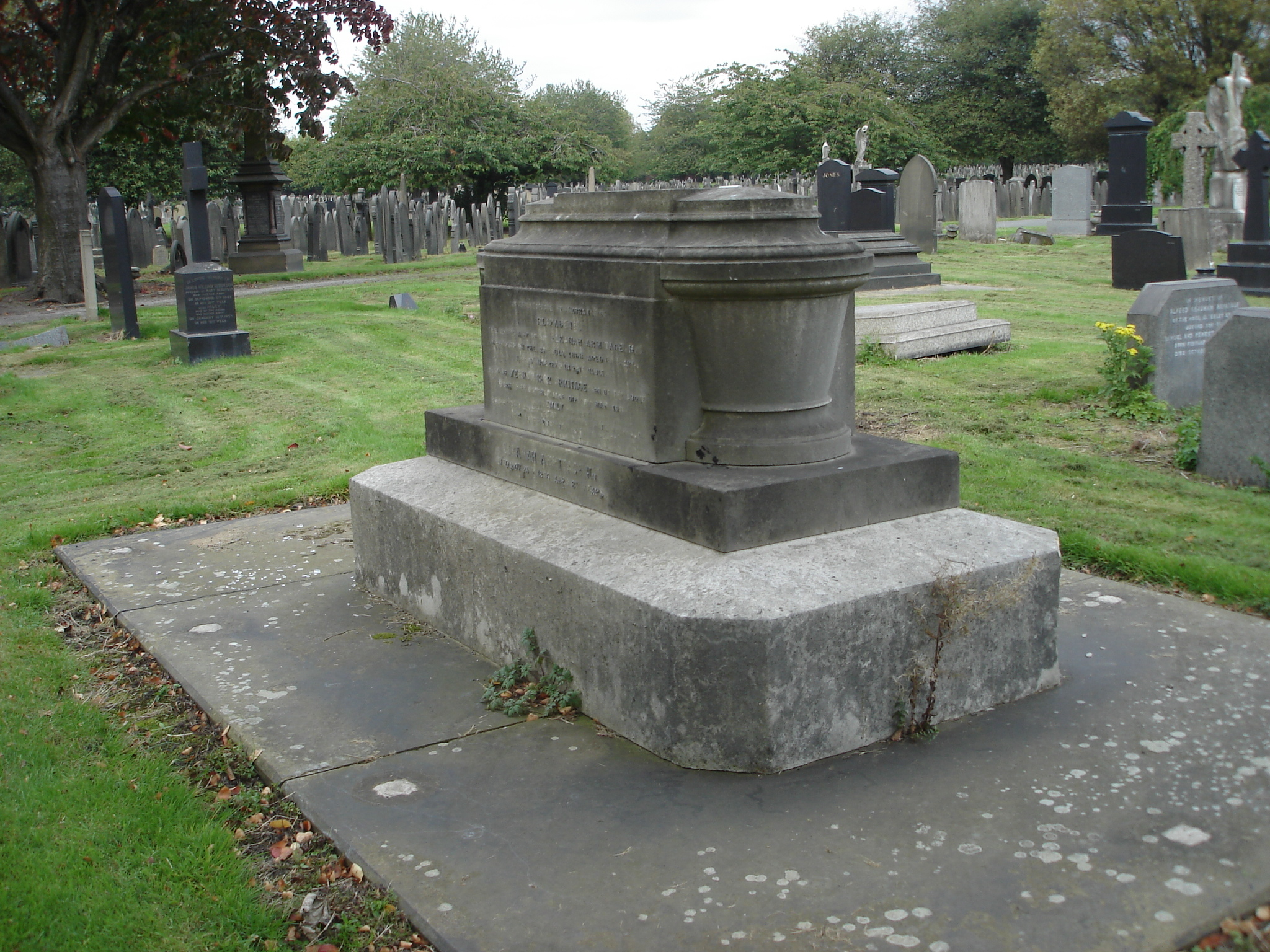
Tomb of Elkanah Armitage

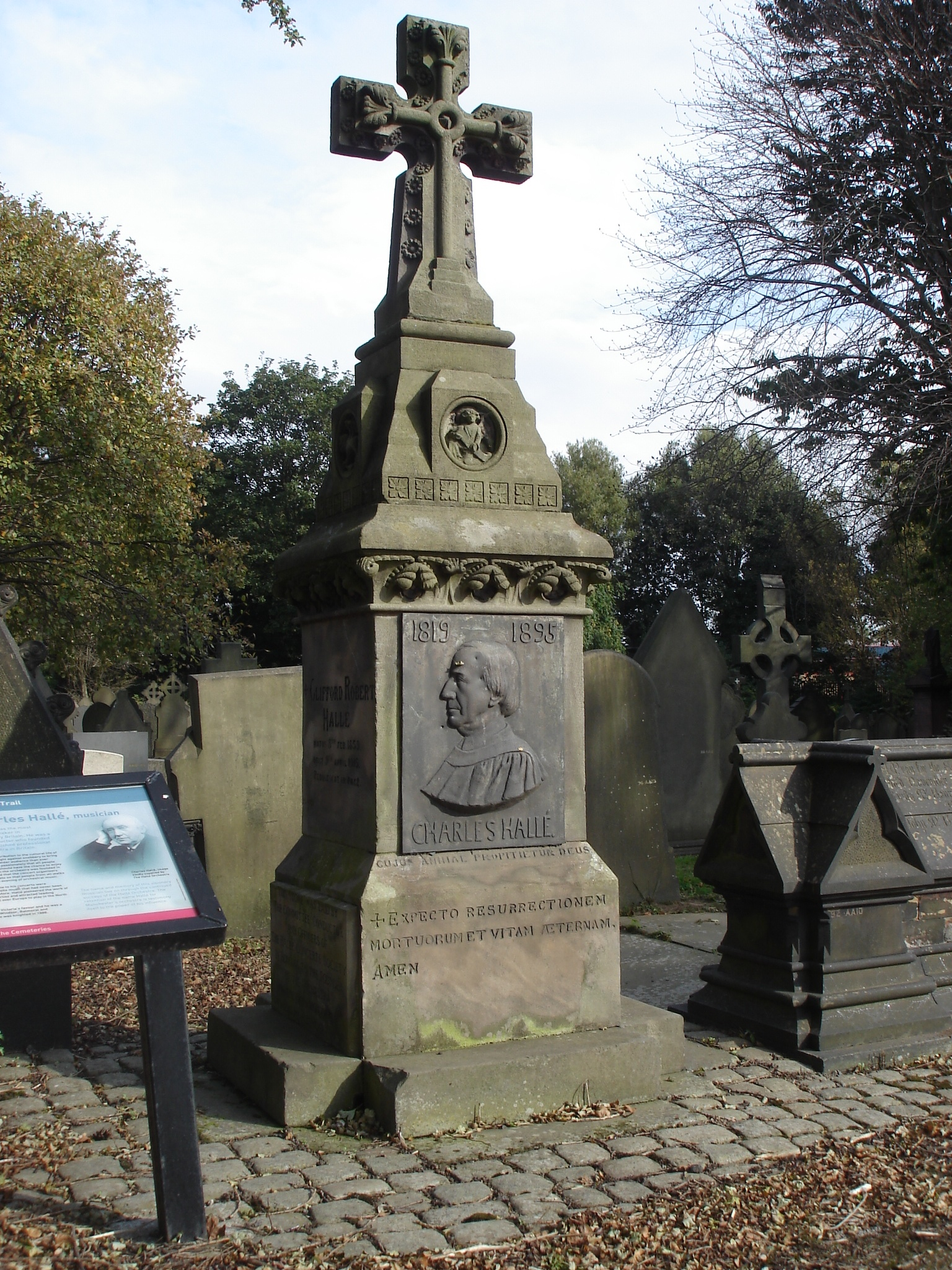
Sir Charles Hallé monument

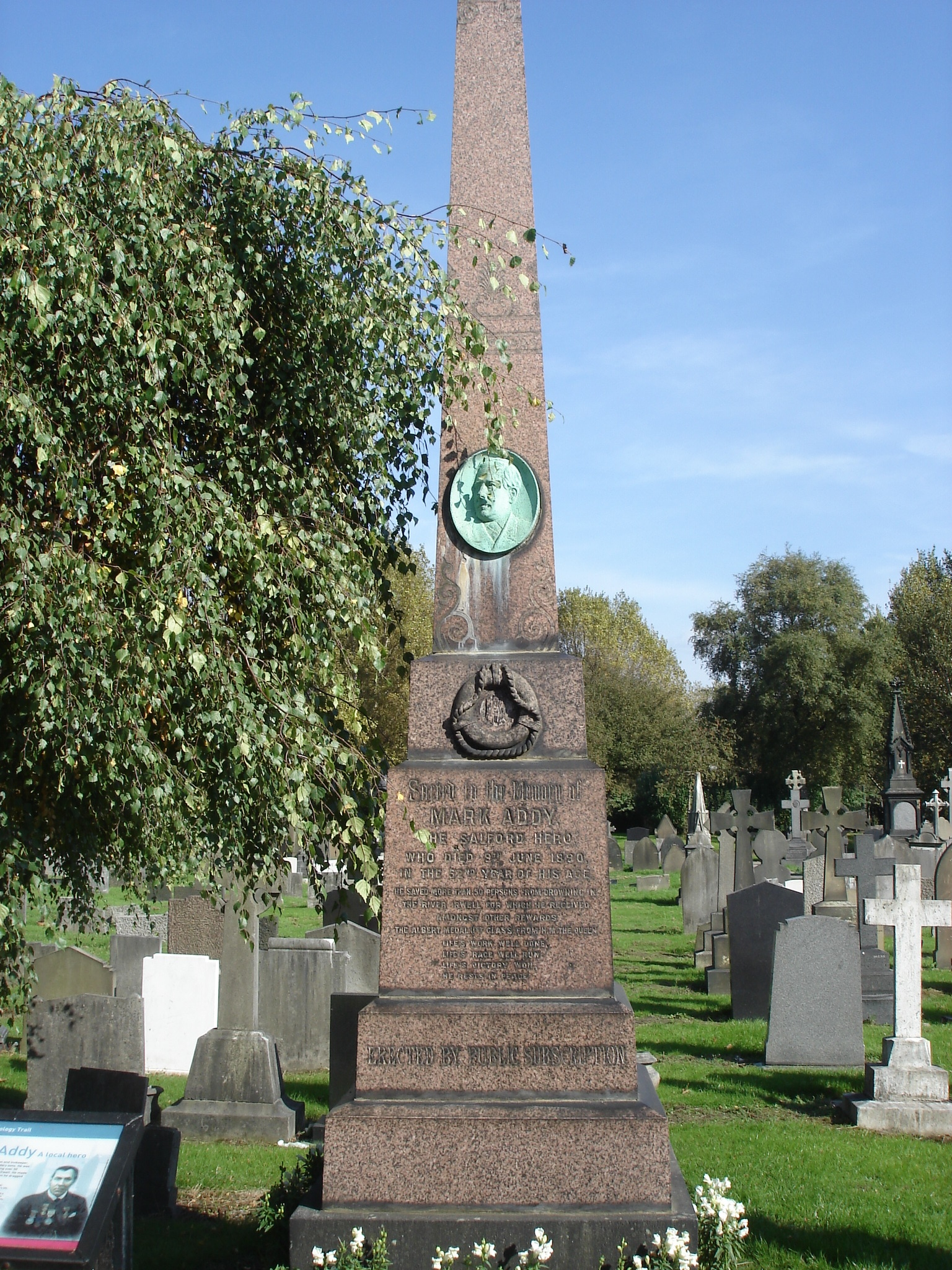
Mark Addy monument

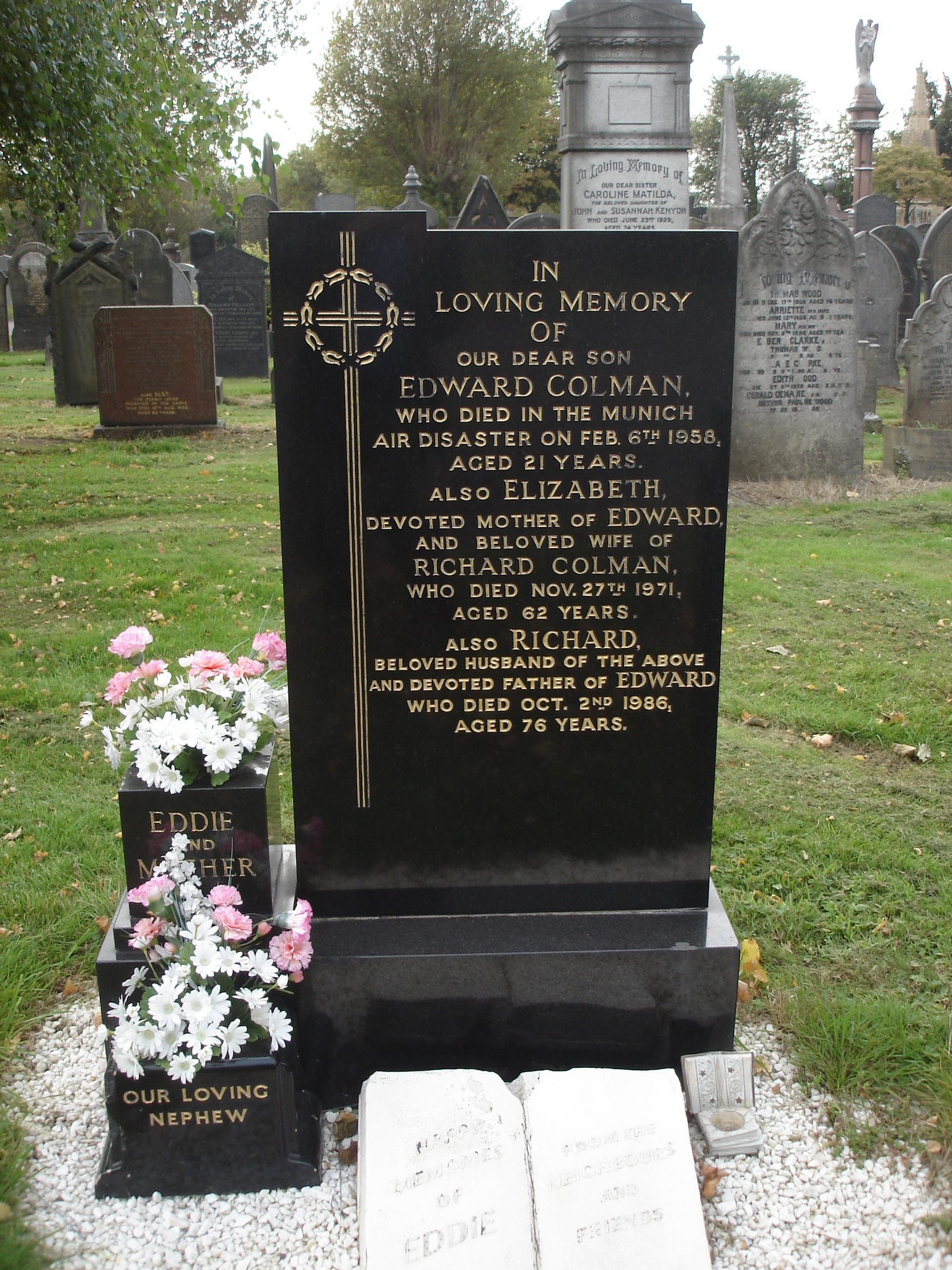
Grave of Eddie Colman

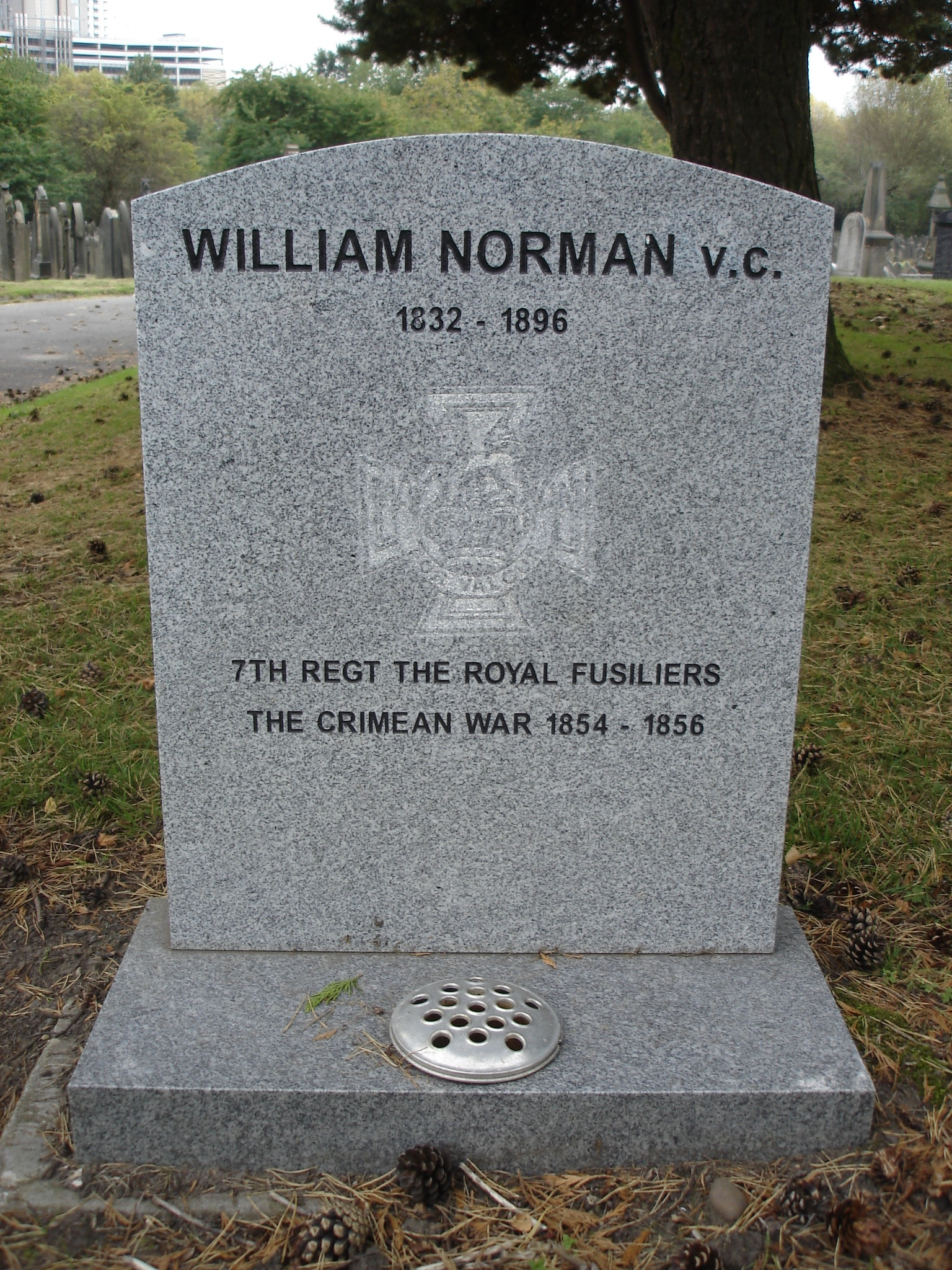
Grave of William Norman, VC

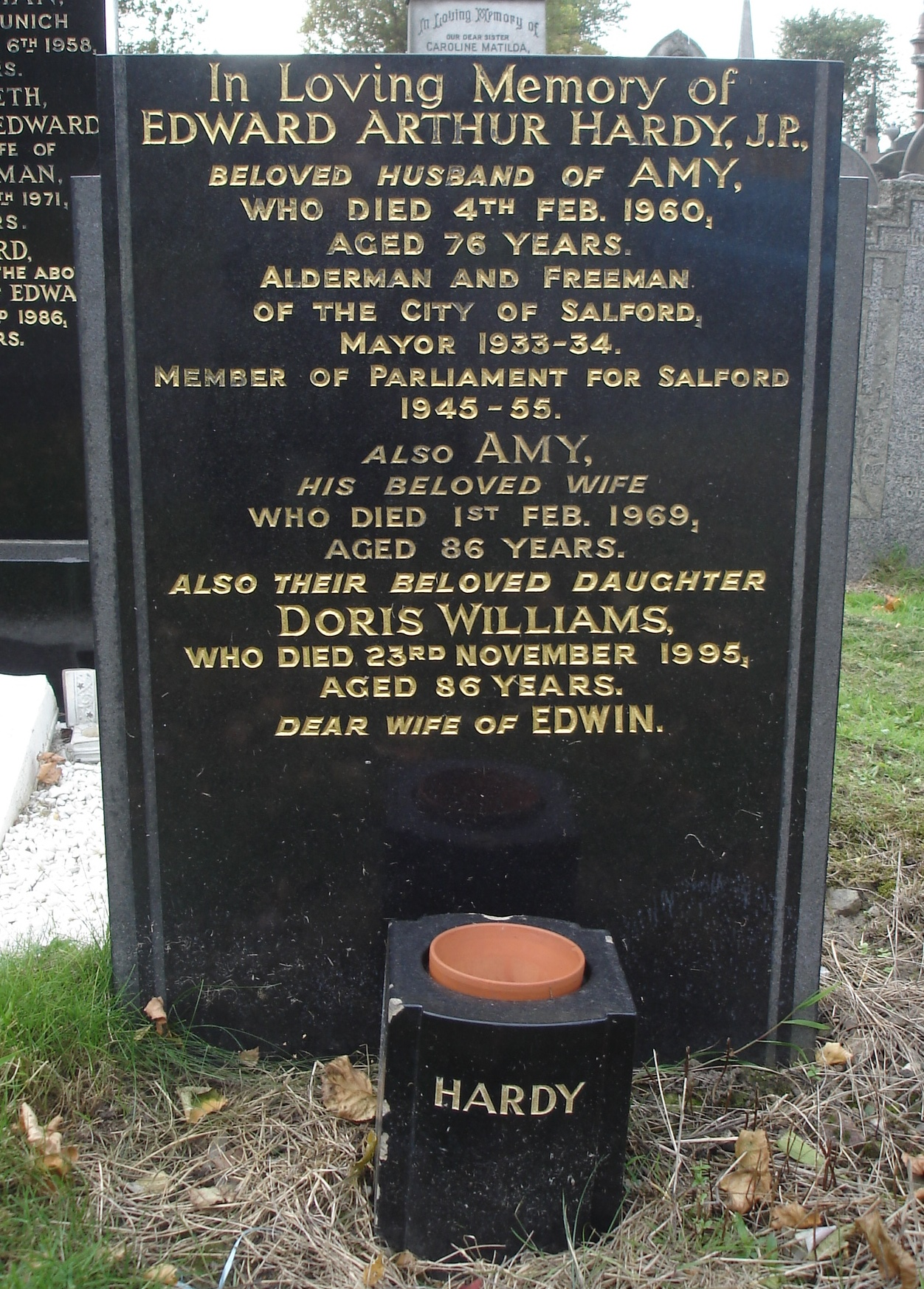
Grave of Edward Hardy

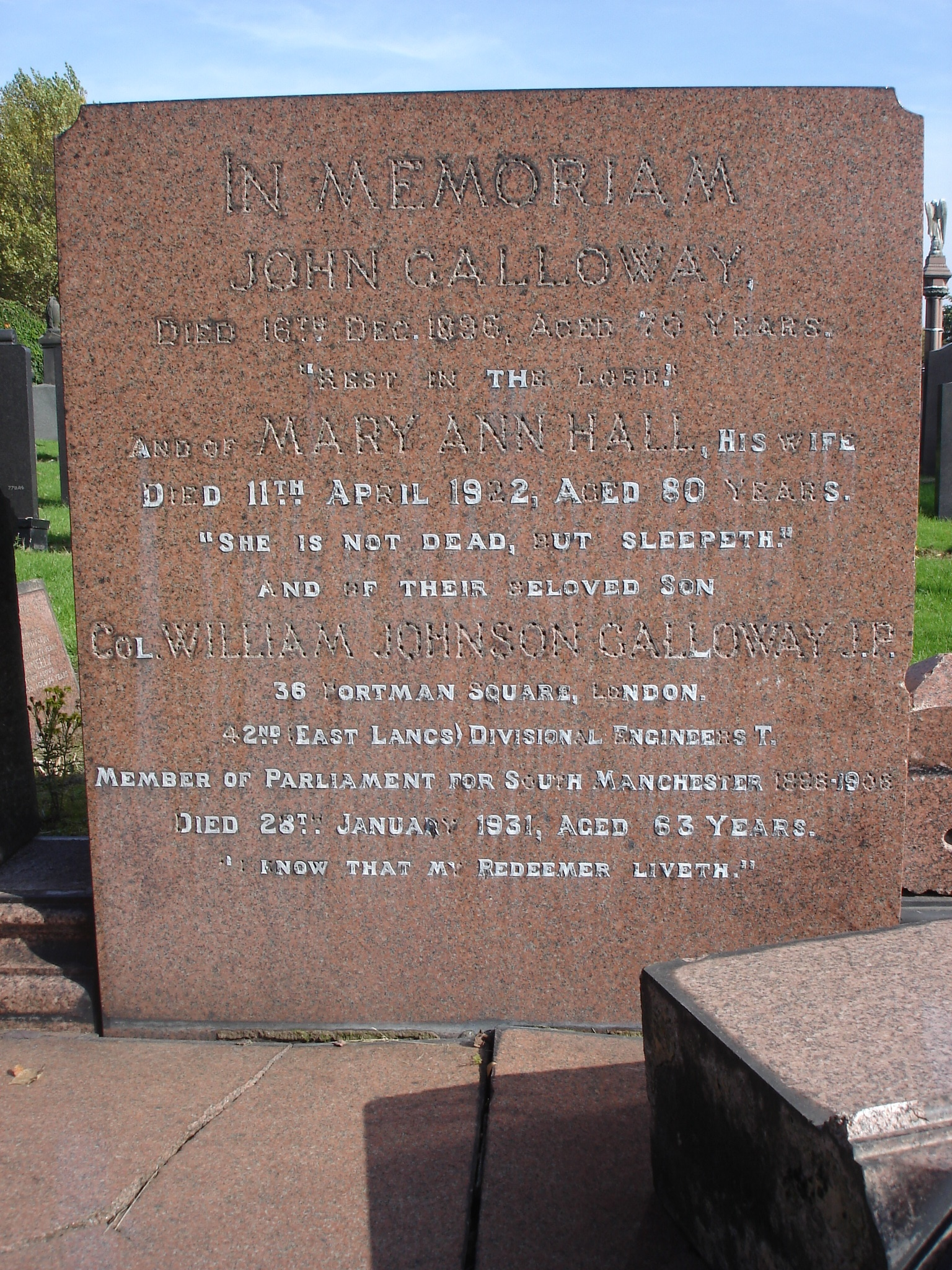
Grave of Galloway family

== War graves ==
The cemetery contains the graves of 373 Commonwealth service personnel who died during the First and Second World Wars, plus numerous memorials to servicemen buried abroad. Some of the 274 First World War dead lie in war grave plots in both the Church of England and Roman Catholic sections, each plot having a screen memorial listing the dead buried within them, while the 99 Second World War dead are scattered amidst the cemetery and there is also a special memorial listing seven personnel buried in graves that could not be marked.
