= Joseph Brotherton =

English politician, minister and activist (1783–1857)

The Right Honourable Joseph Brotherton
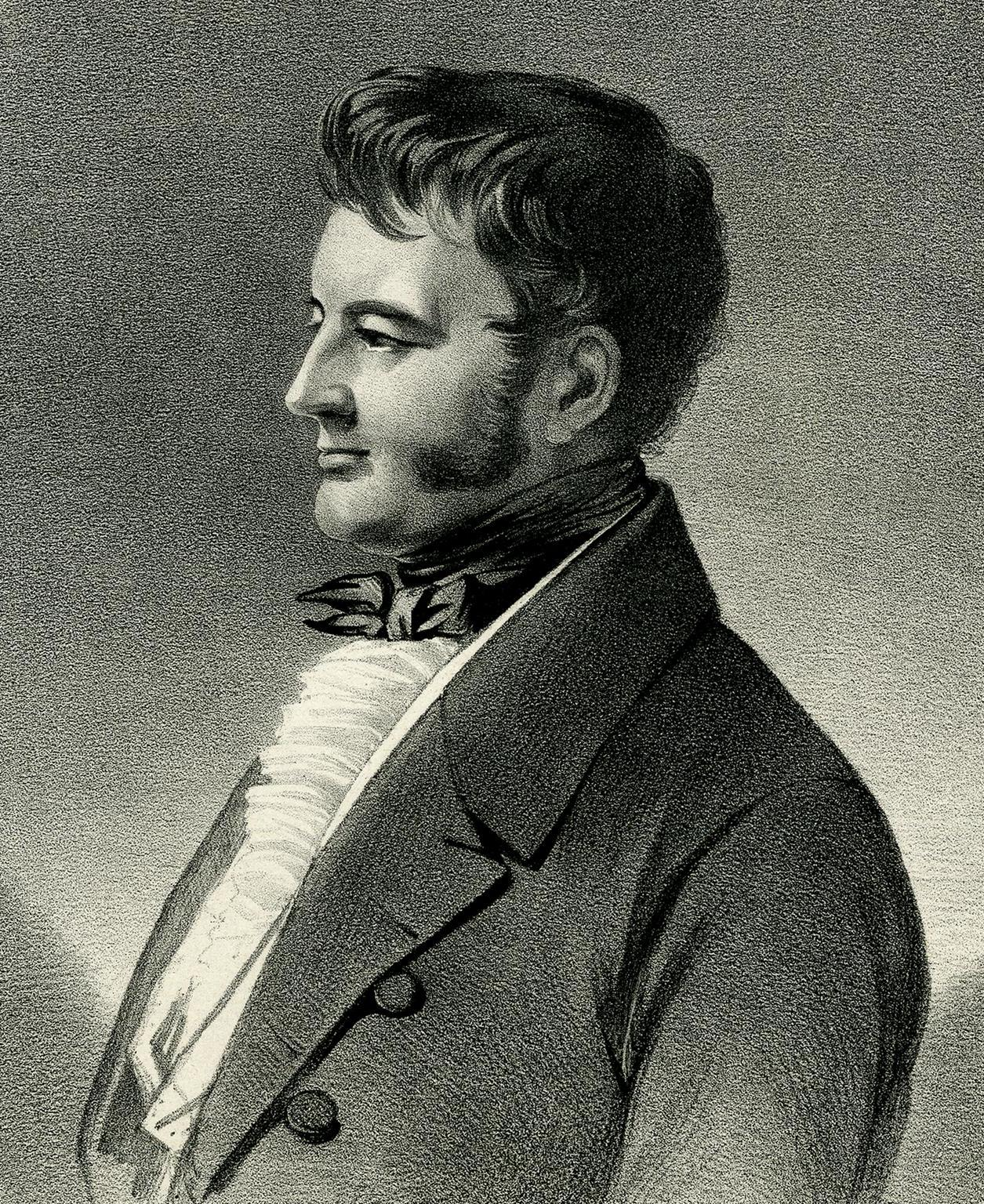
- Brotherton, c. 1850
- Born: 22 May 1783; Whittington, England
- Died: 7 January 1857 (aged 73); Manchester, England
- Resting place: Weaste Cemetery, Salford, England
- Occupations: Politician; minister; activist
- Political party: Liberal Party
- Spouse: Martha Harvey (m. 1806)
- Children: 4, including Helen
- Relatives: William Harvey (cousin and brother-in-law)

Joseph Brotherton (22 May 1783 – 7 January 1857) was an English reforming politician, Bible Christian minister, and vegetarianism activist. He was the first Member of Parliament for Salford and has been described as the first vegetarian member of parliament.

== Biography ==
=== Early life and family ===
Brotherton was born in Whittington, near Chesterfield, Derbyshire, the son of John Brotherton, an excise collector, and his wife Mary Broomhead. In 1789, the family moved to Salford, Lancashire, where his father established a cotton and silk mill.

Brotherton received no formal education and joined the family firm, becoming a partner in 1802. After his father's death in 1809, he entered into partnership with his cousin William Harvey (1787–1870). In 1806, he married his business partner's sister and cousin, Martha Harvey (1782–1861). Their children were Helen (1812–898), John (1813–1813), James (1814–1871), and Mary.

=== Bible Christian Church ===
In 1805, Brotherton joined the Salford Swedenborgian church led by William Cowherd. The church was renamed the Bible Christian Church in 1809. After Cowherd's death in 1816, Brotherton became a minister. The church required members to abstain from meat and alcoholic drink. In 1812, his wife published Vegetable Cookery, an early vegetarian cookbook.

In 1819, aged 36, Brotherton retired from the family business to devote more time to his ministry. He supported local social reforms, including the building of schools, the opening of a lending library, and the establishment of a fund for victims of the Peterloo Massacre. He was a member of the Portico Library, an overseer of the poor, and a justice of the peace.

=== Membership of the Little Circle ===
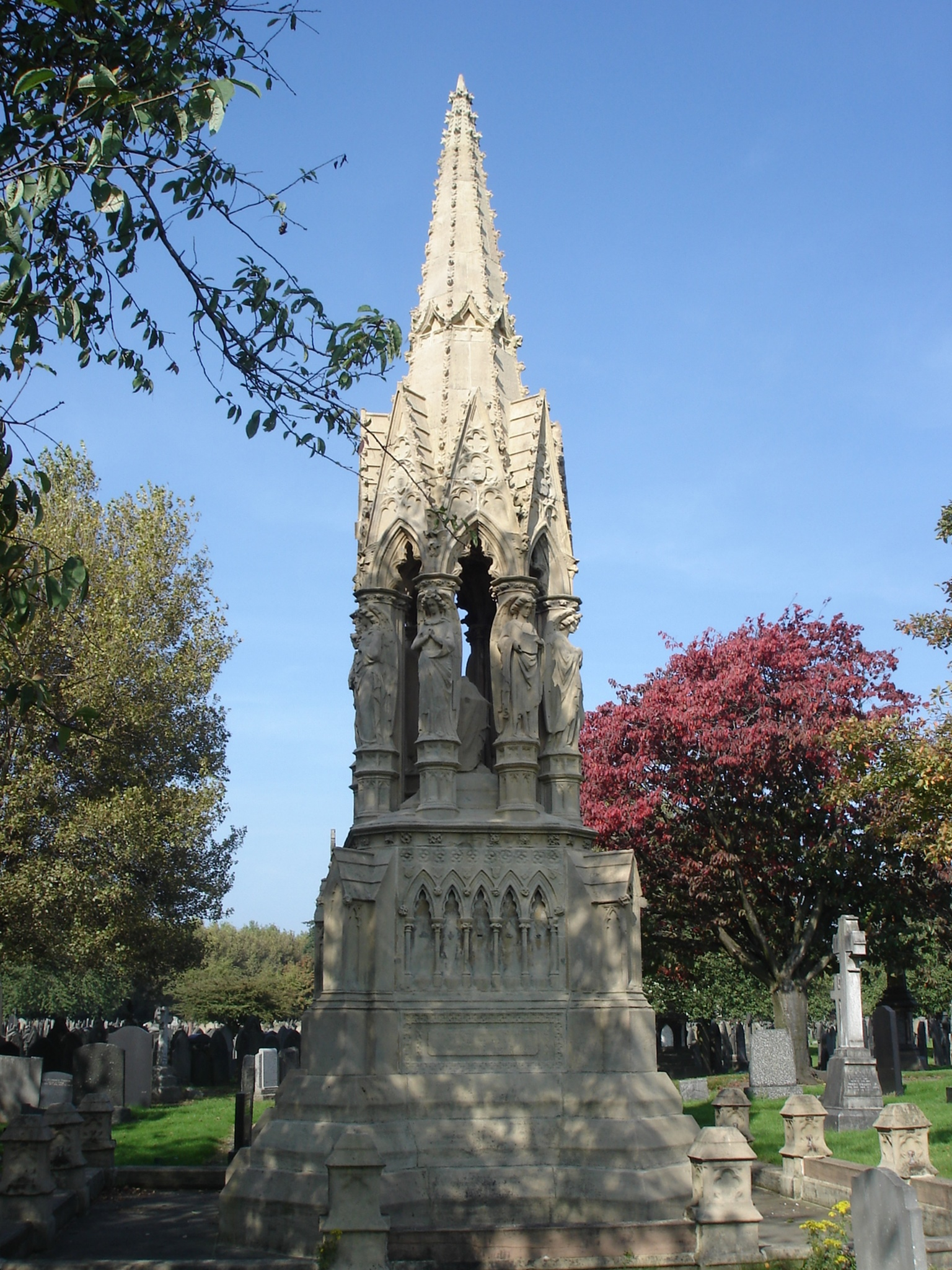
Funerary monument of Joseph Brotherton, Weaste Cemetery

From 1815, Brotherton was a member of a group of Nonconformist Liberals that met at the Manchester home of John Potter. The group was later called the Little Circle. Other members included John Edward Taylor, founder of The Manchester Guardian; Archibald Prentice, later editor of the Manchester Times; John Shuttleworth; Absalom Watkin; William Cowdroy Jr, editor of the Manchester Gazette; Thomas Potter; and Richard Potter. In 1820, Brotherton, Shuttleworth, and Thomas Potter founded the Manchester Chamber of Commerce.

In 1821, after the Peterloo Massacre and the closure of the Manchester Observer, members of the group, excluding Cowdroy, supported John Edward Taylor in founding The Manchester Guardian.

After John Potter's death, the Potter brothers formed a second Little Circle group to campaign for parliamentary reform. The group called for more proportional representation in parliament for fast-growing industrial towns such as Birmingham, Leeds, Manchester, and Salford, in place of representation through rotten boroughs. After a petition raised on the group's behalf by Absalom Watkin, Parliament passed the Reform Act 1832.

=== Salford member of parliament ===
Following the Reform Act 1832, Brotherton was elected as Salford's first Member of Parliament at the 1832 general election. He was re-elected five times, including two unopposed elections. In parliament, he campaigned against the death penalty, supported the abolition of slavery, and advocated free non-denominational education. He supported the Municipal Corporations Bill, which created elected councils in Manchester and Salford. He also took an interest in municipal facilities, and was involved in the opening of Peel Park, Salford, and Weaste Cemetery.

=== Vegetarianism ===
Brotherton regarded vegetarianism as connected with health, moral reform, and social peace. His views linked temperance in food and drink with the reduction of social misery and the increase of happiness.

During the food shortages of 1847, Brotherton helped to set up vegetable soup kitchens in Manchester. After this, he worked with other local vegetarians to establish an organisation promoting vegetarianism. He chaired the inaugural meeting of the Vegetarian Society in September 1847. In its early years, the society used pamphlets by Brotherton to promote its views.

=== Death and legacy ===
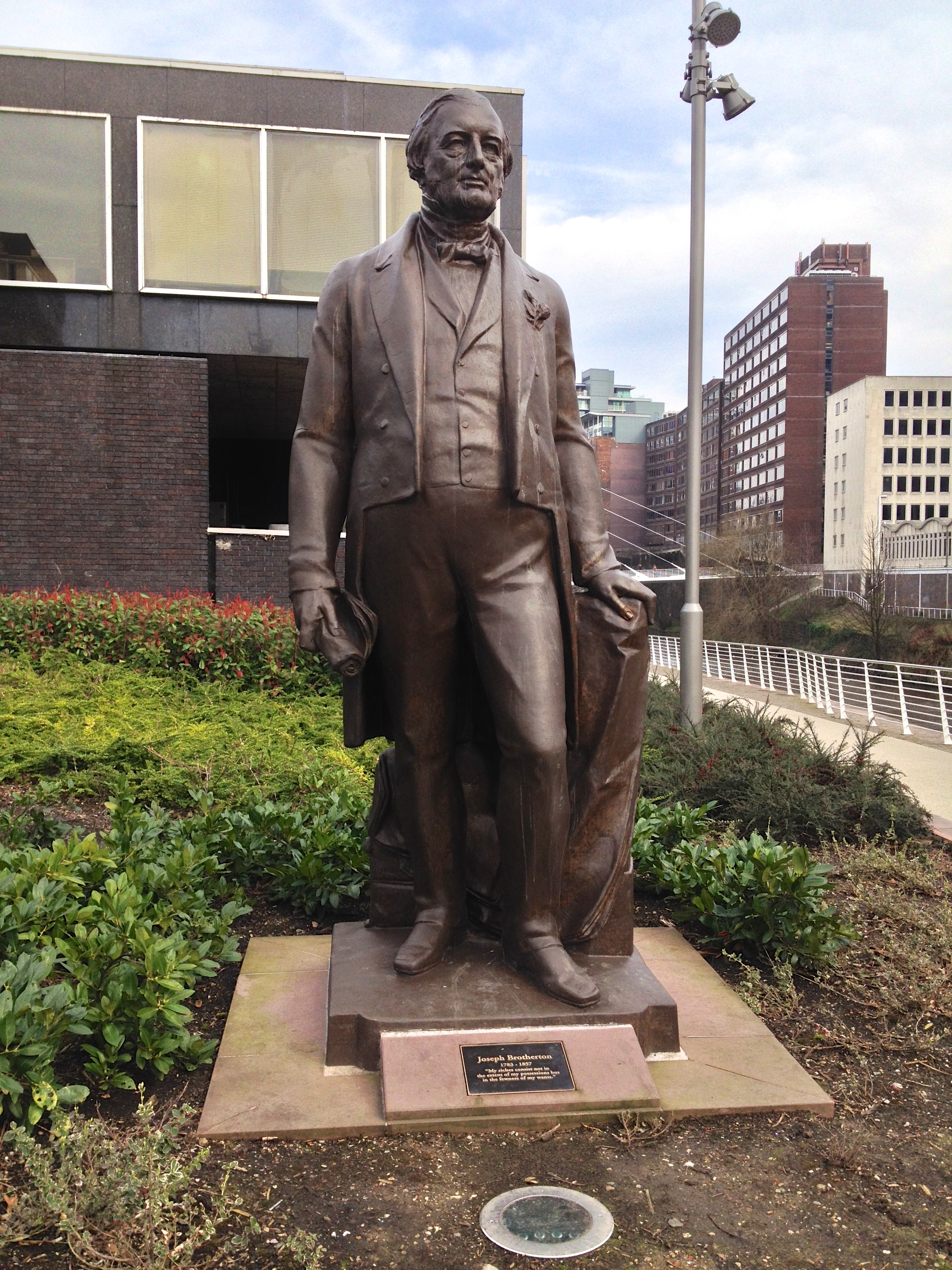
Statue of Joseph Brotherton in Salford

Brotherton died suddenly from a heart attack in January 1857, aged 73, while travelling to a meeting in Manchester. He was buried on 14 January in Weaste Cemetery, Salford, following a funeral procession two and a half miles long. His burial was the first interment at the cemetery, which he had campaigned for.

A Joseph Brotherton Memorial Fund was established, and a statue of Brotherton was erected in Peel Park in 1858. The statue was dismantled in 1954 and sold into private ownership in 1969. Salford City Council sold it to a scrap-metal merchant, who then approached Manchester City Council. Manchester City Council purchased the statue in 1986 and placed it at Riverside Walk, overlooking the River Irwell and facing Salford. It was later relocated to the Salford bank of the Irwell to make way for a new footbridge linking Salford to the Spinningfields development. In May 2018, the statue was returned to Peel Park and placed on a replica of its original plinth. The statue was listed in December 2023.

== See also ==
- Christian vegetarianism
- History of vegetarianism
- Vegetarianism in the Victorian era
- Vegetarianism in the United Kingdom
- Temperance movement in the United Kingdom

Parliament of the United Kingdom
New constituency	Member of Parliament for Salford; 1832 – 1857	Succeeded by Edward Ryley Langworthy
