= Vegetarianism in the Victorian era =

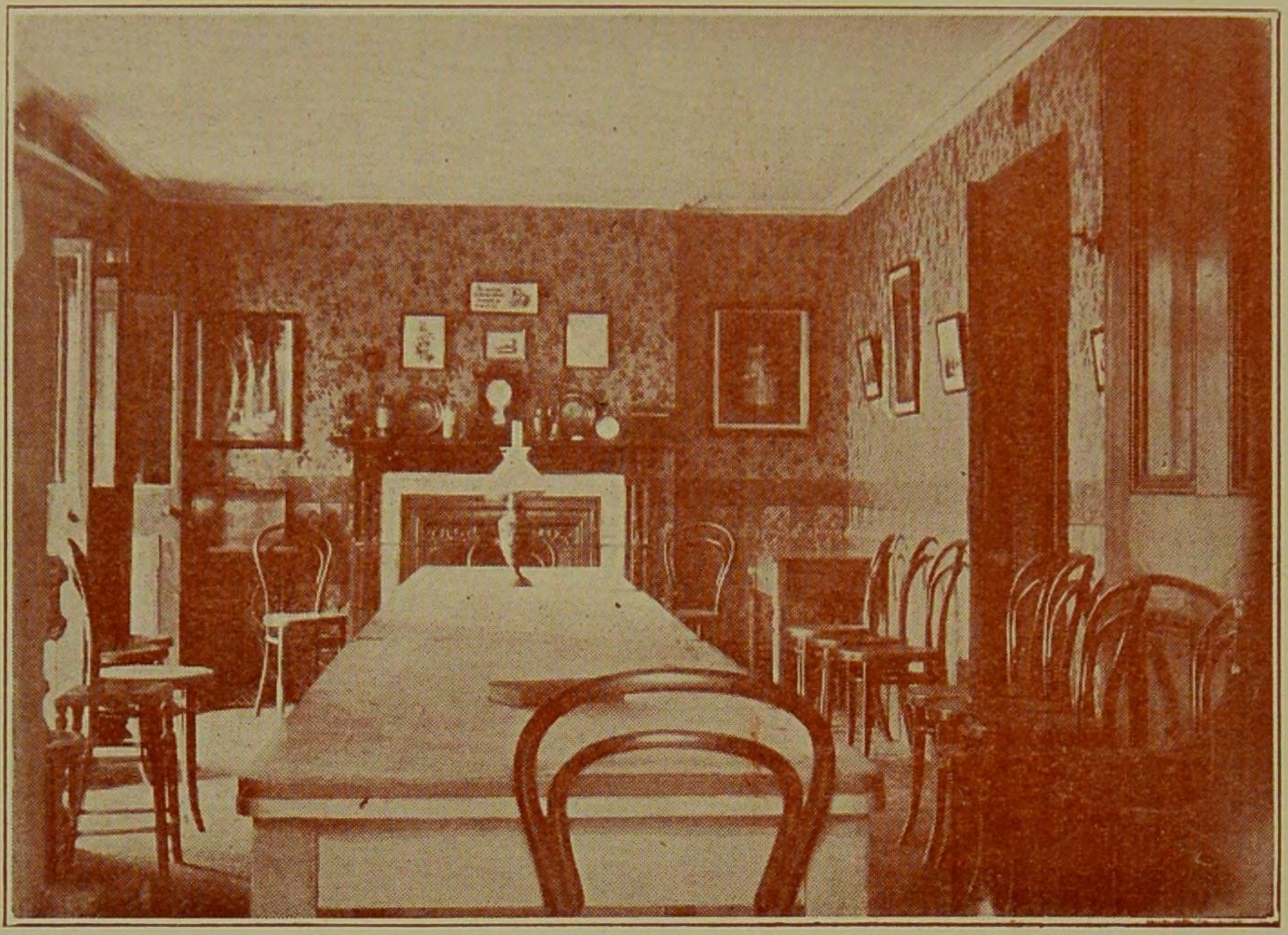
Interior of Northwood Villa, where the Vegetarian Society was founded in 1847

The organised movement of vegetarianism developed, in the Victorian era, from earlier religious and medical advocacy and took institutional form with the founding of the Vegetarian Society in 1847. The word "vegetarian" was in print by 1842 and came into wider use in the late 1840s. Victorian vegetarian organisations generally defined vegetarianism as abstention from the flesh of animals, including fish, flesh and fowl, rather than from all animal products. In practice this often included what is now called ovo-lacto vegetarianism.

Advocates promoted vegetarianism on health, humanitarian, religious and economic grounds through lectures, tracts, periodicals and cookery advice. The subject was also discussed in connection with hydropathy and other forms of health reform, and appeared in restaurants, periodicals and self-improvement circles. Press coverage ranged from satire to reports of dinners and meetings. The organised movement remained small relative to the population: by 1899, Britain's vegetarian societies reported almost 7,000 members and associates.

== Background ==
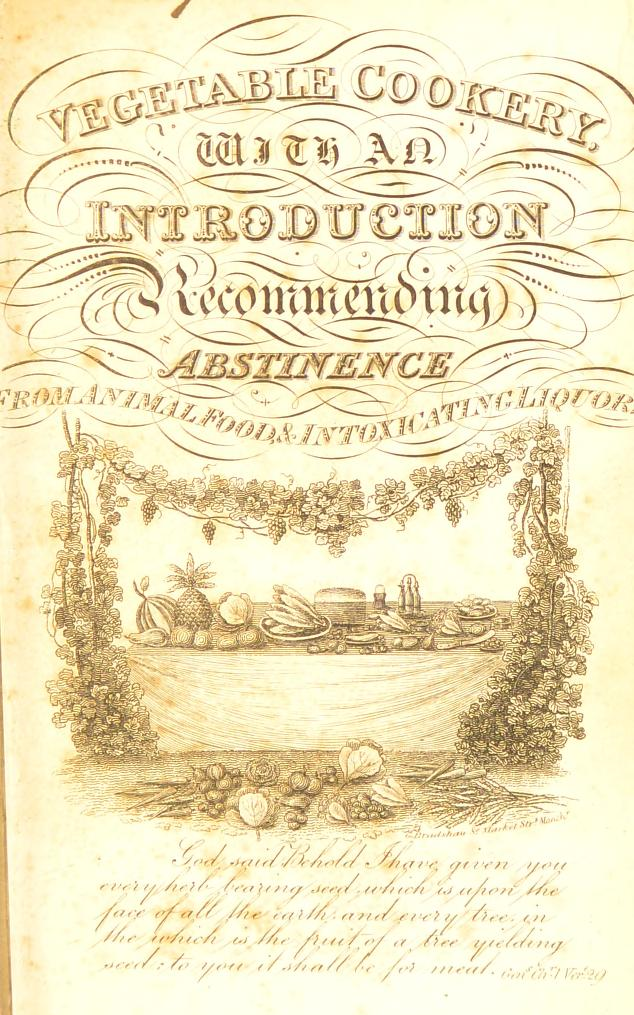
Title page of Martha Brotherton's Vegetable Cookery (1812), described as the first vegetarian cookbook

Victorian readers encountered older religious, philosophical and literary arguments for abstaining from meat, but the word "vegetarian" and the organised movement were still unfamiliar to many people in the 1840s. The term appeared in print in the Healthian Journal by 1842, although some later accounts credit the 1847 inaugural meeting of the Vegetarian Society with popularising or coining the word.

One antecedent was the Bible Christian Church founded by William Cowherd in Salford, which promoted a vegetable diet from 1809. Within this circle, Martha Brotherton published Vegetable Cookery (1812), often described as an early English-language vegetarian cookbook and a model for later reform cookery. The London physician William Lambe also advocated a plant-food-only regimen in the early nineteenth century. Transatlantic connections included the educational reformers James Pierrepont Greaves and Amos Bronson Alcott. These networks overlapped with British and American health-reform circles that discussed meatless diets on moral and physiological grounds.

== Organisation and advocacy ==
=== Vegetarian Society ===
==== Formation ====
Meetings at Alcott House in July 1847 led to the founding of the Vegetarian Society at Northwood Villa, Ramsgate, on 30 September 1847. The meeting was chaired by the MP Joseph Brotherton. James Simpson was elected president, William Horsell secretary, and William Oldham treasurer.

==== Definition of vegetarianism ====
The society defined vegetarianism as abstention from the flesh of animals, not from all animal products. Period writings stated that "milk and eggs may be termed animal products, but they are not flesh", and the society's aim was "to induce habits of abstinence from the Flesh of Animals (fish, flesh, fowl) as Food". This definition usually included ovo-lacto vegetarianism.

==== Activities and outreach ====
The society brought together social reformers, philanthropists and Christians who promoted abstention from flesh on moral and health grounds. Its activities included public meetings, lectures, tract distribution, journals, handbooks and cookery advice. Some material was aimed at households, while other publications were intended for readers in self-improvement institutions such as mechanics' institutes.

==== Local and regional associations ====
A network of local secretaries developed soon after the Vegetarian Society was founded. These secretaries arranged meetings and committees, and helped create formally constituted branches affiliated with the national society. The Manchester and Salford Vegetarian Advocates Society was formed in 1849, followed by the Liverpool Vegetarian Association around 1852. By 1853 new associations had appeared in Birmingham, Leeds and Glasgow, with others in towns including Accrington, Bolton, Boston, Chester, Colchester, Dunfermline, Dumfries, Malton, Newcastle upon Tyne, Ormskirk, Sheffield and Worcester. By 1855 there were at least a dozen local associations. Later groups appeared in Edinburgh, Rawtenstall and Crawshawbooth, Paisley, Brighton and Sheffield. Many branches depended on a small number of active members and struggled when those members left. By the late 1860s the branch system had begun to decline.

=== Other organisations ===
Other vegetarian and food reform bodies were founded in Britain during the Victorian era. They promoted meatless diets through regional, social and religious networks:

- British and Foreign Society for the Promotion of Humanity and Abstinence from Animal Food (1843)
- London Vegetarian Association (1852)
- London Food Reform Society (1875; merged with the Vegetarian Society in 1885; formerly known as the London Dietetic Reform Society or Dietetic Reform Society, and later known as the National Food Reform Society)
- Order of the Golden Age (1882; re-established in 1895)
- Vegetarian Cycling Club (1887; formally founded 1888; later the Vegetarian Cycling and Athletics club)
- London Vegetarian Rambling Club (1888)
- London Vegetarian Society (1888; breakaway from the Vegetarian Society; also known as the London Vegetarian Association)
- Vegetarian Amateur Athletic Club (1890)
- Scottish Vegetarian Society (1892)
- Women's Vegetarian Union (1895)
- Manchester and District Vegetarian Cycling Club (1899)
- Vegetarian Federal Union (1899)
- Children's Vegetarian Society (1899)
- Junior Scottish Vegetarian Society (1900)
- Friends Vegetarian Society (1902; Quaker organisation)

=== Links with health reform ===
Vegetarian advocacy in the 1840s and 1850s overlapped with hydropathy and the popular health-reform press. In these circles, diet was treated both as a moral question and as a matter of physiology.

=== Publications and supporters ===
Movement periodicals and allied titles included the Healthian Journal and the Truth Tester, as well as tracts and handbooks for general readers and self-improvement audiences. Contemporary accounts noted support from public figures including John Passmore Edwards and Annie Besant.

== Vegetarian venues and cuisine ==
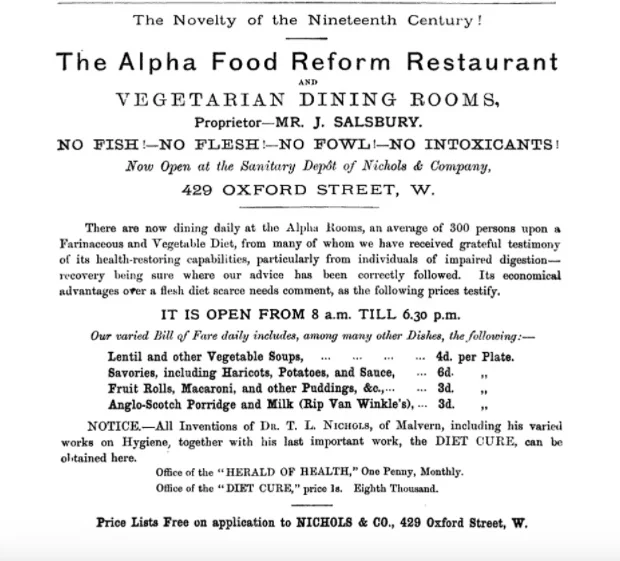
Advertisement for the Alpha Food Reform Restaurant

Vegetarian restaurants opened in larger cities and served clerks, students and reform-minded professionals. Newspapers and illustrated weeklies reported set menus of pies, fritters, ground-rice moulds and fruit. By the late nineteenth century, manufactured meat substitutes sold as "nut meats" were available in restaurants and shops. Mainstream cookery books also included meat-free recipes; the 1880 edition of Mrs Beeton's Book of Household Management had a chapter on vegetarian recipes.

The earliest known vegetarian restaurants were Barnesley's Vegetarian and Temperance Hotel and Mrs. Hollinworth's Vegetarian Dining Room, both opened in Manchester in the 1850s. In 1879, the Alpha vegetarian restaurant opened at 23 Oxford Street in London. It was run by T. L. Nichols. Nichols was also associated with the Alpha Food Reform Restaurant, managed by James Salisbury in the 1880s at 429 Oxford Street.

In 1881, the Vegetarian Company's Saloon opened in Manchester. The same year, London had eight vegetarian restaurants. In Glasgow, the Garden Restaurant opened at 17 Bothwell Street in 1892, followed by the Eden Restaurant in 1893. In 1896, the Pitman Vegetarian Restaurant opened in the County Buildings, Corporation Street, Birmingham. The building is now Grade II* listed. In 1898, the restaurant expanded into the Pitman Vegetarian Hotel.

== Motivations ==
=== Health ===
Advocates claimed that a vegetable diet protected against diseases including cholera and tuberculosis, and some institutions were established on vegetarian lines. Part of the movement overlapped with anti-vaccination activism, especially among campaigners who associated health with bodily purity.

=== Humanitarian and animal protection arguments ===
Vegetarian campaigners criticised urban slaughterhouses and butchers' displays, and argued that meat-eating depended on cruelty to animals. Some sought, without success, to associate the RSPCA with abstention from meat. Later campaigners also opposed vivisection and the killing of birds and seals for fashionable clothing.

=== Religious conviction ===
Religious motivations were important in early vegetarian advocacy. Sermons and congregational rules presented abstention from flesh as consistent with bodily health and Christian reform. These arguments continued within the Victorian movement.

=== Social and political reform ===
Vegetarianism intersected with socialism, Owenism and, later, with circles around the Humanitarian League. Some suffragettes met in vegetarian restaurants after release from prison. Public figures including George Bernard Shaw and Isaac Pitman also supported vegetarianism.

=== Household economy and thrift ===
Proponents presented vegetarianism as a way to reduce household food expenditure. They often connected thrift with moral and intellectual self-improvement. Cheap or free meals were offered through bodies such as the National Food Reform Society.

== Reception and debate ==
Newspapers and periodicals reported on vegetarian meetings, restaurants and debates. Coverage ranged from humorous sketches in Punch to descriptive accounts, including an 1851 dinner at the Freemasons' Tavern in London that detailed the menu and commented on diners' appearance. Critics associated vegetarian diets with the austerity of workhouses and prisons. Others argued that reducing household expenditure on meat could depress wages by lowering the accepted standard of living. Some writers, drawing on imperial and military ideals, associated meat with virility and stamina and questioned whether a vegetable diet was suitable for manual labourers. Later commentators note that Victorian vegetarian argument often combined moral claims with appeals to contemporary physiology, a mixture that made it a target for satire and accusations of zealotry.

== Scale and membership ==
Vegetarian organisations grew from small beginnings in the early 1840s. By 1899, the Vegetarian Society and the London Vegetarian Society together reported almost 7,000 members and associates. The movement nevertheless remained small in relation to the British population, especially in a society where many poorer people aspired to eat more meat rather than less.

== Later influence ==
By the end of the nineteenth century, vegetarianism in Britain had organisations, restaurants, periodicals and cookery literature. These institutions continued to shape food-reform, animal-protection and vegetarian campaigns in the twentieth century.

== See also ==
- British cuisine
- History of vegetarianism
- Humanitarian movement
- Society and culture of the Victorian era
- Temperance movement in the United Kingdom
- Victorian cuisine
