= James Simpson (Bible Christian) =

English deacon and social reformer (1812–1859)

The Reverend James Simpson JP
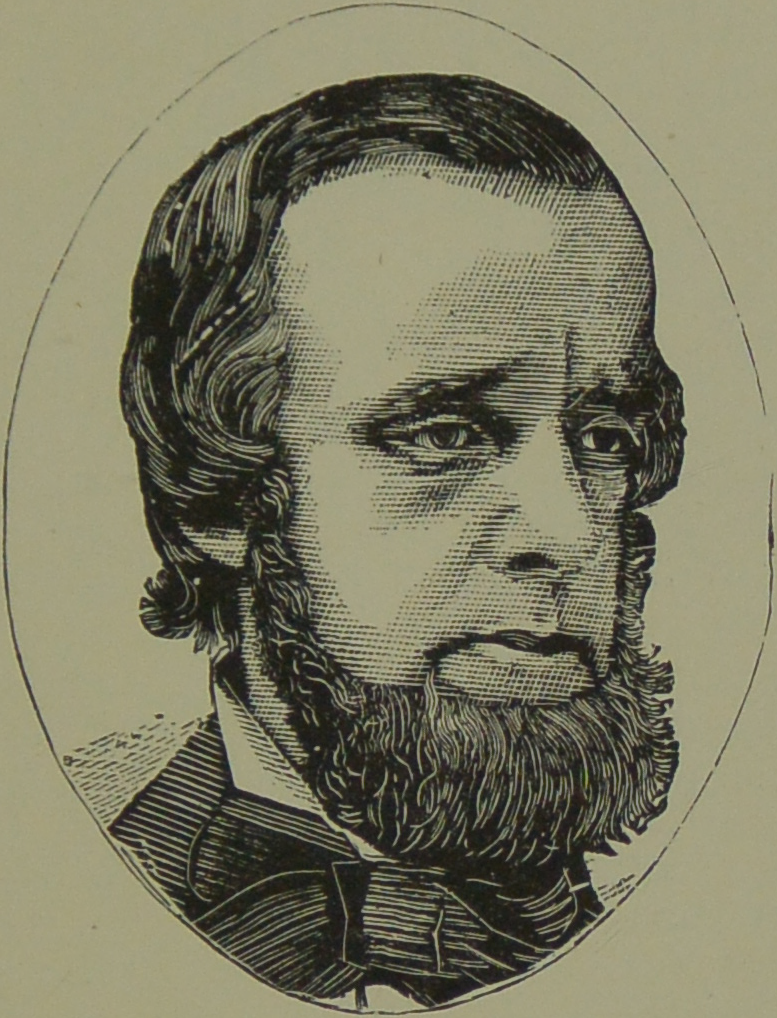
- Simpson in Fifty Years of Food Reform (1898)
- Born: 9 July 1812; Clitheroe, Lancashire, England
- Died: 2 September 1859 (aged 47); Foxhill Bank, near Accrington, Lancashire, England
- Burial place: St James' Church, Church Kirk
- Occupations: Deacon; social reformer
- Known for: Vegetarianism activism
- Notable work: The Vegetarian Messenger
- Title: President of the Vegetarian Society
- Term: 1847–1859
- Successor: William Harvey
- Spouse: Hannah Harvey (m. 1843)
- Children: 2
- Relatives: William Harvey (father-in-law)

James Simpson JP (9 July 1812 – 2 September 1859) was an English Bible Christian deacon and social reformer. Based at Foxhill Bank, near Accrington, Lancashire, he was active in vegetarianism, temperance, anti-tobacco campaigning, the anti-Corn Law movement, and the peace movement. He was a member of the Anti-Corn Law League, a vice-president of the United Kingdom Alliance, and a justice of the peace for Lancashire.

Simpson co-founded the Vegetarian Society and served as its first president from 1847 until his death. He later published and edited the society's journal, The Vegetarian Messenger. He was a lifelong vegetarian and a deacon of the Bible Christian Church.

== Biography ==
=== Early life and education ===
James Simpson Jr. was born on 9 July 1812 in Clitheroe, Lancashire. He was the son of James Simpson Sr., a wealthy calico printer. The family later moved to Foxhill Bank, near Accrington. They were members of the Bible Christian Church.

Simpson was educated by Rev. W. Wood at Hybrake House, Altham. He later received private tuition in London and Berlin. He intended to pursue a career in law, but did not do so; the temperance historian Samuel Couling attributed this to his moral principles. After his father's death, Simpson inherited a large fortune.

=== Public life ===
Simpson supported a range of social and political reforms. A member of the Anti-Corn Law League, he was also involved in the temperance movement. He served as vice-president of the United Kingdom Alliance. He was also a prominent member of the Lancashire Liberal Party. He was a justice of the peace for the county palatine of Lancaster.

=== Vegetarianism ===
Simpson was a lifelong vegetarian. According to the International Vegetarian Union, his vegetarianism was encouraged by his mother, the Bible Christian Church's dietary teaching, and Swedenborgian influence. He also served as a deacon of the church.

Simpson co-founded the Vegetarian Society and was elected its first president in 1847. From 1849, he published and edited the society's journal, The Vegetarian Messenger. His travels abroad were reported as contributing to the establishment of vegetarian societies outside Britain. He anonymously published two works on vegetarianism.

=== Personal life and death ===
Simpson married Hannah Harvey in 1843. They had two children. His father-in-law was William Harvey, who was Mayor of Salford from 1857 to 1859, and a prominent Bible Christian.

Simpson died on 2 September 1859, aged 47, at Foxhill Bank, near Accrington. He had been ill for 18 months. He was buried at St James' Church, Church Kirk. A 30-foot (9.1 m) obelisk was erected in his memory.

== Legacy ==
Historian James Gregory notes that one of Simpson's lectures on vegetarianism inspired T. Anderson Hanson to become a vegetarian.

== Publications ==
- Conversations on Abstinence from the Flesh of Animals as Food (London: Whittaker & Co., 1846)
- The Products of the Vegetable Kingdom vs the Flesh of Animals as Food (London: Whittaker & Co., 1847)
- A Few Recipes of Vegetable Diet with Suggestions for the Formation of a Dietary, from which the Flesh of Animals is Excluded... (London: Whittaker & Co., 1847)
- A Letter to the Rt. Hon. H. Labouchere, on the More Effective Application of the System of Relief by Means of Soup Kitchens (London: Whittaker & Co., 1847)
- (as editor) The Vegetarian Messenger (1849–1859)

== See also ==
- Christian vegetarianism
- History of vegetarianism
- Vegetarianism in the Victorian era
- Vegetarianism in the United Kingdom
- Temperance movement in the United Kingdom
