= Kathryn Gleadle =

British historian and academic (born 1968)

Professor Kathryn Gleadle
- Born: Kathryn Jane Gleadle; 8 September 1968 (age 58)
- Title: Professor of Gender and Women's History

Academic background
- Education: University of Warwick
- Thesis: The early feminists: radical Unitarians and the emergence of the women's rights movement, c.1831-1851 (1993)
- Doctoral advisor: Fred Reid

Kathryn Jane Gleadle (born 9 August 1968) is a British historian and academic specialising in the experiences of British women in the late 18th and 19th centuries. She was Fellow and Tutor in History at Mansfield College, Oxford from 2004 to 2023. In 2015, she was appointed a Professor of Gender and Women's History by the University of Oxford.

== Career ==
Gleadle completed her undergraduate and doctoral studies at the University of Warwick. Her doctoral thesis, supervised by Fred Reid, was entitled The early feminists: radical Unitarians and the emergence of the women's rights movement, c.1831-1851 and was completed in 1993. After obtaining her doctorate she began a British Academy Postdoctoral Fellowship at London Guildhall University. She was a fellow of University College, Oxford, from 2002 to 2004, when she was appointed a fellow of Mansfield College, Oxford, and a university lecturer in modern history, appointments made permanent in 2009. In 2015, she was awarded the title of Professor of Gender and Women's History by the University of Oxford. Gleadle had to take ill-health retirement in 2023.

== Honours ==
Gleadle was the recipient of a Philip Leverhulme Prize in 2004.

== Works ==
Gleadle's research focuses on women's experiences in 18th- and 19th-century Britain, especially with reference to political culture, while she also engages in debates about feminist and gender history theory. Her studies have also focused on the role that Victorian women played in the process of globalisation, and on the way British children have been involved in political processes. Gleadle's published works include:

- "The juvenile enlightenment: British children and youth during the French Revolution", Past and Present, vol. 233, issue 1 (2016), pp. 143–184
- "'The riches and treasures of other countries': women, empire and maritime expertise in early Victorian London", Gender & History, vol. 25, no. 1 (2013), pp. 7–26
- "Gentry, Gender and the Moral economy during the Revolutionary and Napoleonic Wars in Provincial England" in Rappoport, J., and Dalley, L., Economic Women: Desire and Dispossession in Nineteenth-Century British Culture (Ohio State University, 2013)
- "The imagined communities of women's history: current debates and emerging themes, a rhizomatic approach", Women's History Review (2013)
- "'WE WILL HAVE IT': Children and Protest in the Ten Hours Movement" in Goose, N., Honeyman, K. (eds.), Childhood and Child Labour (Ashgate, 2012)
- Borderline Citizens: Women, Gender and Political Culture, 1780–1860 (Oxford University Press USA, 2009)
- British Women in the 19th Century (Palgrave Macillan, 2001)
