= Bible Christian Church (vegetarian) =

Christian vegetarian sect, 1809–1932

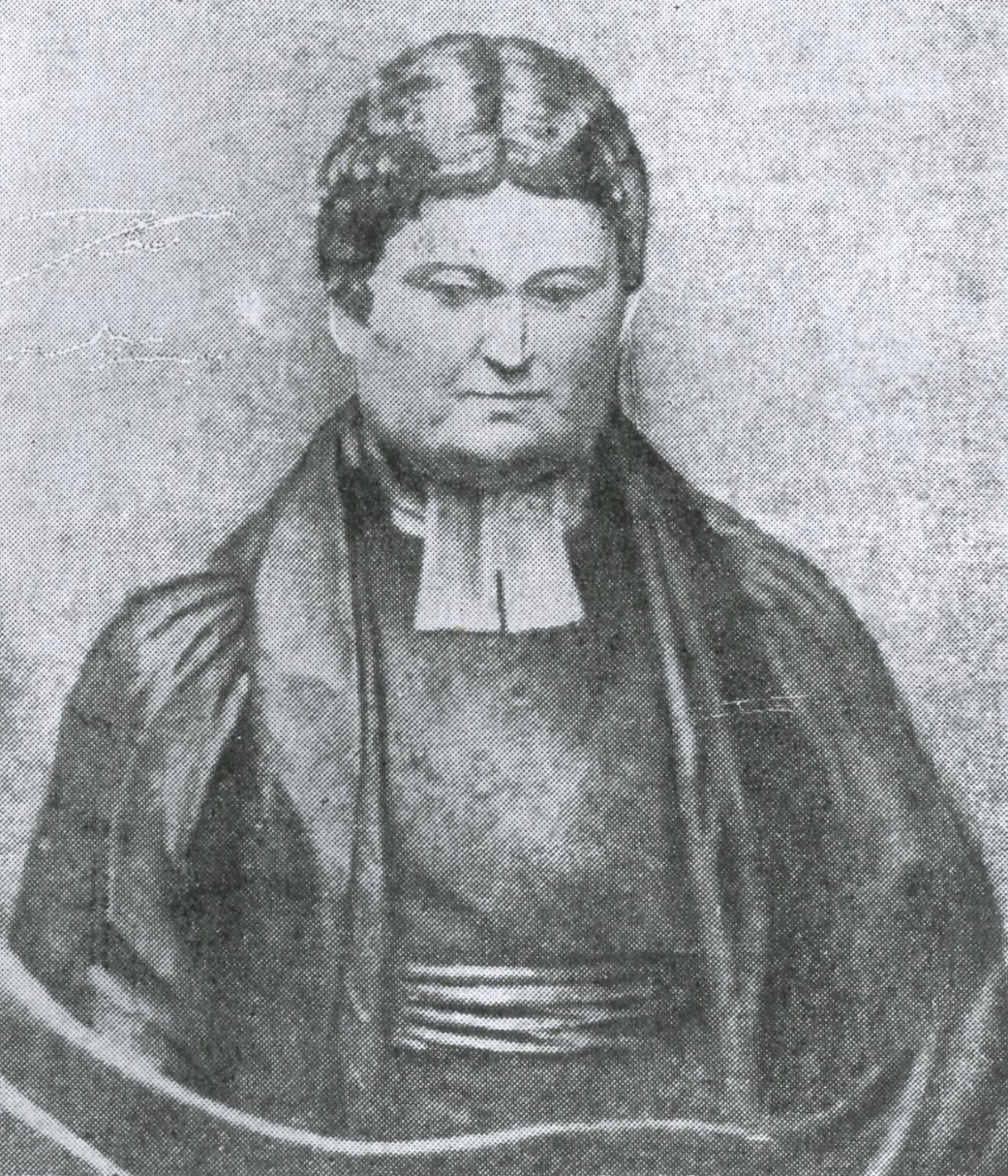
- William Cowherd, founder
- Classification: Christian vegetarian
- Orientation: Swedenborgianism
- Associations: Vegetarian Society
- Founder: William Cowherd
- Origin: 1809; 217 years ago Salford, Lancashire, England
- Separated from: Swedenborgians
- Merged into: Pendleton Unitarians
- Defunct: 1932; 94 years ago
- Other name: Cowherdites

The Bible Christian Church was a Christian vegetarian sect founded by William Cowherd in Salford, Lancashire, in 1809, after a split from the Swedenborgians. Its members followed a vegetarian diet and abstained from alcohol.

The church was associated with the early vegetarian movement in Britain. Members including Joseph Brotherton and James Simpson helped establish the Vegetarian Society in 1847. A group led by William Metcalfe and James Clark formed the Philadelphia Bible Christian Church in 1817, which became part of the early American vegetarian movement.

== History ==
=== Salford and Manchester Bible Christians ===
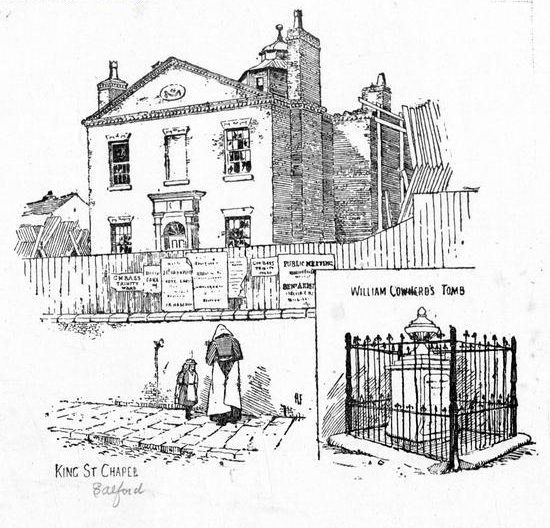
King Street Chapel and William Cowherd's tomb, Salford

William Cowherd founded the Bible Christian Church following a split from the Swedenborgians. Its first chapel was known as Christ Church and was located in King Street, Salford, Lancashire. The church later moved to new premises in Cross Lane. Further chapels were established in Hulme and Every Street, Ancoats.

To join the church, members had to sign a pledge that committed them to a vegetarian diet and abstention from alcohol. Followers of Cowherd's ideas were commonly known as Bible Christians or Cowherdites. Members of the church, including Joseph Brotherton and James Simpson, were involved in the founding of the Vegetarian Society in 1847.

In 1816, Cowherd died and Joseph Brotherton was appointed his successor. Brotherton held the position for 40 years until his death in 1857. He was succeeded by James Clark (1830–1905) in 1858, who served as pastor for nearly 50 years.

By 1932, unable to attract enough vegetarian members, the English Bible Christians merged into the Pendleton Unitarians.

=== Philadelphia Bible Christians ===
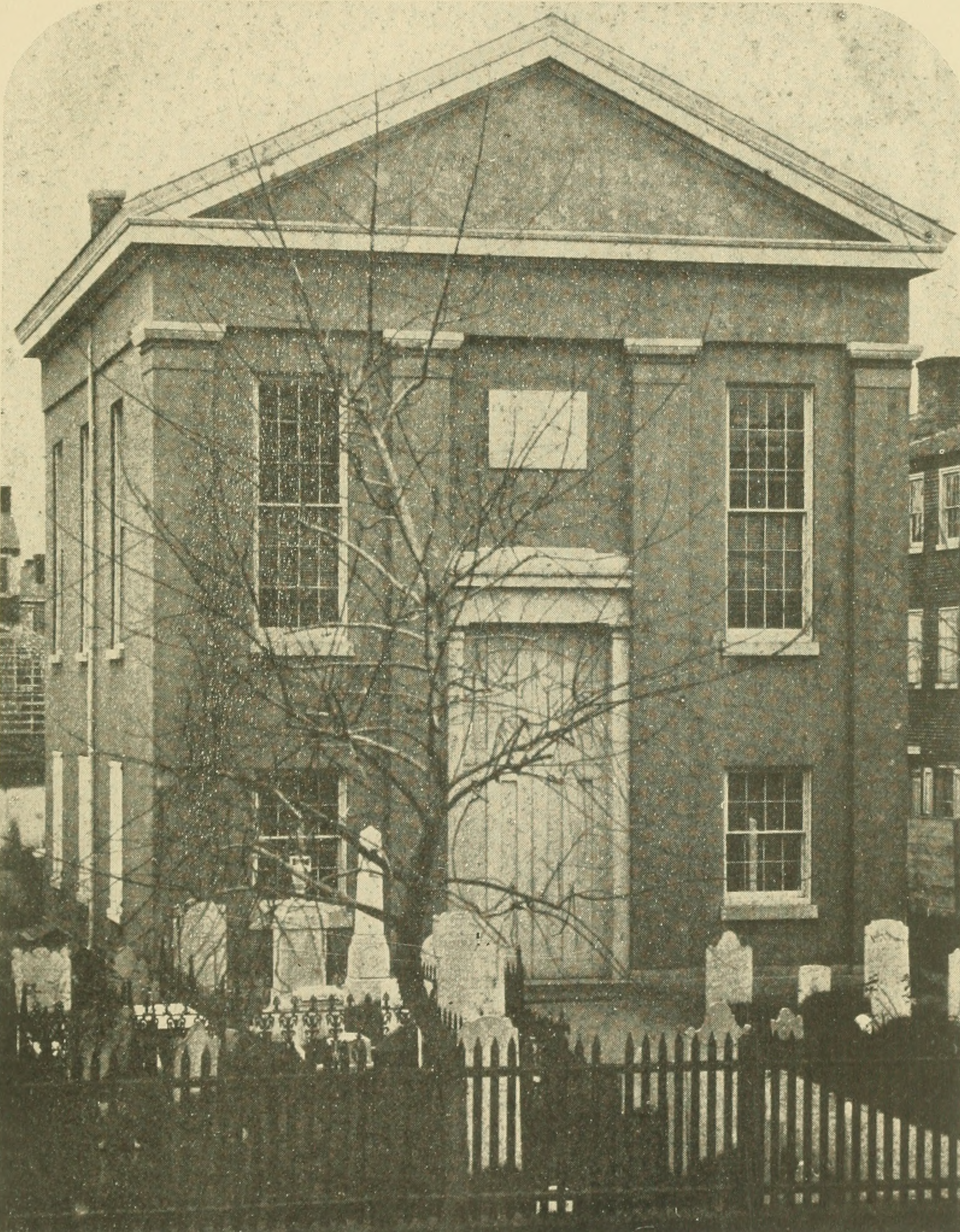
Chapel of the Philadelphia Bible Christian Church, erected in 1845

The church's message was later preached in the United States, as 41 members under the leadership of the Reverend William Metcalfe and the Reverend James Clark (Note: Clark's surname was also spelled Clarke.) (1778–1826) crossed the Atlantic in 1817 and formed the Philadelphia Bible Christian Church. These members later provided a nucleus for the American vegetarian movement and the American Vegetarian Society.

== Beliefs ==
Bible Christians supported independence of mind and freedom of belief, stating that they did not presume "to exercise any dominion over the faith or conscience of men". They believed in free will and had a Pelagian approach. They argued that religion, when properly understood, reveals the same truth to all men. There was no emphasis on original sin or conversion. Man was not saved by faith alone but by his actions and the value of his life as a whole. Vegetarianism formed part of this belief. Cowherd is said to have stated: "...If God had meant us to eat meat, then it would have come to us in edible form 'as is the ripened fruit'".

== See also ==
- Christian vegetarianism
- History of vegetarianism
- Vegetarianism in the Victorian era
- Vegetarianism in the United Kingdom
- Vegetarianism in the United States
- Temperance movement in the United Kingdom
