= A. O. Broadley =

English minister and activist (1868–1939)

The Reverend A. O. Broadley
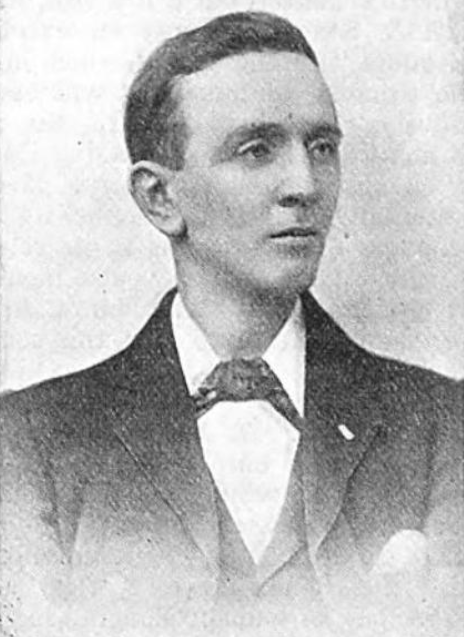
- Broadley in 1898
- Born: Alfred Owen Broadley; 7 July 1868; Greetland, Yorkshire
- Died: 25 April 1939 (aged 70); Dover, England
- Occupations: Unitarian minister; engraver
- Known for: Vegetarianism and anti-vivisection activism

Alfred Owen Broadley (7 July 1868 – 25 April 1939) was an English Unitarian minister and engraver known for his vegetarianism and anti-vivisection activism.

== Biography ==
=== Early life ===
Alfred Owen Broadley was born on 7 July 1868 in Greetland, Yorkshire, to Owen and Elizabeth Broadley. He was baptised on 6 September at St Thomas, Greetland.

=== Career ===
Broadley began his minister career with the Bible Christian Church at Salford from 1905 to 1917. He was assistant preacher to James Clark at Cross Lane Church in Salford. He worked as an engraver at Broad Oak Printworks. He was appointed minister at Haliwell Road Unitarian Church in Bolton from 1918 to 1922. He was minister of the Free Christian Church in Leicester and of Dover Unitarian Church from 1933 to 1939.

=== Vegetarianism ===
Broadley became a vegetarian through S. A. Birtwell. He joined the Vegetarian Society in 1894 and became their lecturer in 1897. He advocated for a vegetarian diet consisting of whole bread, nuts, soups, omelettes, coffee and fruit.

In 1912, Broadley was a speaker at Vegetarian Society meeting in Plymouth with Alfred B. Olsen and Robert H. Perks. He commented that he had been a vegetarian for 21 years which had made him a happier man without visit to a doctor. He also lectured on "Vegetarianism and the Higher Life", expounding the thesis that "any relationship to living creatures not based upon love, is contrary to conscience and will of God".

Broadley conducted the memorial service for William E. A. Axon's funeral at St Paul's Church, Kersal Moor in January 1913. He was a delegate of the Vegetarian Society to the Fourth Congress of the International Vegetarian Union in June 1913.

=== Anti-vivisection ===
Broadley was an opponent of vivisection. In 1923, he attended an anti-vivisection meeting with members from the British Union for the Abolition of Vivisection in Preston.

=== Death ===
Broadley died on 25 April 1939 from a heart attack at his residence in Dover, aged 70. His funeral was held at St James's Cemetery.
