= S. A. Birtwell =

English vegetarianism activist (c. 1844–1897)

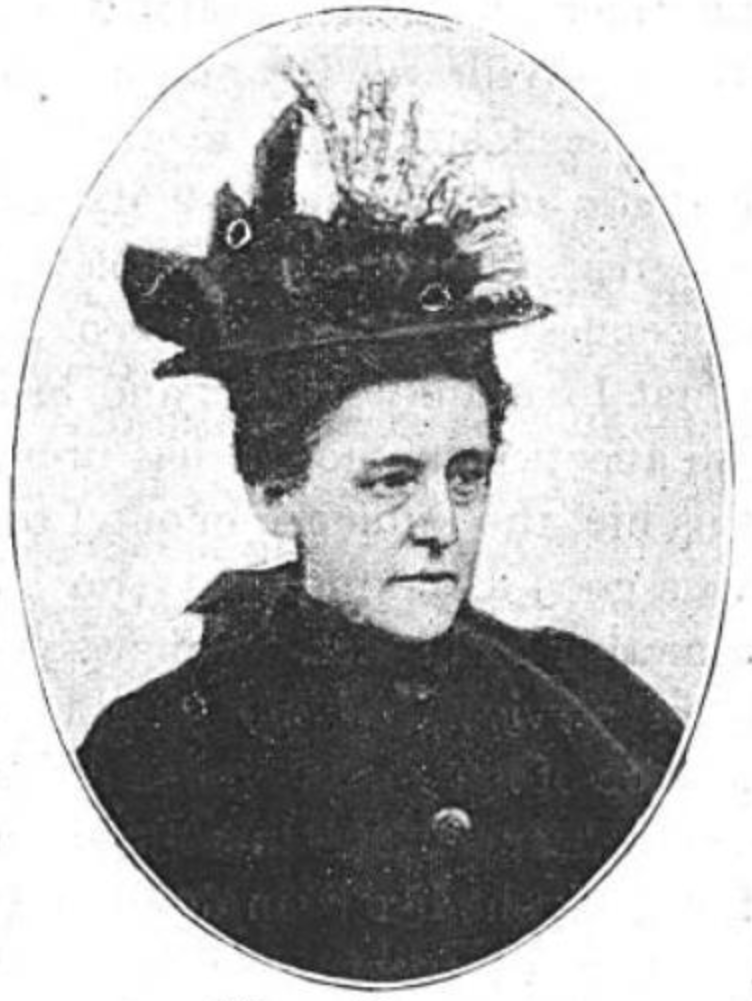
- Birtwell, from an obituary in The Vegetarian Messenger
- Born: Sarah Ann Harrison c. 1844; Accrington, England
- Died: 20 February 1897 (aged 53); Manchester, England
- Resting place: Southern Cemetery, Manchester
- Occupation: Vegetarianism activist
- Organization: Vegetarian Society
- Spouse: Thomas Birtwell (m. 1865; died 1884)
- Children: 1
- Relatives: William Harrison (brother); Hannah Harrison (sister-in-law)

Sarah Ann Birtwell (née Harrison; c. 1844 – 20 February 1897) was an English vegetarianism activist. She was a member of the Vegetarian Society and the sister of its treasurer, William Harrison.

== Biography ==
Birtwell was born Sarah Ann Harrison in Accrington, Lancashire, around 1844. She was baptised on 28 July 1844 at St Leonard's Church, Downham. Her parents were William Harrison, a butcher, and Mary Harrison. Her older brother, William Harrison, later served as treasurer of the Vegetarian Society.

In 1865, she married Thomas Birtwell in Haslingden. By 1881, her husband was working as a cotton weaver and living in Rishton, Lancashire, where she was recorded as a cotton winder. They had one son, Joseph, who later worked in a printworks. Thomas died in 1884.

Birtwell and her son were listed as residents of Accrington when they joined the Vegetarian Society in 1889. Charles W. Forward's Fifty Years of Food Reform stated that Birtwell spent much of her time promoting vegetarianism and that she gained converts to the movement, including Albert Broadbent and A. O. Broadley.

Birtwell died at Plymouth Grove, Manchester, on 20 February 1897, aged 53. She was buried at Southern Cemetery on 23 February. At her funeral, conducted by the Reverend James Clark, Henry Pitman attended on behalf of the Vegetarian Society, and Mrs. Redfern represented the Accrington Congregational Church, of which Birtwell was a member.

== See also ==
- History of vegetarianism
- Women and vegetarianism and veganism advocacy
- Women in the Victorian era
- Vegetarianism in the United Kingdom
- Vegetarianism in the Victorian era
