= William Harrison (vegetarian) =

English industrialist, activist, and writer (1836–1914)

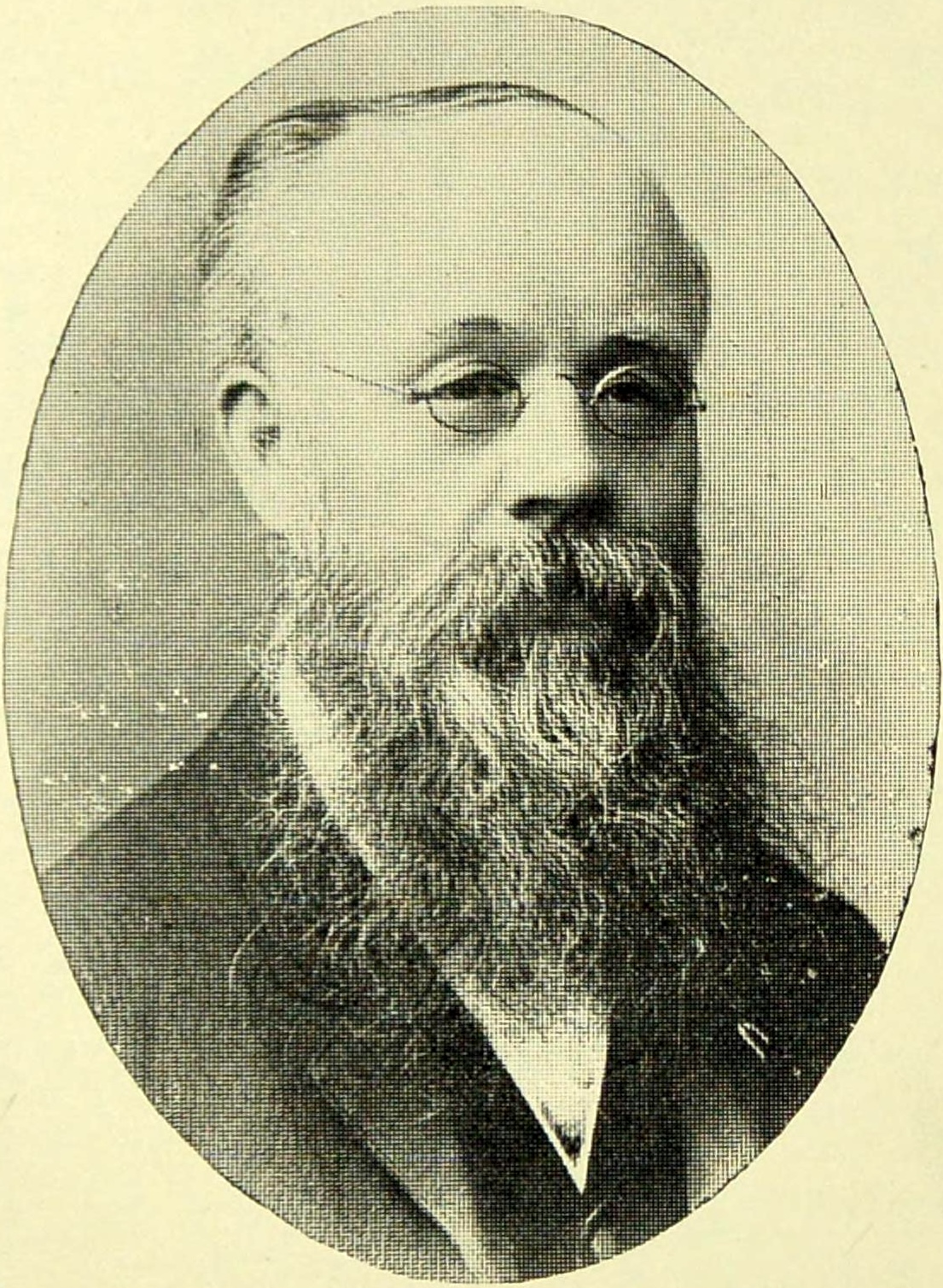
- Harrison in Fifty Years of Food Reform (1898)
- Born: Downham, Lancashire, England
- Baptised: 1 May 1836
- Died: 15 July 1914 (aged 78); Manchester, England
- Resting place: Manchester Crematorium
- Occupations: Industrialist; activist; writer
- Organizations: Vegetarian Society (treasurer); Theistic Church; Bible Christian Church
- Known for: Knitting machinery and vegetarianism activism
- Spouses: Elizabeth Harrison; Hannah Bussey
- Children: 6
- Relatives: Sarah Ann Birtwell (sister); Albert Broadbent (son-in-law)

William Harrison (bapt. 1 May 1836 – 15 July 1914) was an English industrialist, activist, and writer. He owned a knitting machinery firm in Manchester and was involved in the knitting industry. Harrison adopted vegetarianism in 1878 and served as treasurer of the Vegetarian Society from 1891 until his death. He was connected with the Theistic Church in London and the Bible Christian Church in Salford.

== Biography ==
=== Early life ===
William Harrison was born in Downham, Lancashire, and baptised on 1 May 1836 at St Leonard's Church. He was the son of William Harrison, a butcher, and Mary Harrison. He came from a family of butchers of several generations. He was the brother of Sarah Ann Birtwell, who later joined the Vegetarian Society.

=== Career ===
Harrison began work at the age of five. He arrived in Manchester in his youth with 4¾d to his name. In 1856, he established the Harrison Patent Knitting Machine Company. The company published early black-and-white photographic advertisements in 1887 in The Parrot. It was incorporated in 1894 and received a Grand Prix gold medal at the Franco-British Exhibition in 1908.

According to historian James Gregory, Harrison treated his employees as equals. He provided an organ for use by employees, and female staff were reported to end the working day with music and singing.

=== Vegetarianism activism ===
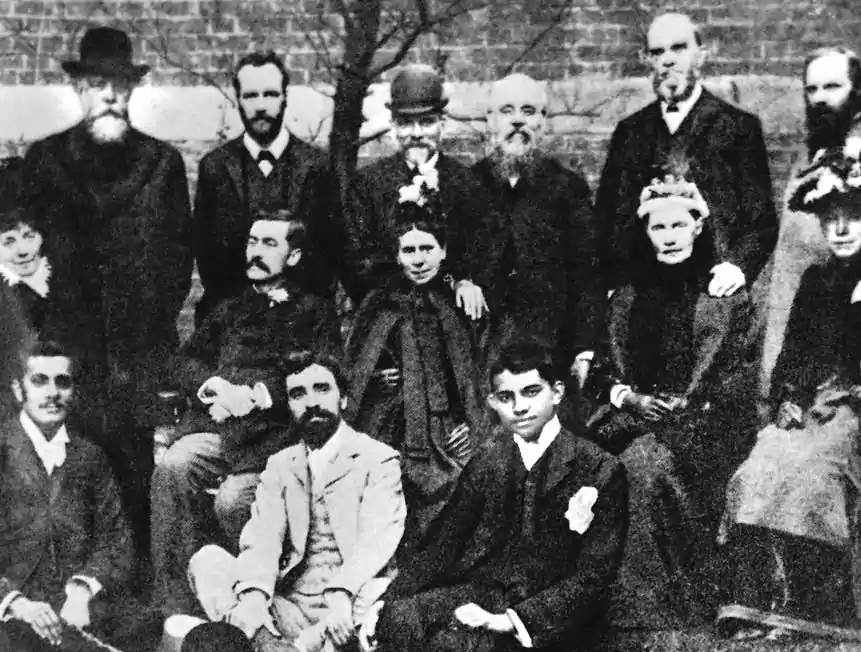
Harrison (back row, third from right) and his wife (centre) at a London Vegetarian Society meeting, 1891

Harrison adopted vegetarianism in 1878, stating that it improved his health, including symptoms of bronchitis. He joined the executive of the Vegetarian Society in 1882.

Harrison had earlier been associated with temperance and philanthropic organisations. Charles W. Forward wrote that Harrison's speeches were received favourably because of his earnestness and sincerity, rather than because of conventional oratorical skill.

Harrison advocated the establishment of a vegetarian restaurant to show the diet in practice and to support charitable work. He proposed that profits should fund meals for the poor in London and other cities, and helped form a consultative and co-operative committee in London to oversee the project.

From 1891 until his death, Harrison served as treasurer of the Vegetarian Society. He wrote on vegetarianism for magazines, and several of his writings were also issued separately. He was also the proprietor of vegetarian restaurants.

In September 1901, Harrison and other English delegates attended the St Louis International Vegetarian Congress during the Louisiana Purchase Exposition. The group was hosted by vegetarian societies in Philadelphia and New York. In August 1908, Harrison attended the International Vegetarian Congress at Dresden.

=== Personal life and death ===
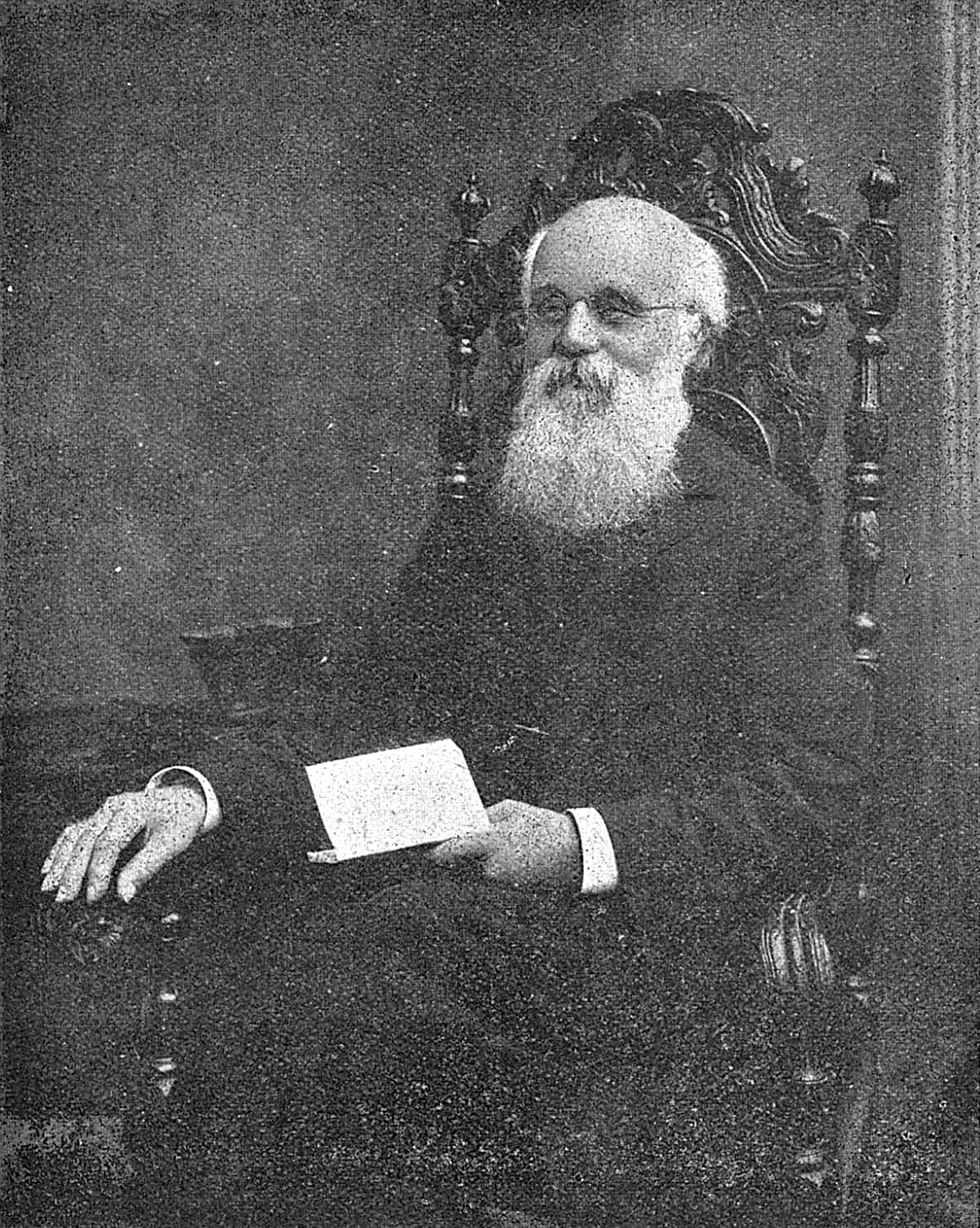
Harrison, from an obituary in The Vegetarian

Harrison was married twice. His first wife, Elizabeth, was born in Scotland around 1833. They had four sons and two daughters. Albert Broadbent, a fellow vegetarian activist, was married to his daughter Christina.

Harrison's second wife, Hannah (née Bussey), was born in Norwich in 1840. She was also a vegetarian and trained employees in vegetarian cookery. A member of the Vegetarian Society from 1884, she gave cookery demonstrations in Manchester and authored papers including "Hints to Housewives and Caterers" and "Woman's Mission in Vegetarianism".

Harrison was connected with the Theistic Church in London, as well as the Bible Christian Church in Salford.

Harrison died on 15 July 1914 at his home in Plymouth Grove, Manchester, aged 78. A service was held at the Manchester Crematorium on 18 July and was attended by family members, more than 50 employees from his firm, and representatives of vegetarian and temperance organisations.

== Publications ==
- A Voice That Speaks to Preachers of Righteousness: The Rev. John Wesley a Vegetarian (Manchester Vegetarian Society, 1903)
- Bible Testimony Against Flesh Eating (Manchester Vegetarian Society, 1907)
- The Food That Eden Knew (Manchester Vegetarian Society, c. 1910)

== See also ==
- Christian vegetarianism
- History of vegetarianism
- Vegetarianism in the Victorian era
- Vegetarianism in the United Kingdom
- Temperance movement in the United Kingdom
