= Georges Danjou =

French physician (1862–1926)

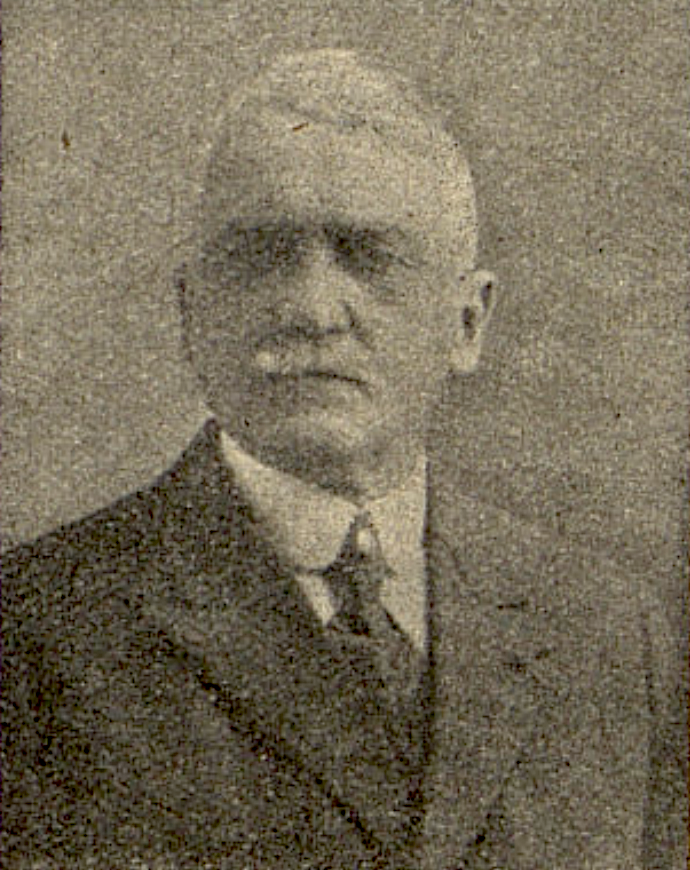
- Danjou, from an obituary
- Born: François Jules Georges Danjou; 17 June 1862; Limoux, Aude, France
- Died: 12 May 1926 (aged 63); 14th arrondissement of Paris, France
- Resting place: Fougax-et-Barrineuf, France
- Education: University of Paris Faculty of Medicine; Royal Central Gymnastics Institute
- Occupations: Physician; physiotherapist; military doctor; writer; activist
- Spouses: Marie Louise Scheppers (m. 1902)
- Military career
- Allegiance: France
- Branch: French Armed Forces Health Service
- Rank: Lieutenant colonel
- Conflicts: World War I; Macedonian front
- Awards: Legion of Honour; Croix de Guerre 1914–1918

François Jules Georges Danjou (17 June 1862 – 12 May 1926) was a French physician, physiotherapist, military doctor, writer, and vegetarianism activist. He received the Legion of Honour and the Croix de Guerre 1914–1918 for his military medical service. He served as president of the French Vegetarian Society and proposed the creation of an International Vegetarian Federation, which led to the founding of the International Vegetarian Union.

== Biography ==
=== Early life and education ===
François Jules Georges Danjou was born in Limoux, Aude, on 17 June 1862. His parents were Jean Danjou and Célina Merliac. He grew up in a small village described by Philippe Tissié as having a history of gold and iron working.

Danjou was educated at the College of Foix. He later studied at the University of Paris Faculty of Medicine. In 1887, he defended a medical thesis on deforming osteoarthropathies in congenital syphilis for his M.D. degree.

=== Military medical career ===
After completing his medical studies, Danjou joined the French military as a doctor. Early in his career, he served at the Val-de-Grâce military hospital. During this period, he became a member of the Decoeur Mission. According to Tissié, Danjou contracted a severe purulent ophthalmia while treating Bambara people, and his sight remained weakened after 18 months of treatment.

Danjou also served in the Second Franco-Dahomean War. He assembled an ethnographic collection of 341 Dahomey items, including weapons, clothing, votive pottery, jewellery, fetishes, and charms, and donated it to the Society of Anthropology of Paris in 1895.

For his service, Danjou was awarded the Legion of Honour and transferred to the reserve of the active army.

=== Civilian medical career and activism ===
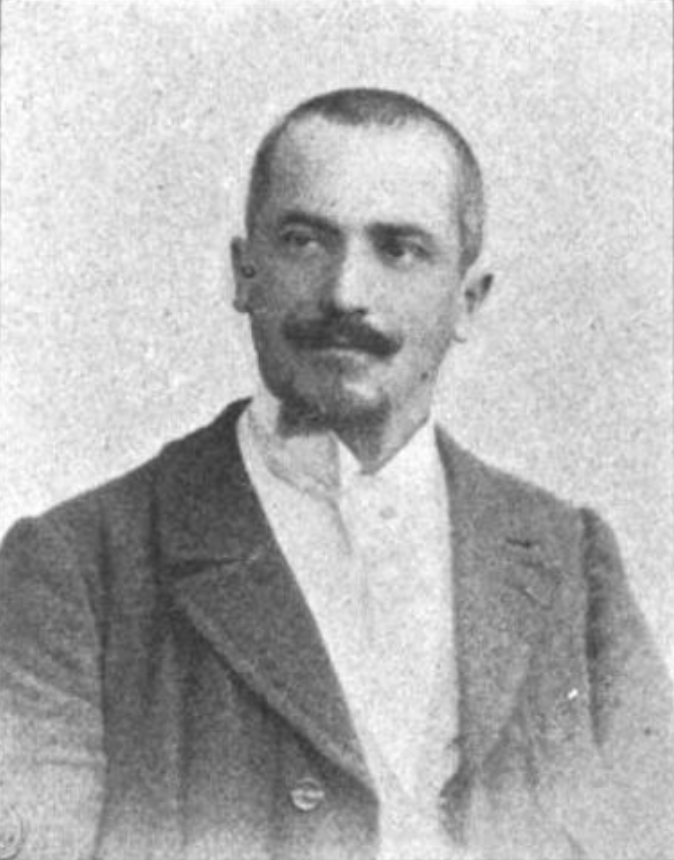
Danjou, c. 1899

After leaving active military service, Danjou qualified as a sanitary physician and began working as a ship's doctor. He advocated maritime health reforms, but later resigned from the post.

Danjou then worked on physical education and physiotherapy. He travelled to Stockholm, Sweden, where he studied at the Royal Central Gymnastics Institute. After returning to France, he criticised practices in French physical and medical education.

Danjou was also an advocate for vegetarianism. He served as president of the French Vegetarian Society and proposed the creation of an International Vegetarian Federation at an international meeting of the society in 1907. The proposal led to the creation of the International Vegetarian Union. He also founded a vegetarian group in Nice and a Catalonian vegetarian society.

=== World War I service ===
At the outbreak of World War I, Danjou volunteered for mobilisation. He initially served in the trenches of the Argonne and was later deployed to the Armée d'Orient. He took part in the retreat from Serbia, including during temperatures described by Tissié as falling to −20 °C (−4 °F).

During the campaign, Danjou contracted malaria near the Vardar River. He continued to serve in Greece, where he organised a hospital camp for French soldiers.

For his service, Danjou was promoted to lieutenant colonel, awarded the Croix de Guerre 1914–1918, and made an Officer of the Legion of Honour.

=== Later life ===
After the war, Danjou had difficulty re-establishing his civilian medical career in Nice. He continued to attend medical and public health conferences in France and argued for changes in medical and public health practice.

=== Personal life and death ===
In 1902, Danjou married Marie Louise Scheppens in Aude.

Danjou died on 12 May 1926 in the 14th arrondissement of Paris, aged 63. Tissié wrote that his death was suspected to have resulted from complications of malaria. Danjou was buried at Fougax-et-Barrineuf on 17 May. A bronze plaque with a sculpture by Grégoire Calvet was placed on his tomb.

== Publications ==
- Danjou, G. (1905). L'Oeuvre de régénération sociale poursuivie par l'Association nationale de préparation des jeunes gens au service militaire, conférence faite, le 3 mai 1905, au palais de la Jetée-Promenade à Nice, par le Dr G. Danjou [The work of social regeneration pursued by the National Association for the Preparation of Young Men for Military Service, lecture given on 3 May 1905 at the Palais de la Jetée-Promenade in Nice, by Dr G. Danjou] (in French).
- Danjou, G. (1909). Radioactivité des eaux thermales de L'Echaillon à Saint-Jean-de-Maurienne [Radioactivity of the thermal waters of L'Echaillon at Saint-Jean-de-Maurienne] (in French).
- Danjou, G. (1913). L'Éducation physique de la femme [The physical education of women] (in French). Paris.
