= Hannah Harrison =

English vegetarianism activist (1840–1922)

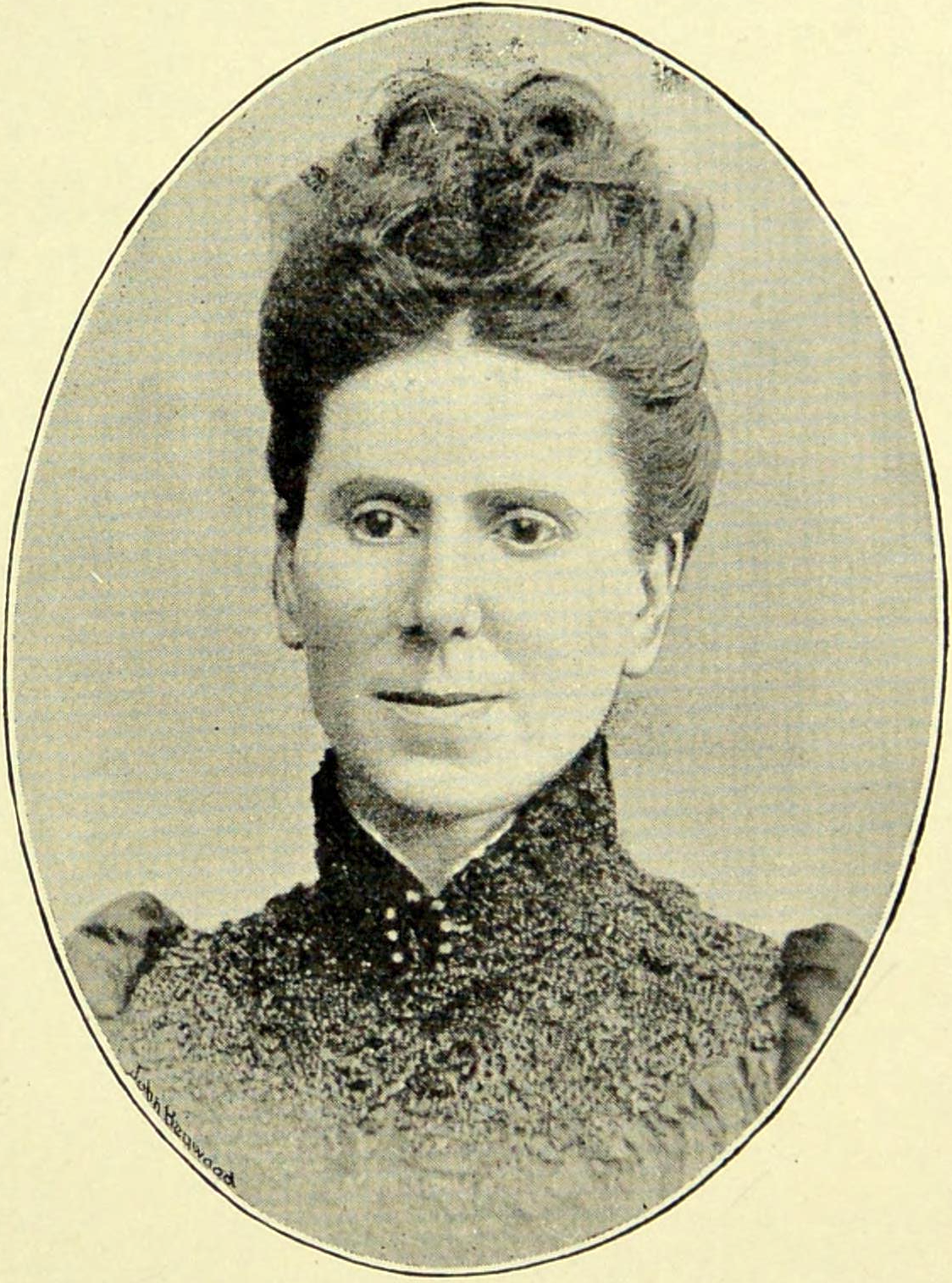
- Harrison in Fifty Years of Food Reform (1898)
- Born: Hannah Bussey; 1840; Norwich, England
- Died: 2 September 1922 (aged 82); Manchester, England
- Occupation: Vegetarianism activist
- Spouse: William Harrison (died 1914)
- Relatives: Sarah Ann Birtwell (sister-in-law); Albert Broadbent (son-in-law)

Hannah Harrison (née Bussey; 1840 – 2 September 1922) was an English vegetarianism activist. Born in Norwich, she joined the Vegetarian Society in 1884 and gave vegetarian cookery demonstrations in Manchester. She also wrote papers for The Vegetarian Messenger. She was married to William Harrison, a Bible Christian and treasurer of the Vegetarian Society.

== Biography ==
Harrison was born Hannah Bussey in Norwich in 1840. She married William Harrison, a member of the Bible Christian Church in Salford, who owned a knitting firm and was a treasurer of the Vegetarian Society.

She became a member of the Vegetarian Society in 1884. Her activities included cookery demonstrations in Manchester; Charles W. Forward wrote that these drew attention to the practical side of vegetarianism. James Gregory states that Harrison trained workers in vegetarian cookery. Her papers included "Hints to Housewives and Caterers" and "Woman's Mission in Vegetarianism", both published in The Vegetarian Messenger. "Hints to Housewives and Caterers" was later published as a pamphlet by the Vegetarian Society.

In February 1892, The Vegetarian Messenger published a testimony by William Harrison, in which he described adopting a vegetarian diet after suffering from headaches, stomach aches and bronchitis. Marzena Kubisz writes that a later letter by Hannah Harrison said that her adoption of vegetarianism was connected with the effect of her husband's improved health and with religious motives.

William Harrison died in 1914. Harrison died at Plymouth Grove, Manchester, on 2 September 1922, aged 82.

== Publications ==
- "Woman's Mission in Vegetarianism". The Vegetarian Messenger. 2 (7): 183–185. Summer 1888.
- "Hints to Housewives and Caterers". The Vegetarian Messenger. c. 1891.
- Hints to Housewives and Caterers. Manchester: Vegetarian Society. c. 1900.

== See also ==
- Bible Christian Church
- History of vegetarianism
- Vegetarianism in the Victorian era
- Vegetarianism in the United Kingdom
- Women and vegetarianism and veganism advocacy
