= Isabel Wilson (vegetarian) =

English vegetarianism activist (1908–1994)

Isabel Wilson MBE
- Wilson, from an obituary
- Born: Isabel Lunt; 1908; Didsbury, Manchester, England
- Died: 25 December 1994 (aged 86); Kendal, Cumbria, England
- Other names: Isabel James; Isabel James Wilson
- Education: University of Manchester
- Occupations: Vegetarianism activist; cookery writer; guesthouse proprietor; local councillor
- Organization: Vegetarian Society (president)
- Spouses: William Stanley James (m. 1937, died): Andrew Wilson
- Children: 2
- Awards: Member of the Order of the British Empire (1992)

Isabel Wilson MBE (née Lunt; 1908 – 25 December 1994) was an English vegetarianism activist, cookery writer, guesthouse proprietor and local councillor. Raised in a vegetarian family, she ran vegetarian guesthouses in the Lake District for about 30 years, chaired the Vegetarian Catering Association and the Food and Cookery Section of the Vegetarian Society, and served as president of the society from 1987 to 1989. She also wrote Vegetarian Cuisine (1967) and gave cookery demonstrations across Britain. Wilson served on Westmorland County Council and Cumbria County Council, and campaigned against heavy goods traffic through the Lake District. She was appointed a Member of the Order of the British Empire (MBE) in 1992 for services to the public and the community in Cumbria.

== Early life and family ==
Wilson was born Isabel Lunt in Didsbury, Manchester, in 1908. She grew up in a vegetarian family. Her father was H. Julius Lunt, whose firm of solicitors acted for the Vegetarian Society for many years, and her mother was Edith Lunt (née North). She obtained an arts degree from the University of Manchester and later worked in London.

While holidaying in Somerset in 1936, she met William Stanley James, known as Jimmy, who was also active in the vegetarian movement. They married in 1937 and had two children, Wendy and Brian. James died before Wilson's second marriage. In 1977, she met Andrew Wilson while campaigning in Grasmere. They later married.

== Vegetarian catering and activism ==
Following her marriage to James, the couple took over Beck Allans, a vegetarian guesthouse in the Lake District previously run by Fay Henderson. They later moved to Rothay Bank, a larger house that they also operated as a vegetarian guesthouse. Wilson cited the difficulties vegetarians faced when travelling as one reason for running such a business. She spent about 30 years operating vegetarian guesthouses.

Wilson became involved in the Vegetarian Catering Association, which developed from the Vegetarian Guest House Association founded in 1953. She became chairperson of the association in 1969. When it was succeeded by the Vegetarian Society's Food and Cookery Section, she continued giving talks and cookery demonstrations around Britain. She became chairperson of the section in 1985.

A vegetarian class was introduced at the biennial professional Salon Culinaire at Hotelympia in the early 1950s. Wilson won bronze medals in 1954 and 1956, followed by a gold medal in 1958. She became a judge at the competition in 1964.

Wilson served on the committee of the Manchester Vegetarian Society and later on that of the Vegetarian Society of the United Kingdom. Following the amalgamation of the Vegetarian Society and the London Vegetarian Society in 1968, she joined the council of the combined society. She was its president from 1987 to 1989 and was made an honorary fellow. She also attended several world vegetarian congresses and was regional secretary for Europe of the International Vegetarian Union for a period.

Her cookbook Vegetarian Cuisine was published by the Vegetarian Society in 1967.

== Lake District work ==
Wilson entered local government in 1968, saying that she wanted to help protect the Lake District landscape. She was a member of Westmorland County Council and, following local government reorganisation, Cumbria County Council. She also sat on committees concerned with the protection and management of the Lake District.

Wilson campaigned for restrictions on heavy goods traffic through the Lake District National Park. She helped organise an overnight lorry count to establish the volume of traffic passing through the park. The campaign continued for about ten years, after which restrictions were introduced on lorries using the main road through the park.

Wilson and her second husband, Andrew, also promoted the Lake District through a newspaper and guidebooks. Following her retirement, she took up painting, producing landscapes of the area.

== Honours and death ==
Wilson was appointed a Member of the Order of the British Empire in the 1992 Birthday Honours for services to the public and the community in Cumbria.

She died at Westmorland General Hospital in Kendal, Cumbria, on 25 December 1994, aged 86. Her funeral was held at Lancaster and Morecambe Crematorium on 30 December.

== Selected publications ==
- Vegetarian Cuisine. Vegetarian Society. 1967.
