= Gordon Latto =

Gordon Latto is the name of:

- Gordon Latto (doctor) (1911–1998), Scottish doctor, nutritionist and vegetarian
- Gordon Latto (ice hockey) (born 1958), Scottish ice hockey player
