= J. P. Sandlands =

English clergyman and naturopath

The Reverend J. P. Sandlands
- Born: John Poole Sandlands; 1838; Dawley, Shropshire, England
- Died: 30 January 1915 (aged 76–77); Brigstock, Northamptonshire, England
- Education: Trinity College Dublin (B.A., 1860; M.A., 1863)
- Occupations: Clergyman, naturopath
- Spouse: Janet Pitcairn Simpson (m. 1869)
- Children: 2, including Paul Sandlands

John Poole Sandlands (1838 – 30 January 1915) was an English clergyman, naturopath and vegetarianism activist.

== Biography ==
Sandlands was born in Dawley, Shropshire, one of the nine children of John Sandlands, a saddler, and Mary Ann his wife.

After initially working as a school master (recorded in the 1861 census), he was further educated at Lichfield College and Trinity College Dublin where he obtained his B.A. (1860) and M.A. (1863). He was the curate of St. Luke's, Hanley (1866–1869) and vicar of Brigstock, Northamptonshire (1869–1873). He resided in the vicarage at St. Andrew's Church. He was considered an authority on public speaking and voice production.

He married Janet Pitcairn Simpson in 1869 and they had two children; their second child was Paul Sandlands. Sandlands died when he fell down the stairs at his vicarage in 1915. In Brigstock, two roads are named after Sandlands: Sandlands Avenue and Sandlands Close.

== Naturopathy ==
At his vicarage, Sandlands developed a naturopathic sanatorium to which patients came from all over the world. Sandlands denied the existence of germs and believed that disease was caused by "unwholesome food". He advised his patients to never take medicine and held the view that cancer could be cured by eating natural foods such as fruit and nuts. His claims about curing cancer were criticized in The Lancet journal. Sandlands was a non-smoker, teetotaller and vegetarian who opposed the consumption of white bread.

In 1903, Sandlands wrote a rebuttal to Albert Broadbent's diet that recommended plasmon, entitled Science in the Daily Meal Criticised: Or Plasmon Confounded.

== Selected publications ==
- The Voice of Public Speaking (1879)
- How to Develop General Vocal Power (1886)
- How to Be Well: Or the Principles of Health (1896)
- Fallacies in Present-Day Thought (1902)
- Natural Food (1902)
- Sanitation Personal and Public (1902)
- "Science in the Daily Meal" Criticised, Or Plasmon Confounded (1903)
- Corpulence, A Case and Cure: Or Why Grow Fat? (1903)
- Health: A Royal Road to It (1909)
