= Frank Wokes =

English biochemist and nutritionist (1892–1974)

- Born: February 1, 1892; West Derby, England
- Died: April 1, 1974 (aged 82); Dacorum, England
- Education: UCL School of Pharmacy; University of Liverpool
- Occupations: Biochemist, nutritionist

Frank Wokes (1 February 1892 – 1 April 1974) was an English biochemist, nutritionist and vegetarianism activist known for his research on the nutritional aspects of Vitamin B12 and Vitamin B12 deficiency. He was an early advocate of food fortification.

== Career ==
Wokes was born on 1 February 1892 in Liverpool. His father was Thomas Siminson Wokes of Grassendale.

He qualified at the London School of Pharmacy in 1914 and studied biochemistry and nutrition at the University of Liverpool. He served with the Vegetarian Field and Ambulance Unit during World War I. He was assistant biochemist and pharmacologist at the UCL School of Pharmacy from 1927 to 1940. He obtained a London doctorate in 1938 for his research into hormones and vitamins.

Wokes was director of research at Ovaltine Research Laboratory (1941–1959) and at the Vegetarian Nutritional Research Centre. He was a member of the Royal Society of Medicine, Royal Institute of Chemistry and the British Pharmacological Society. He toured India at the age of 77 and worked with Government officials, Universities and Research Institutes.

== Vegetarian research ==
Wokes was a life-long vegetarian having been born to a vegetarian family. In 1959, he established the Vegetarian Nutritional Research Centre at Stanborough Park, near Watford. Wokes collaborated with the Vegetarian Society to provide nutritional evidence for the benefits of vegetarian diets. The Centre was eventually incorporated into the Vegetarian Society. At the centre he conducted experiments on plant alternatives to cow's milk.

In 1968, Wokes co-founded the journal Plant Foods for Human Nutrition. In 1974, it was described as an "international journal devoted to the role of plant foods in human nutrition and designed to discuss methods of dealing with the problem of world food shortage."

Wokes authored over one hundred scientific papers on nutrition, some of which were on Vitamin B12. He was consulted by the war time Minister of Food. In 1941, he authored Food: The Deciding Factor which sold over 50,000 copies and converted many to vegetarianism. In his later life, Wokes became a vegan. He was a vice-president of the Vegan Society.

He attended the 18th World Vegetarian Congress in 1965 and applied as a member to form their Science Council.

== Vitamin B12 research ==
The deficiency of Vitamin B12 which may occur in vegans was first described by Wokes to the International Congress of Nutrition in Amsterdam in 1954. Wokes and the Vegetarian Nutritional Research Centre took interest in studying the health of vegans in India as they were marked with Vitamin B12 deficiency more than vegetarians consuming dairy products. In the 1960s, Wokes found that serum B12 levels in vegans were much lower than the average levels in vegetarians and meat-eaters. He did not oppose Vitamin B12 injections but suggested that a more efficient and inexpensive method for vegans to get Vitamin B12 was from suitable fortified foods.

== Family ==
Wokes married Gladys Winifred Gale in September 1930. They had two children. His brother A. Wokes and his wife from Woodhall were vice-presidents of the Lincolnshire Vegetarian Society.

== Selected publications ==
- A Textbook of Applied Biochemistry for Pharmacists and Pharmaceutical Students (1937)
- A Strict Vegetarian Diet (1938)
- Food: The Deciding Factor (1941)
- The Chemical Estimation of Nicotinic Acid in Cereals and Other Foods (with Eirene M. Janes and F. W. Norris, 1947)
- Vitamin C in Potatoes (with Gordon Nunn, 1948)
- The Direct Use of Plant Materials by Man (1952)
- Human Dietary Deficiency of Vitamin B12 (1955)
- The Role of Vitamin B12 in Human Nutrition (with C. W. Picard, 1955)
- Some Nutritional Aspects of Vitamin B12 (1958)
- Dietary Deficiency in Vitamin B12 (1960)
- The Treatment of Dietary Deficiency of Vitamin B12 with Vegetable Protein Foods (with F. R. Ellis, 1967)
