= W. J. Monk =

English clergyman and activist (1820 – 1896)

The Reverend W. J. Monk
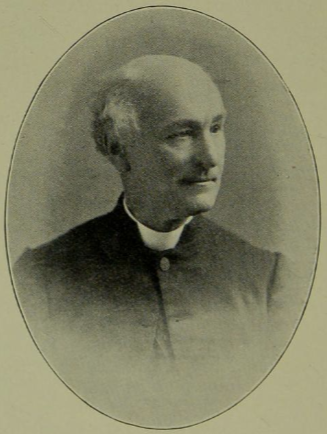
- Portrait from Fifty Years of Food Reform (1898)
- Born: William John Monk c. 1820; Kent, England
- Died: 10 July 1896 (aged 76); Doddington, England
- Education: University of Cambridge (BA, 1842; MA, 1857)
- Occupations: Clergyman, activist
- Spouses: Alice Pickup (m. 1852, died) W. Gardner (m. 1857)

William John Monk (c. 1820 – 10 July 1896) was an English clergyman and activist for vegetarianism and temperance. He was a vice-president of the Vegetarian Society.

== Life and career ==
Monk was born in Kent around 1820. He obtained his BA in 1842 and MA in 1857 from the University of Cambridge. He became an ordained deacon in 1843 in Chester and priest in 1844.

Monk was the curate at Christ Church, Preston (1843–1845), Walton-le-Dale (1846–1847), Blackburn (1850–1853), Great Grimsby (1853–1858), St Alphege, Canterbury (1859–1863), Chartham, Kent (1863–1871) and vicar of Doddington (1872–1896).

Monk suffered from indigestion and became a teetotaller in 1876. In 1878, Monk commented "I am now a strict vegetarian, living on farinaceous food, fruit and vegetables. I drink nothing, not even water, a little milk and oatmeal porridge suffices for breakfast–butter and eggs I seldom touch". He was chairman and a speaker at Vegetarian Society meetings where he argued that vegetarianism is not a costly practice and that people could do well on a diet that contained no animal flesh.

Monk was President of the National Food Reform Society which later became the Vegetarian Society's London Auxiliary. He resigned in 1888. Monk was also a vice-president of the Anti-Narcotic League and the Vegetarian Society for many years. He was on the committee of the East Kent Branch of the Royal Society for the Prevention of Cruelty to Animals. He was on the council of the United Kingdom Alliance and was secretary of the Canterbury Church of England Temperance Society.

== Personal life and death ==
Monk married Alice Pickup in 1852, after her death he married Mary Catharine Gardner in St Nicholas, Ash, Kent 1857. He died on 10 July 1896 at Doddington Vicarage, aged 76. His death was caused by a malignant growth.
