= Ole Andres Olsen =

- General Conference President
- Ole A. Olsen, 8th President of the General Conference of Seventh-day Adventists.
- In office: 1888-97
- Predecessor: George Ide Butler
- Successor: George A. Irwin

Personal details
- Born: July 28, 1845 Skogen, Songdalen, Kristiansand, Norway
- Died: January 29, 1915 (aged 69)
- Denomination: Seventh-day Adventist
- Occupation: Minister and administrator
- Education: Battle Creek College

Ole Andres Olsen (28 July 1845 – 29 January 1915) was a Seventh-day Adventist minister and administrator. who served as the General Conference president of the Seventh-day Adventist church organization globally from 1888 to 1897.

== Biography ==
Born in Skogen, in Songdalen near Kristiansand, Norway, Olsen emigrated to the United States to Wisconsin at the age of five. By the age of nine, his parents had begun to keep the seventh-day Sabbath. He was baptized in 1858. From 1876 to 1877 he attended school at Battle Creek College (now Andrews University). In 1869 the Wisconsin Conference granted him a ministerial license. On 2 June 1873, he was ordained as a minister. The following year he was elected president of the Wisconsin Conference.

In 1868, Olsen married Jennie Nelson. His sons were Alfred B. Olsen and Mahlon Ellsworth Olsen.

At the 1888 General Conference session he was elected president of the General Conference of Seventh-day Adventists. Olsen was the first non-American-born president of this church organization and this is reflected in the global and culturally sensitive approach he took in his presidency. He was also one of the first individuals to advocate the formation of Union Conferences within the Seventh-day Adventist church. He was not reelected as world church president in 1897 and instead became a missionary in South Africa. In 1901 he was asked to head the work of the Seventh-day Adventist church in Great Britain.

Olsen died of a heart attack on 29 January 1915.

== 1888 - 1897, The Olsen Presidency ==
The 1888 General Conference Session elected Olsen as president. However, he was in Europe at the time and did not take on the presidency until May 1889. The 1889 General Conference session, held in October, gave Olsen the opportunity to bring about significant changes and development and turn the Seventh-day Adventist church into a global Protestant religion. Olsen's objectives included addressing administrative concerns as well as implementing a major shift in church structure, accountability, and practices:

Europe: Adventist literature should be translated into the Russian and Spanish languages. There should be more translations of such literature into German. Establish laborers in Turkey, France, Italy, Austria, Holland and Spain. Believers in Scandinavia want and should have, schools established.

Australasia: The Australasian Conference needed a business manager so the leader, Tenny, could do more editing and conference work. Daniells, in New Zealand, needed an assistant. The canvassing work was getting started there and needed to be put on a business footing.

South Africa: For South Africa, a Dutch laborer should go back with Wessels to work among the people of that nationality. There should be tracts in the Nguni languages.

The United States: The work in the Southern United States needed attention. Olsen believed that canvassing, or book sales, would be the most successful type of work in the early years of the work there. Missions in the big American cities should get special help. The Bible school in Chicago deserved the conference's support. In 1889, three Colleges existed to serve the church: Battle Creek in Michigan, South Lancaster in Massachusetts, and Healdsburg in California. Careful consideration should be given to a college in the Mid-West. Olsen recommended that the work in the United States be divided into districts with each one being under the supervision of a member of the General Conference committee. This district superintendent would plan the institutes, camp meetings, general meetings, and other work for the territory. (Olsen, 1889, p. 8) As the meetings progressed, Olsen's recommendation on this became a reality.

Training Institutes: There should be special time-limited schools established for the training of ministers, and the teaching of the Scandinavian, French, and German languages in the United States. Most of these schools were slated to begin in November 1889. Yet, everything that has been started should be improved upon.

Religious Liberty: The recently established National Religious Liberty Association should receive the General Conference Session's endorsement. The GC Session should also develop a plan for circulating Religious Liberty petitions.

These initiatives demonstrate Olsen's comprehensive involvement with the world church.

== See also ==
- General Conference of Seventh-day Adventists
- Seventh-day Adventist Church
- Seventh-day Adventist theology
- Seventh-day Adventist eschatology
- History of the Seventh-day Adventist Church

| Preceded by George Ide Butler | President of the General Conference of Seventh-day Adventists; 1888 - 1897 | Succeeded by George A. Irwin |
