= Gordon Latto (doctor) =

Scottish doctor, nutritionist, naturopath, and activist (1911–1998)

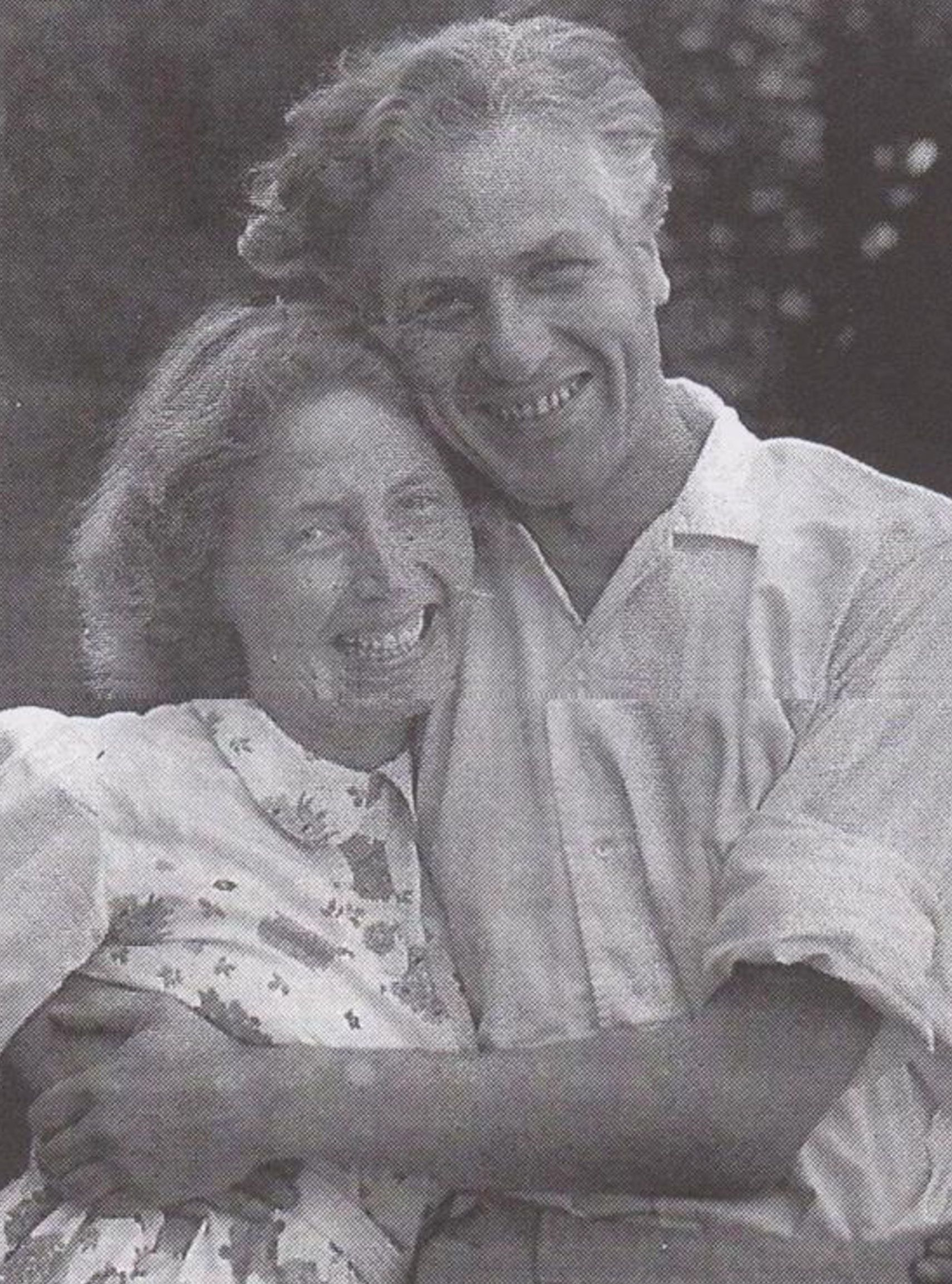
- Latto and his wife Barbara, March 1938
- Born: 26 June 1911; Dundee, Scotland
- Died: 2 September 1998 (aged 87); Reading, England
- Occupations: Doctor, nutritionist, naturopath, activist
- Years active: 1935–1995
- Spouse: Barbara Krebs (m. 1938)
- Children: 5

Gordon Latto (25 June 1911 – 2 September 1998) was a Scottish doctor, nutritionist, naturopath, and advocate for vegetarianism and against vivisection. He served as President of both the Vegetarian Society and International Vegetarian Union.

== Biography ==
Gordon Latto was born on 25 June 1911, in Dundee, Scotland. His father initially served as Deputy Town Clerk in Dundee before being promoted to the position of Town Clerk. Following the conclusion of the First World War, his parents were acquainted with The Order of the Cross and adopted a vegetarian lifestyle soon thereafter. Latto studied at the High School of Dundee, and qualified as a doctor in 1935 at the University of St Andrews.

In 1938, After marrying Barbara Krebs (1911–2000), who was German, the couple toured Germany, where they learned about the Sebastian Kneipp's hydrotherapy clinic in Munich and visited several other naturopathic clinics. His wife also had a correspondence with Dr. Bircher-Benner, a raw food advocate and founder of the Bircher Clinic in Zurich. Latto and his wife were both vegetarians. Latto had several well-known patients, including Sir Francis Chichester, who sailed round the world.

In 1960, Latto succeeded W. A. Sibly as President of the Manchester Vegetarian Society. He remained as president until 1987, overseeing the merger of the Manchester and London Vegetarian Societies into the Vegetarian Society of the United Kingdom. He also served as president of the International Vegetarian Union (IVU) from 1971 to 1990. In addition, he was vice-president of the Anti-Vivisection Society.

Latto retired from practising medicine in 1995. He died on 2 September 1998, in Reading, England.

== Personal life ==
Latto and his wife had five children. His daughter qualified as an osteopath, and three of their four sons also qualified in Medicine.
