= Henri Huchard =

French neurologist and cardiologist (1844–1910)

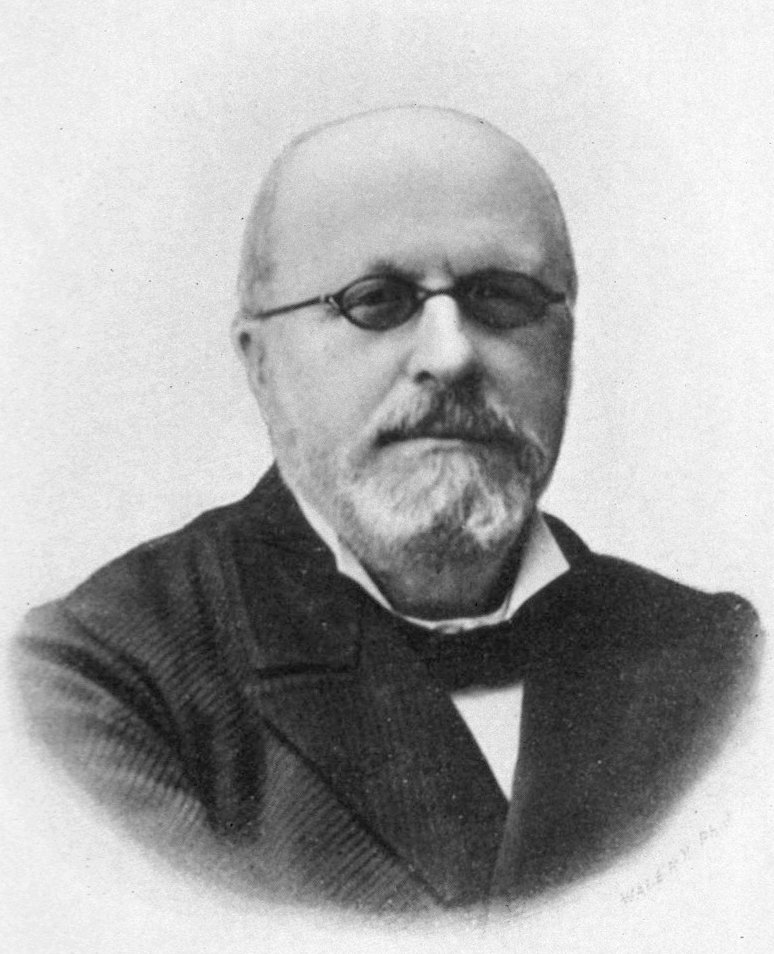
Henri Huchard, unknown date

Henri Huchard (4 April 1844 – 1 December 1910) was a French neurologist and cardiologist.

== Career ==
Huchard was born in Auxon, Aube. He studied medicine at the University of Paris, later being appointed médecin des hôpitaux. During his career he was associated with the Bichat and Necker hospitals in Paris. Huchard was a member of the Académie de Médecine.

Huchard specialized in the study of cardiovascular disease, and is remembered for his research of arteriosclerosis. His name is lent to "Huchard's disease" (continued arterial hypertension), and to "Huchard's sign", which is an indication of hypertension, and defined as a pulse rate that does not decrease when changing from a standing to a supine position.

Huchard married Berthe Gilbert with whom he had two sons.

== Vegetarianism ==
Huchard was not a vegetarian in his personal life but advocated its use as a therapeutic measure for certain conditions. He was the congress president of the International Vegetarian Union in 1910. In June 1910, he was a speaker at the 3rd World Vegetarian Congress in Brussels. Huchard was a member of the French Vegetarian Society.

== Selected publications ==
- La myocardite varioleuse (1870–71), with Louis Desnos
- Traité des névroses (1883) second edition, with Alexandre Axenfeld (1825–1876)
- Traité des maladies du coeur et des vaisscaux (1889)
- Consultations médicales (1901)
- Les maladies du coeur et leur traitement (1908)
