= J. Stenson Hooker =

English physician, naturopath, activist, and writer (1853–1946)

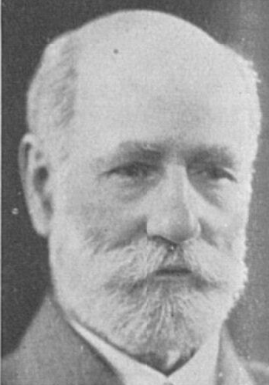
- Hooker, c. 1925
- Born: Joseph Stenson Hooker; 1853; Luton, England
- Died: 1946 (aged 93); Uxbridge, England
- Education: Durham University (MD)
- Occupations: Physician; naturopath; activist; writer

Joseph Stenson Hooker (1853–1946) was an English physician, naturopath, vegetarianism activist, and writer.

== Biography ==
Hooker was born in Luton in 1853. He obtained his MD from Durham University in 1899. Hooker practised in West London and contributed papers to The Lancet journal. He was firmly established within the medical profession but later came out against it. After Thomas Allinson died, he took over his address at Spanish Place, Manchester Square. Hooker criticized the use of drugs and advocated exercise, fresh air and a vegetarian diet. He also promoted naturopathic therapies such as bathing his patients in a coloured light bath, hypnotic suggestion, prayer and psychotherapeutics.

Hook was a Vice-President of the naturopathic Psycho-Therapeutic Society which was founded in 1901 for the "Study, Investigation, and Practice of Health Reform, Medical Hypnosis, Suggestive Therapeutics, Curative Human Radiations, and Drugless Healing, with due regard to Diet, Hygiene, and the observance of Natural Laws of Health". Hooker stated that mind over matter had a "tremendous power" and predicted that the work of the Psycho-Therapeutic Society "would undoubtedly develop in view of increase in nervous disease".

Hooker and his wife joined the British Nature Cure Association in 1907 and were on its executive committee. He was the only registered practitioner in the organization. He was medical secretary of the London Association for the Prevention of Premature Burial.

Because of his unorthodox naturopathic views about therapy, Hooker came into came into conflict with the medical establishment. In 1925, he was brought before the General Medical Council and was found "guilty of infamous conduct in a professional respect" for promoting an alleged "consumption cure" known as Newell treatment that was published in the John Bull magazine. The Newell treatment was proposed by Oliver Newell, a bacteriologist with no medical qualifications. Hooker did not disclose the formula to the remedy which was considered unprofessional. Hooker was also charged with sending letters supportive of the Newell treatment to patients not under his care but whom he had hoped to secure as his patients for his own professional advantage. The Council considered this an undoubted case of advertising and Hooker's name was erased from the Medical Register.

In the 1930s, Hooker took interest in herbalism. In 1942 aged 89, Hooker was re-instated on the Medical Register. He became a member of the British Medical Association.

Hooker was active until his sudden death in 1946, aged 93.

== Activism ==
=== Animal welfare ===
Hooker was an anti-vaccinationist and anti-vivisectionist. He attended the London Anti-Vivisection Society's annual meeting in 1905. He was vice-president of the British Union for the Abolition of Vivisection and president of their Edgeware branch. His pamphlet Why I am an Anti-Vivisection Doctor was published by the Animal Defence and Anti-Vivisection Society in 1927.

He was a supporter of the National Canine Defence League.

=== Vegetarianism ===
Hooker was a vegetarian in his personal life and recommended a vegetarian diet to his patients. Hooker was an advocate of fasting. In 1910, he fasted for two weeks and is alleged to have walked for miles. He preferred two meals a day throughout his later life. Hooker was a speaker at the Vegetarian Society's Diamond Jubilee anniversary in 1907. In 1907, thirteen medical men including Hooker signed a manifesto stating that vegetarianism is "scientifically a sound and satisfactory system of dietetics" and superior to health than meat eating.

== N-rays ==
Hooker developed Prosper-René Blondlot's N-ray theory. He held the view that all organisms emit N-rays and they are coloured differently depending on mental and physical factors of the individual.

== Selected publications ==
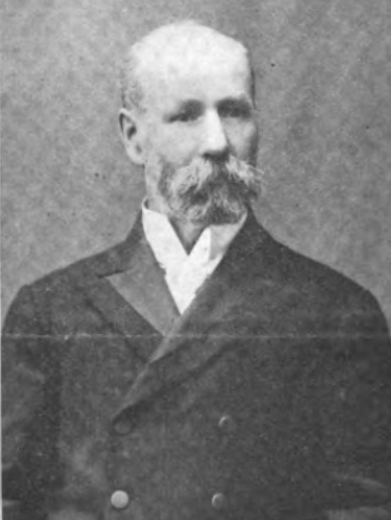
Hooker in 1913

- An Unusually Severe Case of Syphilis Acquired Without any Primary Sore (The Lancet, 1884)
- A New Light and Colour Bath (The Lancet, 1903)
- Electric-Light Baths for Hospitals (The Lancet, 1904)
- Human and Plant Rays (The Lancet, 1904)
- Human Rays and Their Spectra (The Lancet, 1904)
- The Trend of Modern Medicine (1905)
- The Letters of Little Mary (1905)
- The Higher Medicine (1907)
- How Not to Grow Old (1913)
- On Learning to Breathe (1913)
- A New Suggestion Treatment: Without Hypnotism (1914)
- A Spiritual Basis of Health (1921)
- The Newer Practice of Medicine (1932)
- The Humane Family Doctor (1937)
