= Maxwell G. Lee =

English educator and activist (1931–2005)

- Born: Maxwell George Lee Lipovitch; 5 December 1931; Woolwich, London, England
- Died: 3 March 2005 (aged 73); Stockport, England
- Education: University of London (B.A., Geography; Teacher's Certificate); University of Salford (M.Sc., Urban Studies)
- Occupations: Educator; geographer; activist
- Years active: 1950s–2005
- Organizations: International Vegetarian Union; Vegetarian Society; The Vegetarian Charity
- Known for: Veganism and vegetarianism activism
- Spouse: Sylvia M. Watts (m. 1959)
- Children: 3
- Awards: International Vegetarian of the Year Award (1995)

Maxwell George Lee Lipovitch (5 December 1931 – 3 March 2005) was an English educator, geographer, and vegan and vegetarian activist. He worked as a lecturer in urban geography and planning and was involved with school governance in the Manchester area. He held offices in several vegetarian organisations, including the International Vegetarian Union (IVU), where he was honorary general secretary from 1979 to 1996, deputy president from 1996 to 1999, and president in 1999. He was also chairman of the Vegetarian Society's council and later president of the society, and chaired The Vegetarian Charity from 1969 until his death.

== Biography ==
=== Early life and education ===
Lee was born Maxwell George Lee Lipovitch on 5 December 1931 in Woolwich, London. He grew up in London and studied at the University of London, where he earned a B.A. in geography and a teacher's certificate. He later earned an M.Sc. in urban studies from the University of Salford.

=== Career ===
==== Education ====
Lee worked as a lecturer in urban geography and planning, with interests in housing and urban issues. He taught at the Victoria University of Manchester, Manchester Metropolitan University, and the Open University. Before his academic career, he worked in teaching and teacher training.

He was also a governor of two comprehensive schools and served as chair of governors at one of them.

==== Vegetarianism and veganism ====
Lee became a vegetarian at the age of 12 for moral reasons and became vegan in 1985. He was involved with the Vegetarian Society from 1955 and served as chairman of the society's council for nearly 12 years. He was made a fellow of the society. At the time of his death, he was president of the society.

Lee chaired The Vegetarian Charity from 1969 until his death. The charity supported young vegetarians in need and promoted vegetarianism among young people. He served in the International Vegetarian Union as honorary general secretary from 1979 to 1996, and later as deputy president and president. He was a former president of the European Vegetarian Union and was appointed honorary fellow of the IVU for his services to international vegetarianism. He was also a trustee of a charity that provided a vegetarian home for street children in India and was associated with the Liverpool Vegetarian Home for Children and the Vegetarian Home for Children in Jersey.

Lee lectured on vegetarianism in Europe, the United States, Canada, Mexico, Israel, India, Thailand, Singapore, Hong Kong, Australia, and New Zealand, and appeared in television and radio broadcasts. In 1995, he received the International Vegetarian of the Year Award from the Reverence for Life Society of Mumbai. He also wrote articles on vegetarianism and produced and edited a newsletter on the subject.

==== Other organisations ====
Lee was active in geographical societies. He served as chairman of the Manchester Geographical Society and vice president of the Geographical Association's Manchester branch.

He also served as honorary secretary of the Marple Liberal Democrats.

=== Personal life and death ===
Lee married Sylvia M. Watts in 1959. They had three vegetarian daughters and six grandchildren who were lifelong vegetarians.

Lee died on 3 March 2005 in Stockport. His funeral took place there and was attended by around a hundred people, including representatives of the Vegan Society and the European Vegetarian Union. A tree-planting ceremony was planned at the Vegetarian Society's headquarters, with his ashes to be scattered on 17 September.

The Vegetarian Charity later established the Maxwell Lee Memorial Workshop, titled "Vegan Venture", for young vegetarians and vegans aged 16–25. The course was funded by The Vegetarian Charity and taught vegan cookery.
