= Paul Sandlands =

English Barrister and Judge

Paul Sandlands OBE QC

Recorder of Birmingham
- In office 1944–1959

Recorder of Leicester
- In office 1932–1944

Recorder of Newark
- In office 1915–1932

Personal details
- Born: Paul Ernest Sandlands; 25 May 1878
- Died: 8 March 1962 (aged 83)
- Occupation: Barrister

Paul Ernest Sandlands OBE QC (25 May 1878 – 8 March 1962) was an English barrister and judge.

Sandlands was the son of J. P. Sandlands, the Vicar of Brigstock, Northamptonshire. He was educated privately and at Trinity College, Cambridge, where he read law. Immediately after graduation he joined the City Imperial Volunteers Mounted Infantry and served in the South African War. In 1900 he was called to the Bar by the Inner Temple and joined the Midland Circuit, building up a successful practice. He held the rank of commander in the Birmingham Special Constabulary during the First World War.

In 1915 he was appointed Recorder of Newark, one of the youngest recorders in the country. In 1928 he was made a Bencher, in 1932 became Recorder of Leicester, and in 1935 took silk. In 1944 he became Recorder of Birmingham and held the post until his retirement in 1959.

Sandlands was appointed Officer of the Order of the British Empire (OBE) in the 1920 civilian war honours for his police service.
