= W. A. Sibly =

English headmaster, activist, and writer (1882–1959)

W. A. Sibly JP
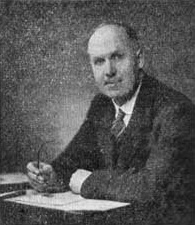
- Born: William Arthur Sibly; 14 May 1882; Wycliffe College, Gloucestershire, England
- Died: 20 September 1959 (aged 77); Pitchcombe, near Stroud, Gloucestershire, England
- Other name: W. A. S.
- Education: Wycliffe College; Lincoln College, Oxford (M.A.)
- Occupations: Headmaster; activist; writer
- Years active: 1906–1959
- Known for: Serving as headmaster of Wycliffe College; presidency of the Vegetarian Society and International Vegetarian Union

William Arthur Sibly JP (14 May 1882 – 20 September 1959), also known by his initials W. A. S., was an English headmaster, activist, and writer. He was born at Wycliffe College, Gloucestershire, and was educated there and at Lincoln College, Oxford. He was headmaster of Wycliffe from 1912 to 1947. A lifelong vegetarian, he conducted dietary experiments at the school and held posts in vegetarian organisations, including president of the Vegetarian Society from 1938 and president of the International Vegetarian Union from 1947 to 1953. He was also a magistrate and justice of the peace, a council member of the RSPCA, an office-holder in anti-vivisection and anti-vaccination groups, a local Methodist preacher, and the founding president of a cycling club.

== Biography ==
=== Early life and education ===
William Arthur Sibly was born on 14 May 1882 at Wycliffe College, Gloucestershire, less than a year after its foundation by his father, G. W. Sibly, who was its first headmaster. He spent his childhood within the school grounds and later became its senior boy. According to a memoir in The Star, Sibly was academically and athletically successful at the school. He followed his father to Lincoln College, Oxford, which were his only years away from Wycliffe before his retirement. He graduated with an M.A..

=== Career at Wycliffe College ===
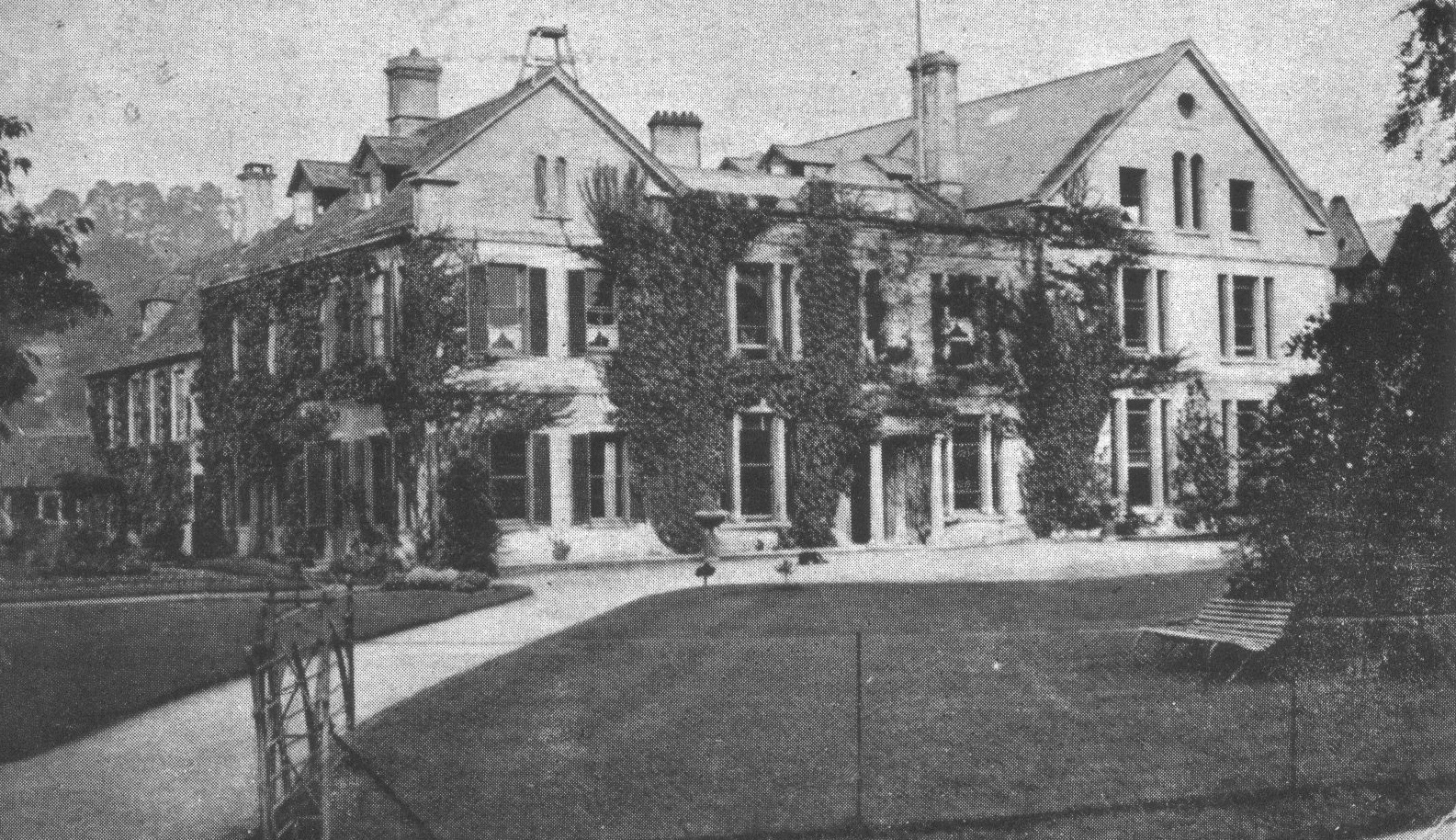
Wycliffe College in 1900

Sibly began teaching as an assistant master at Wycliffe in 1906. In 1910, he became housemaster of Springfield, one of the school's boarding houses. In 1912, after his father had an accident, he succeeded him as headmaster at the age of 30. He remained in office during World War I, when the school faced difficulties in staffing and operation.

During Sibly's time as headmaster, Wycliffe added new buildings, including Berryfield, the Library, the Assembly Hall, and the Memorial Chapel Tower and Spire. In 1931, he transferred the school to its first Council of Governors, a change he had initiated, and continued to work with the council.

=== Vegetarianism ===
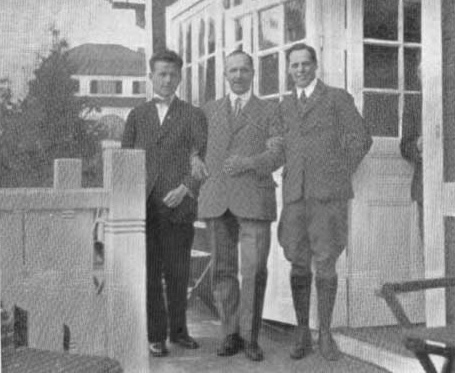
Sibly (centre) at the 1923 IVU Congress in Sweden

Sibly was a lifelong vegetarian. His father founded Wycliffe in 1882 with a vegetarian ethos, and the school offered a ten percent discount on fees to vegetarian pupils. In 1910, under Sibly's direction, the boys at Springfield House were given a vegetarian diet as an experiment. Their physical growth and intellectual performance were monitored and compared with those of non-vegetarian boys. Springfield appears to have continued the practice until Sibly's death.

In 1923, Sibly attended the International Vegetarian Union (IVU) Congress in Sweden, where he presented a paper, "The Work Done at Wycliffe College", on the school's vegetarian practices. He continued to attend later IVU congresses.

In 1926, he presided over a session at the London Congress, where he discussed the vegetarian diet at Wycliffe and its approval by the New Health Society. He also wrote the pamphlet "Vegetarianism and the Growing Boy". According to The Vegan, the pamphlet stated that vegetarian pupils had maintained similar levels of achievement in scholarship and athletics to non-vegetarian pupils over 30 years.

Sibly became president of the Vegetarian Society in 1938. He held the office during the society's centenary in 1947. He was also a vice-president of the London Vegetarian Society.

By the 1947 IVU Congress, Sibly had become president of the IVU, a post he held until 1953. He helped restart the organisation after World War II. He hosted and largely organised the 11th World Vegetarian Congress at Wycliffe in 1947, where he was re-elected as president.

During his presidency, Sibly attended the 1950 Congress in the Netherlands, where he gave a lantern lecture titled "A Vegetarian Wanders Around the Commonwealth", on Australasia. At the Congress, he described vegetarianism as a hope for the future of humanity.

=== Later life ===
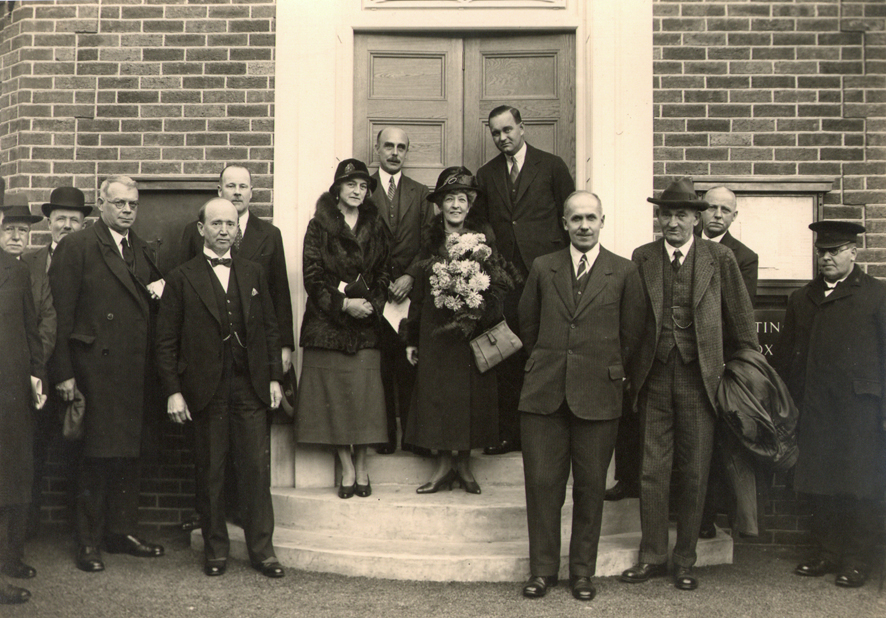
Sibly (fourth from the right) at the opening of Stonehouse Post Office in 1933

After retiring from Wycliffe in 1945, Sibly travelled to South Africa, India, Canada, New Zealand, Australia, Malaya, Kenya, the Middle East, West Africa, the United States, the West Indies, and South America. He remained in contact with vegetarian groups and former pupils.

After leaving the IVU presidency in 1953, Sibly served as past president and remained active in the organisation. He chaired meetings and attended congresses, including the 1955 Paris Congress and the 1957 Congress in India, where he spoke on vegetarianism, culture, and health.

Sibly also held public and voluntary roles. He was chairman of the Stonehouse magistrates and was a justice of the peace. He was a council member of the RSPCA and was involved with local and national organisations, including the executive councils of the National Society for the Abolition of Cruel Sports and the National Anti-Vaccination League. He was also a local Methodist preacher.

=== Personal life and death ===
Sibly was a non-smoker and teetotaller. He opposed vaccination and vivisection. A cyclist, he was the founding president of the Stonehouse Wheelers' Club.

Sibly never married. An obituary in the Lincoln College Record described him as somewhat eccentric and stated that he had devoted his life to the school.

Sibly died at the Resthaven, Pitchcombe, after an operation, on 20 September 1959, aged 77. A memorial service was held in Wycliffe College Chapel, conducted by the chaplain, Rev. F. D. Morley. Rev. F. F. Clutterbuck gave readings and Rev. T. S. Dixon gave an address. The Wycliffe Choir led the singing. Headmaster S. G. H. Loosley, staff, relatives, and a large congregation attended, including representatives from the Gloucestershire Education Committee, Vegetarian Society, Boy Scouts Association, and other organisations associated with Sibly.

== Legacy ==
According to the IVU, Sibly's death marked the end of an era for the organisation.

Sibly Hall at Wycliffe, commemorating Sibly and his father, opened in 1964. S. G. H. Loosley's book, Wycliffe College: The First Hundred Years, 1882–1982, was dedicated to Sibly.

== Selected publications ==
- Register of Old Wycliffians (1907, 1913, 1926, 1958)
- "Vegetarianism and the Growing Boy" (1914, 1942)
- "Health for Our Boys and Girls" (c. 1920–1929)
- Wycliffe and the War (joint editor, 1923)
- A Memoir of George William Sibly (1930)
- "An Experiment in Vegetarian Diet". The Vegetarian: 36–38. Spring 1947.
