= Fougax-et-Barrineuf =

Commune in Occitanie, France

- Commune
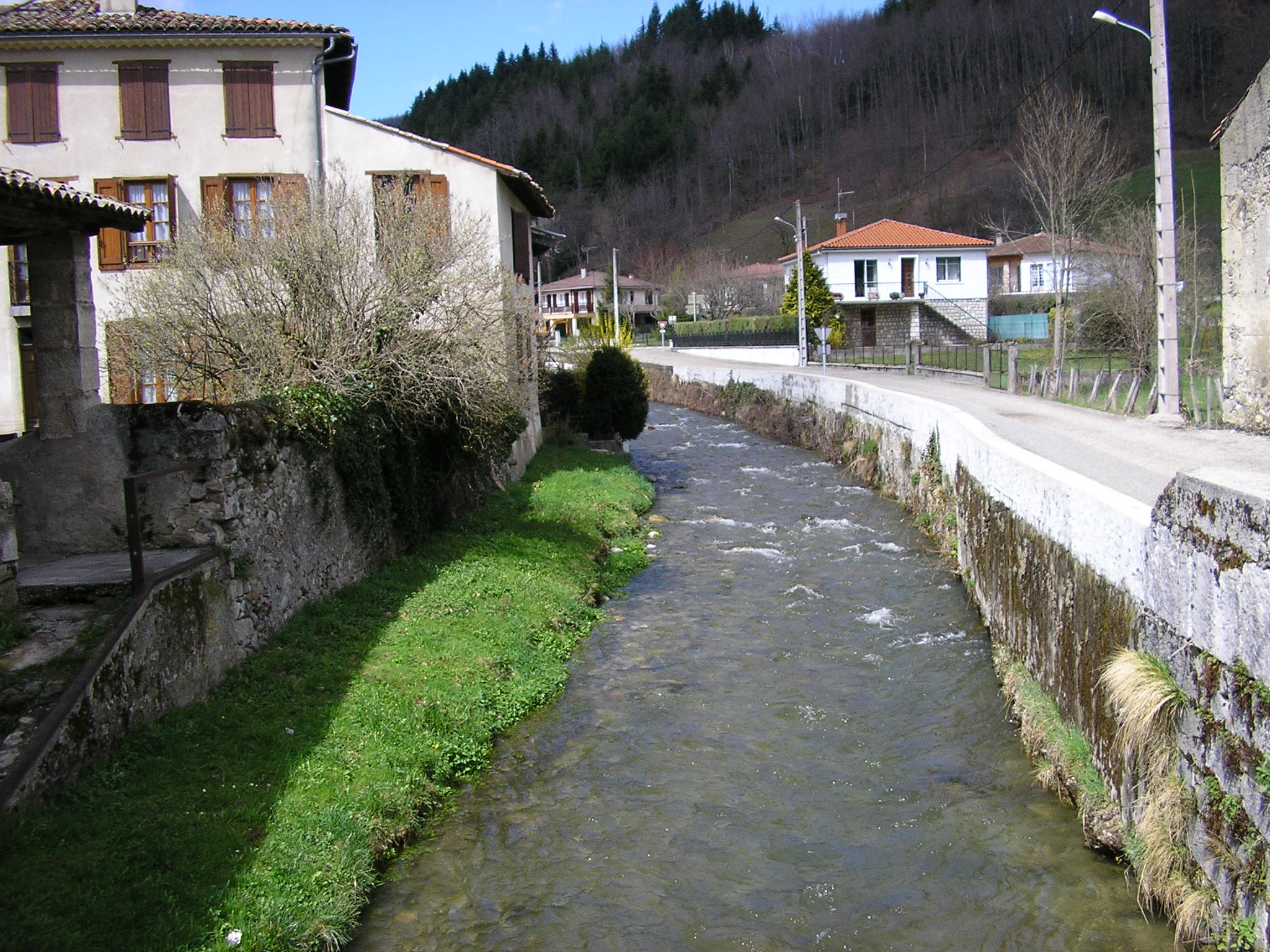
- The Lasset in Fougax
- Location of Fougax-et-Barrineuf
- Location within France Location within Occitanie
- Coordinates: 42°52′51″N 1°53′36″E
- Country: France
- Region: Occitania
- Department: Ariège
- Arrondissement: Pamiers
- Canton: Pays d'Olmes
- Intercommunality: Pays d'Olmes

Government
  - Mayor (2020–2026): Hervé Antoine Laffont
- Area^{1}: 31.48 km^{2} (12.15 sq mi)
- Elevation: 549 m (1,801 ft)
- Highest elevation: 1,120 m (3,670 ft)
- Lowest elevation: 511 m (1,677 ft)
- Population (2023): 428
  - Density: 13.6/km^{2} (35.2/sq mi)
- Time zone: UTC+01:00 (CET)
  - Summer (DST): UTC+02:00 (CEST)
- INSEE/Postal code: 09125 /09300
- ^{1} French Land Register data, which excludes lakes, ponds, glaciers > 1 km^{2} (0.386 sq mi or 247 acres) and river estuaries.

Fougax-et-Barrineuf (French pronunciation: [fuɡa e baʁinœ]; Occitan: Fogats e Barrinòu) is a commune in the Ariège department in southwestern France.

== Population ==
Historical population
Year	Pop.	±% p.a.
1968	542	—
1975	508	−0.92%
1982	492	−0.46%
1990	506	+0.35%
1999	448	−1.34%
2007	506	+1.53%
2012	476	−1.21%
2017	436	−1.74%
2023	428	−0.31%
Source: INSEE

== See also ==
- Communes of the Ariège department
