= Albert Broadbent (vegetarian) =

English activist and writer (1867–1912)

The Reverend Albert Broadbent FSS FRHS
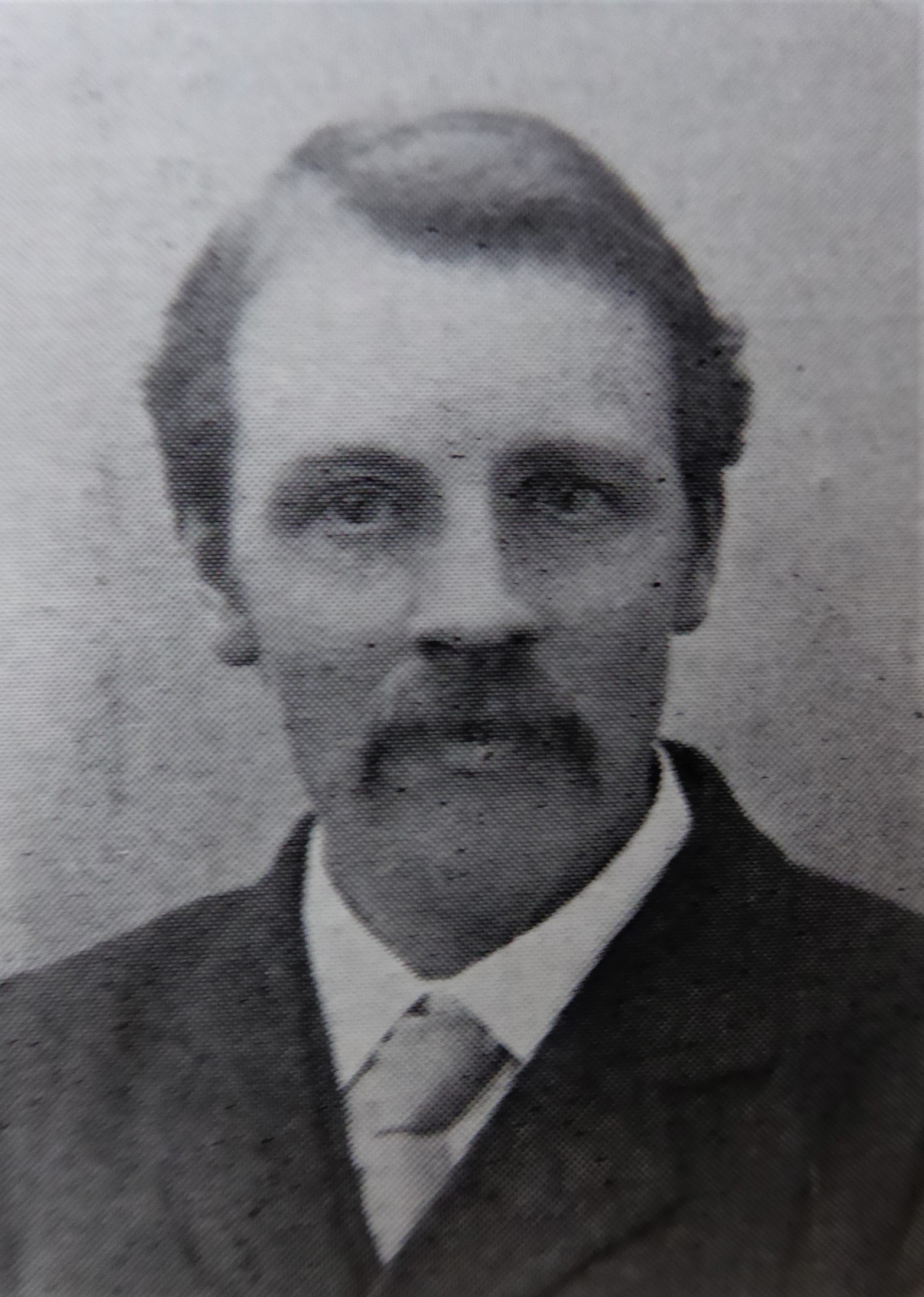
- Broadbent, c. 1902
- Born: 17 February 1867; Hollingworth, England
- Died: 21 January 1912 (aged 44); Longsight, Manchester, England
- Resting place: Southern Cemetery, Manchester
- Occupations: Activist; writer; editor; publisher; lecturer; restaurateur
- Years active: 1895–1912
- Spouse: Christina Harrison (m. 1892)
- Children: 1
- Relatives: William Harrison (father-in-law); Hannah Harrison (mother-in-law)

Albert Broadbent FSS FRHS (17 February 1867 – 21 January 1912) was an English activist, writer, editor, publisher, lecturer, and restaurateur. He was secretary of the Vegetarian Society and edited The Vegetarian Messenger and Health Review. He lectured on vegetarianism and dietetics, revised vegetarian literature, and represented the society at international congresses. He also founded vegetarian restaurants in Edinburgh, Aberdeen, and Leicester, which were intended to provide employment for women and low-cost vegetarian meals.

Broadbent later became a Bible Christian deacon and lay preacher. He was also a Fellow of the Statistical Society and a Fellow of the Royal Horticultural Society. He died in 1912 after a nervous breakdown, following financial losses connected with his restaurant ventures.

== Biography ==
=== Early life ===
Albert Broadbent was born in Hollingworth on 17 February 1867 to Joseph Broadbent and Mary Ann Broadbent. He was baptised in Tintwistle on 12 May 1867.

He became a vegetarian at the age of 26 after hearing a speech by Richard Coad.

=== Vegetarianism ===
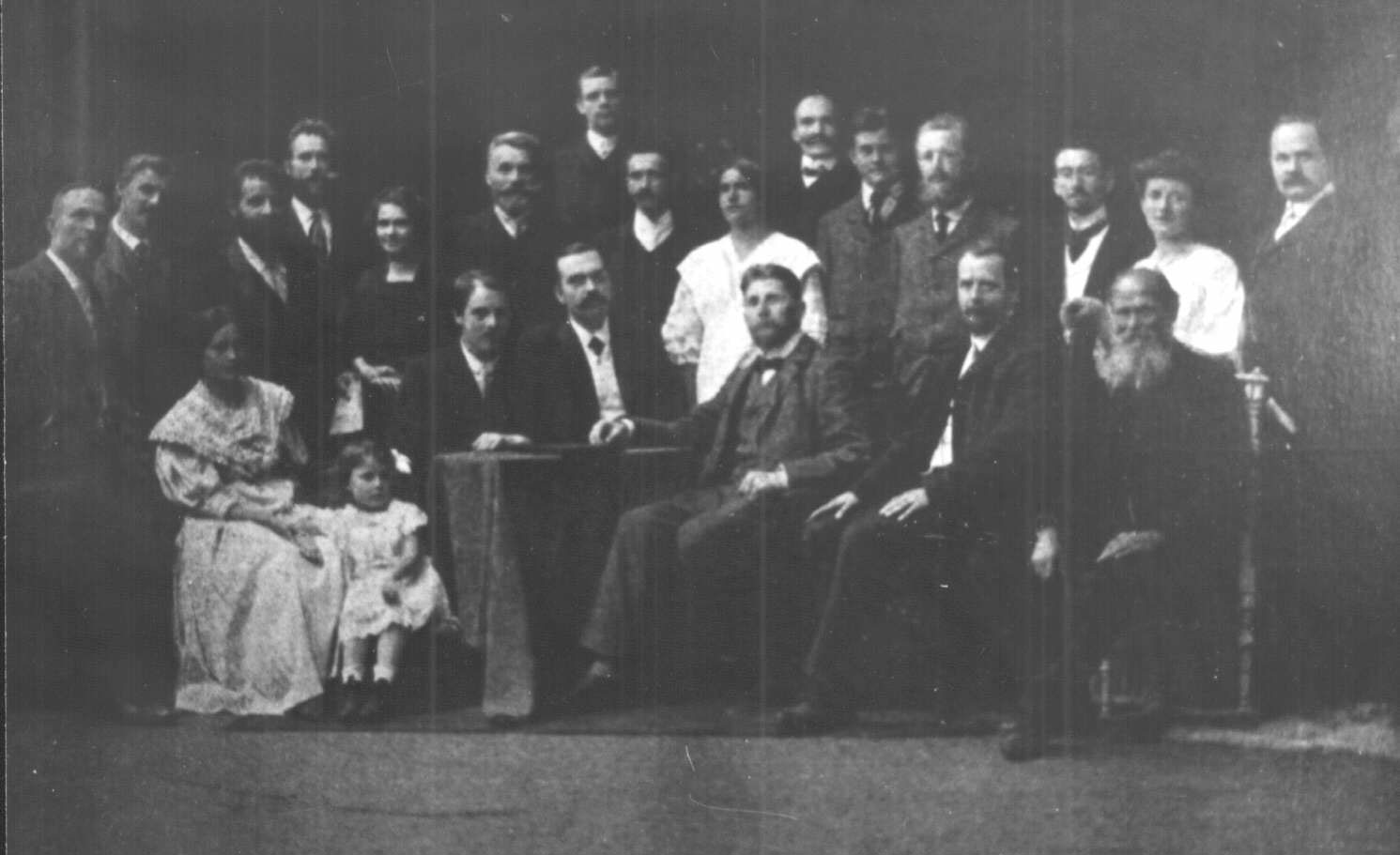
Broadbent (centre) at the 1st World Vegetarian Congress in 1908

Broadbent originally intended to pursue a commercial career, but joined the staff of the Vegetarian Society in 1894 and became its secretary in 1895. He was also editor of the society's journal, The Vegetarian Messenger and Health Review.

Broadbent represented the society at international congresses in Paris, Dresden, St. Louis, and London. He was active in the Vegetarian Federal Union and attended its meetings from 1893.

Broadbent lectured on vegetarianism and dietetics. He also revised vegetarian literature. In 1907, he published an abridged edition of Howard Williams' The Ethics of Diet.

Broadbent's 1902 book Science in the Daily Meal argued that a vegetarian diet could support physical development and included 100 recipes free of uric acid. The book promoted the use of plasmon, which was disputed among some vegetarians. In 1903, J. P. Sandlands replied to Broadbent's book with Science in the Daily Meal Criticised, or Plasmon Confounded.

Broadbent founded vegetarian restaurants in Edinburgh, Aberdeen, and Leicester. According to Wm. M. Scott, the restaurants were intended to improve women's employment prospects by providing work at a living wage, and to make low-cost vegetarian meals available to poorer customers. The venture failed and caused Broadbent financial loss.

=== Other activities ===
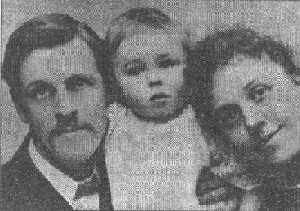
Broadbent with his family

Broadbent later became a Bible Christian deacon and lay preacher. He served in Congregational, Unitarian, and Labour Churches.

Broadbent was a Fellow of the Statistical Society and a Fellow of the Royal Horticultural Society.

Broadbent edited and published the Broadbent Treasuries of Poets, a series of 14 books. He also edited and published six literary miniatures.

=== Personal life and death ===
Broadbent married Christina, daughter of William Harrison of Manchester, in 1892. They had one daughter.

After what Scott described as a complete nervous breakdown, Broadbent died on 21 January 1912 at his home in Longsight, Manchester. He was buried in Southern Cemetery on 25 January.

== Publications ==
=== As author or editor ===
- Forty Vegetarian Dinners (1900)
- Andrew Glendinning's Apple Tree Cookery Book and Guide to Rational Diet (edited by Albert Broadbent, 1902)
- "Diet in Relation To the Problem of Poverty" (Journal of the Sanitary Institute, 1902)
- "Shall We Slay to Eat?" (Good Health, November 1902), pp. 537–538
- Science in the Daily Meal (1902)
- The Vegetarian Textbook (edited by Albert Broadbent, 1903)
- The Building of the Body (1903)
- How to Keep Warm (1904)
- Fruits, Nuts and Vegetables: Their Use as Food and Medicine (1908)
- Salads: Their Uses as Food & Medicine (1909)
- Food, Its Influence on Character (c. 1910)
- "Fifty Valuable Meatless Recipes" (Physical Culture, 1910)
- 160 Meatless Recipes (1925)

=== Broadbent Treasuries of Poets ===
- A Festus Treasury
- A Treasury of Consolation
- A Mackenzie Bell Treasury
- A Treasury of Translations
- An Emerson Treasury
- A Treasury of Devotional Poems
- A Brotherhood Treasury
- A Whittier Treasury
- A Treasury of Love
- A Russell Lowell Treasury
- A Norman Gale Treasury
- A Wordsworth Treasury
- A Longfellow Treasury
- A Nature Treasury

== See also ==
- Christian vegetarianism
- History of vegetarianism
- Vegetarianism in the Victorian era
- Vegetarianism in the United Kingdom
- Temperance movement in the United Kingdom
