= Alfred B. Olsen =

American physician and writer (1869–1960)

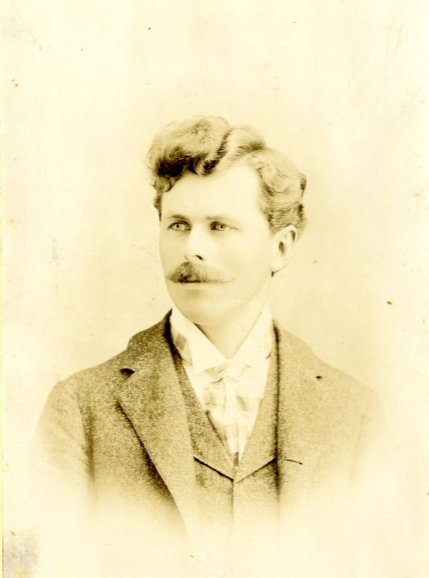
- Born: June 26, 1869; Fort Atkinson, Wisconsin
- Died: August 8, 1960 (aged 91); Loma Linda, California
- Education: University of Michigan
- Occupations: Physician, writer

Alfred Berthier Olsen (June 26, 1869 – August 8, 1960) was an American physician, Seventh-day Adventist and vegetarian.

== Biography ==
Olsen was born at Fort Atkinson, Wisconsin. His father was Seventh-day Adventist minister Ole Andres Olsen.

Olsen obtained his M.D. from University of Michigan in 1894 and his M.S. in 1896. He obtained his D.P.H. from University of Cambridge in 1910. He qualified F.A.C.P., F.R.S.M., L.R.C.P. and M.R.C.S. in London. From 1924, Olsen was Professor of Physiology at Battle Creek College for many years. He was Professor of Physiology and Pathology at the American Medical Missionary College.

Olsen was active in the early development of Seventh-day Adventist medical work and conducted lecture tours in Scotland and Wales. He founded the Good Health journal and was its editor during 1901–1919. His brother was Mahlon Ellsworth Olsen. Olsen's book School of Health (1906) promoted exercise, hygienic practices and a vegetarian diet. He opposed the consumption of dairy products, alcohol, coffee and tea.

Olsen was a Fellow of the American College of Physicians and the Royal Society of Medicine. He died at Loma Linda, California on August 8, 1960.

== Selected publications ==
- School of Health: A Guide to Health in the Home (with M. Ellsworth Olsen, 1906)
- Health for the Million: A Book of Practical Health Culture (with M. Ellsworth Olsen, 1908)
- How to Preserve the Teeth (Good Health, 1912)
