= International Vegetarian Union =

International non-profit organisation

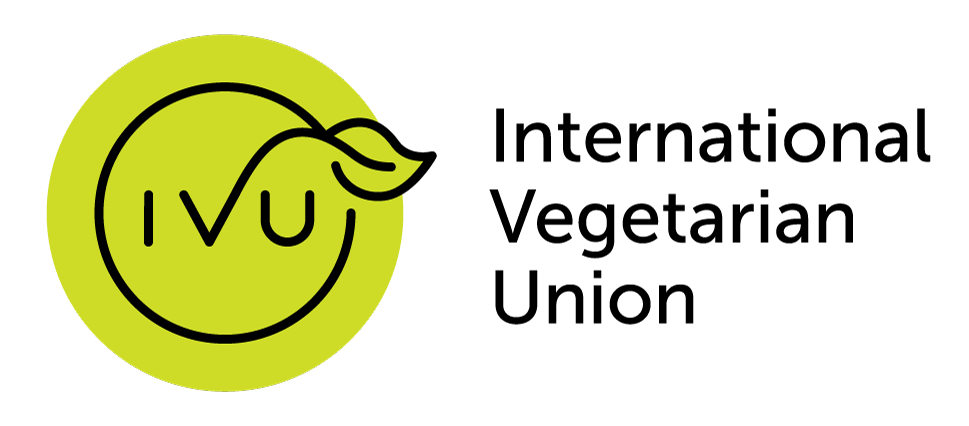
- Abbreviation: IVU
- Predecessor: Vegetarian Federal Union
- Formation: 1908; 118 years ago
- Founder: Georges Danjou
- Founded at: Dresden, Germany
- Type: Nonprofit
- Region served: Worldwide
- Chairman of the International Council: Marly Winckler
- Website: ivu.org

The International Vegetarian Union (IVU) is an international non-profit organization whose purpose is to promote vegetarianism. The IVU was founded in 1908 in Dresden, Germany.

It is an umbrella organisation, which includes organisations from many countries and often organises World and Regional Vegetarian Congresses. These alternate in two-year cycles.

== Origin ==
In 1907, the British Vegetarian Society celebrated its diamond jubilee by inviting leaders from vegetarian societies to an international gathering. At the gathering Georges Danjou, vice-president of the French Vegetarian Society, proposed a new International Vegetarian Federation. Albert Broadbent, secretary of the Vegetarian Society, wrote to vegetarian societies around the world inviting them to meet in Dresden on 18 August 1908.

The International Vegetarian Union (IVU) was founded in 1908 at the first World Vegetarian Congress in Dresden. German, British and Dutch Societies attended with support from 14 other countries. Broadbent, Dr. Meyroos secretary of the Netherlands Vegetarian Society and Gustav A. Selss, president of the German Vegetarian Association were elected members of the IVU provisional Committee.

== History ==
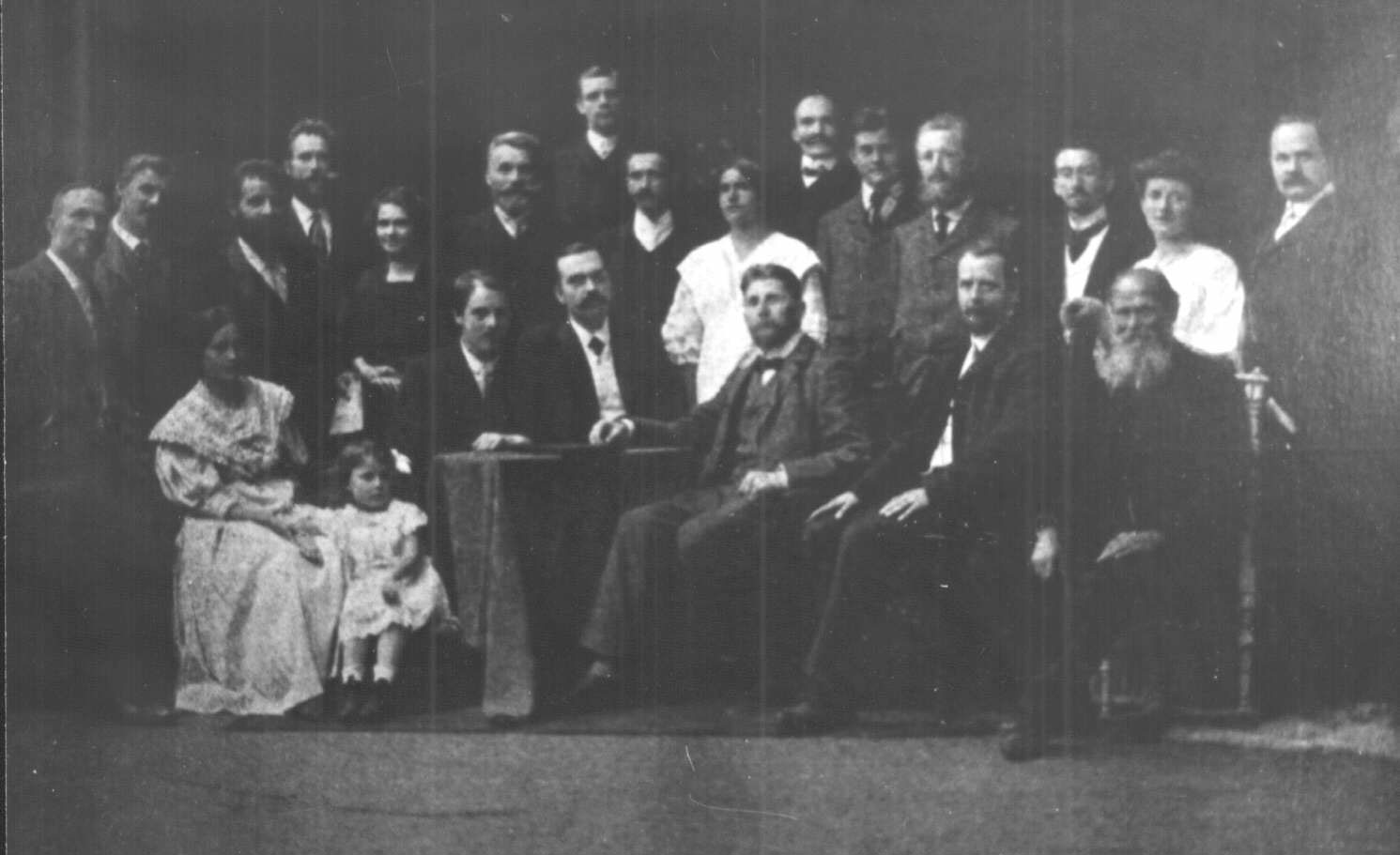
Participants in the first World Vegetarian Congress in 1908

The ruling body from IVU is the International Council and the eight elected members who form it serve four year terms. Each council member must be vegetarian and hold a current position within a member organization.

Member organizations may be continental groups (EVU, VUNA, NAVS, etc.), local or other regional vegetarian organizations whose primary purpose is the promotion of vegetarianism and the support of vegetarian living (e.g. EarthSave).

The IVU Congress president from 1923 to 1926 was Ernest Bell. The 6th World Vegetarian Congress held in London in 1926 featured displays of vegetarian boots as well as furs, gloves, tennis rackets and violin strings all made without any animal substances. There was a unanimous decision to exclude membership from any society that allowed fish consumption.

The 15th World Vegetarian Congress was held in India, in 1957. It has been described by historians as bringing together Hindu nationalism and internationalism.

The IVU also encourages regional and national organizations to run vegetarian festivals, such as the 43rd World VegFest in Sydney and Melbourne, Australia, on 25 October 2015 and the hundreds of currently organized vegetarian festivals on many continents.

The organization's 1975 World Vegetarian Congress in Orono, Maine, has been called the most significant event of the vegetarian movement in the United States in the 20th century and led to the 1974 founding of the North American Vegetarian Society.

In November 1999, the IVU role of president was abolished and was replaced by Chairman of the International Council. Marly Winckler is the current Chair of IVU.

== People ==
=== Presidents ===
Congress Presidents
1909	William E. A. Axon
1910	Henri Huchard
1910–1913	Hugo Nolthenius
1920–1923	Johan Lindstrom-Saxon
1923–1926	Ernest Bell
1926–1929	Herr B. O. Dürr
1929–1932	Herr Carl Gumprecht
2004	Marly Winckler

IVU Presidents
1932–	C. J. van Borrendam
1947–1953	W. A. Sibly
1953–1959	Gloria Maude Gasque
1960–1971	Woodland Kahler
1971–1990	Gordon Latto
1996–1999	Howard Lyman
1999	Maxwell Lee
2000–2002	Kevin Pickard
2002–2008	Tina Fox
2008–2011	George Jacobs
2018–Present	Marly Winckler

IVU Representatives
2019–	Rune-Christoffer Dragsdahl - Europe
2022–	Rubem da Costa Gomes - Africa
2024–	Thao Le - Asia
2024–	Shara NG - China

Honorary General Secretaries
1979–1996	Maxwell Lee
1996–1999	Francisco Martín

=== Notable members ===
- Rukmini Devi Arundale
- Bertrand P. Allinson
- Richard St. Barbe Baker
- Maurice Beddow Bayly
- James Clark
- Jacques de Marquette
- H. Jay Dinshah
- Jesse Mercer Gehman
- Jules Grand
- Alex Hershaft
- Geoffrey Hodson
- Roberta Kalechofsky
- Ernest Nyssens
- Dugald Semple
- Henry Bailey Stevens
- Scott Nearing
- Alan Stoddard
- Frank Wokes

== Regional groups ==
- Asian Pacific Vegan Union (APVU) (formerly known as Asia Pacific Vegetarian Union)
- European Vegetarian Union (founded in 1988)
- Vegetarian Union of North America (preceded by the American Vegetarian Union 1949–1980s and the North American Vegetarian Society 1974–1987)
- South American Vegetarian Union
- Southeast Asian Vegetarian Union

== See also ==
- List of vegetarian festivals
- List of vegetarian and vegan organizations
- Vegetarianism by country
- People for the Ethical Treatment of Animals
