= Vegetarian Society =

British vegetarianism charity

- Vegetarian Society of the United Kingdom

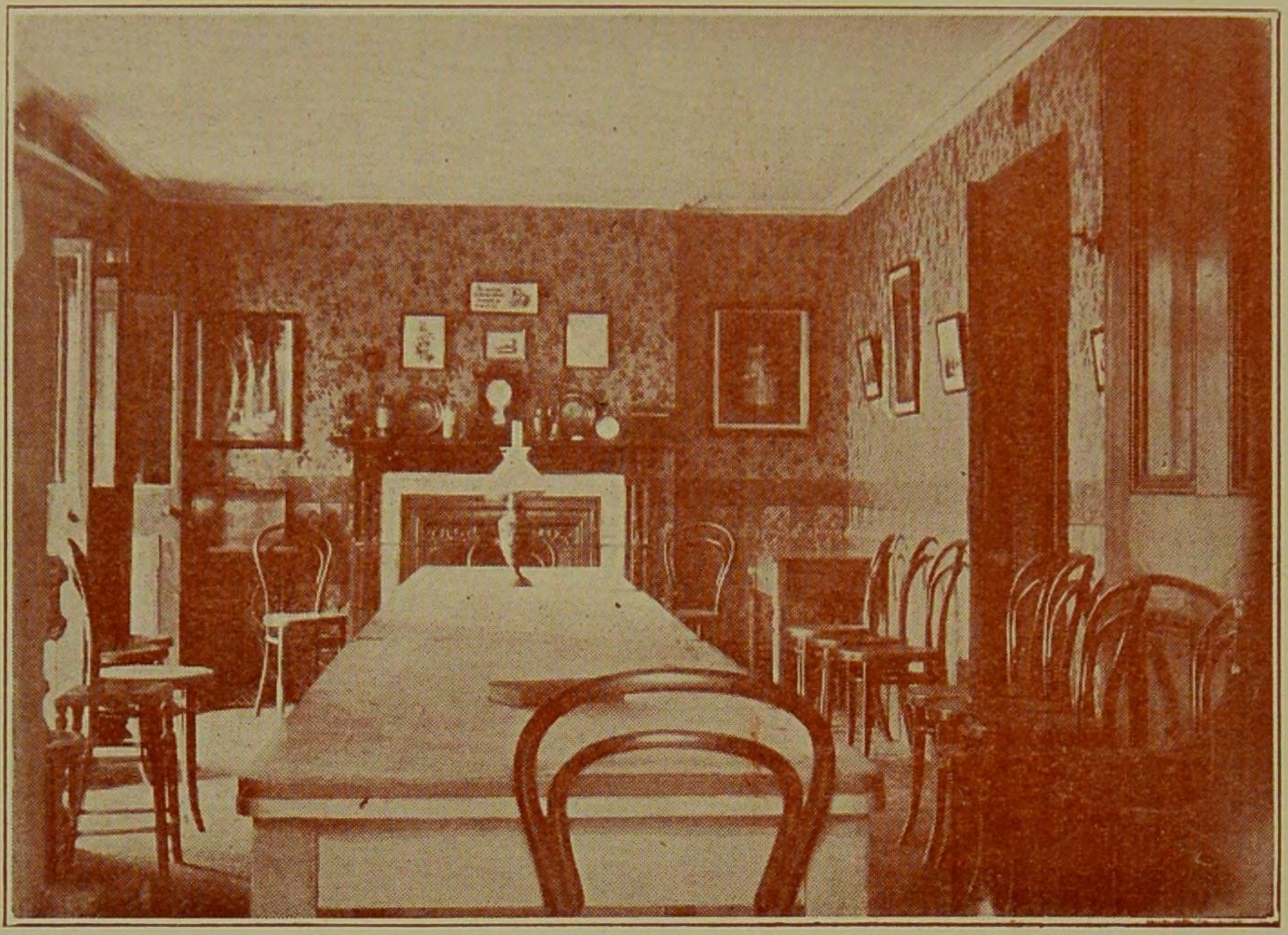
- Interior of Northwood Villa, where the Society was founded in 1847
- Abbreviation: VSUK
- Formation: 30 September 1847; 179 years ago
- Founded at: Ramsgate, Kent, England
- Merger of: Manchester Vegetarian Society; London Vegetarian Society
- Type: Charity
- Registration no.: 259358
- Legal status: Charity
- Purpose: Promoting vegetarianism
- Headquarters: Manchester, England
- Region served: United Kingdom
- Members: 6,500 (2023)
- CEO: Richard McIlwain
- Main organ: The Pod
- Revenue: £1,081,545 (2023)
- Expenses: £1,426,451 (2023)
- Staff: 18 (2023)
- Website: vegsoc.org

The Vegetarian Society of the United Kingdom (VSUK) is a British registered charity that promotes vegetarian diets. It licenses Vegetarian Society Approved trademarks for vegetarian and vegan products, runs a cookery school and lottery, and organises National Vegetarian Week in the United Kingdom.

The Society was founded in 1847 at Ramsgate, Kent, after earlier activity by British groups that promoted meat-free diets. It later split into the Manchester and London Vegetarian Societies in 1888, before the two organisations reunited in 1969 as the Vegetarian Society of the United Kingdom.

== Focus areas and activities ==
Vegetarian Society Approved
- Effective since: 1969; 57 years ago (vegetarian) 2017; 9 years ago (vegan)

The Vegetarian Society campaigns to encourage dietary changes, reduce meat consumption, and assist policymakers in developing a more compassionate food system.

In 1969, the Society introduced the Vegetarian Society Approved trademark. It launched a Vegetarian Society Approved vegan trademark in 2017. The trademarks are licensed to companies for products that contain only vegetarian or vegan ingredients, and for which no non-vegetarian or non-vegan substances were used during production. They are used on products sold in shops and supermarkets, and on restaurant dishes. In 2022, McDonald's launched the McPlant burger across the United Kingdom, accredited with the Vegetarian Society Approved vegan trademark.

National Vegetarian Week is the charity's main annual event. It started in 1992 as a single day and was later expanded into a full week.

The Vegetarian Society Cookery School runs leisure classes in vegetarian and vegan cooking. It works with charities and community groups to provide cookery courses, and offers training for professional chefs and people seeking work in the food sector through its Professional Chef's Diploma programme.

== History ==
=== 19th century ===
In the 19th century, several groups in Britain promoted and followed meat-free diets. Groups involved in the formation of the Vegetarian Society included members of the Bible Christian Church, supporters of the Concordium, and readers of the Truth-Tester journal.

==== Bible Christian Church ====
The Bible Christian Church was founded in 1809 in Salford by Reverend William Cowherd after a split from the Swedenborgians. One feature of the Bible Christians was a belief in a meat-free diet, or ovo-lacto vegetarianism, as a form of temperance.

==== Concordium (Alcott House) ====
The Concordium was a boarding school near London on Ham Common, Richmond, Surrey, which opened in 1838. Pupils at the school followed a diet without animal products, now described as a vegan diet. The Concordium was also called Alcott House, after the American education and food reform advocate Amos Bronson Alcott. In 1843, members of Alcott House created the British and Foreign Society for the Promotion of Humanity and Abstinence from Animal Food, led by Sophia Chichester, a benefactor of Alcott House.

==== Truth-Tester and Physiological Conference, 1847 ====
The Truth-Tester was a journal that published material supporting the temperance movement. In 1846, the editorship was taken over by William Horsell, operator of the Northwood Villa Hydropathic Institute in Ramsgate. Horsell gradually moved the Truth-Tester towards promotion of a "Vegetable Diet". In early 1847, a letter to the Truth-Tester proposed the formation of a Vegetarian Society. In response, William Oldham held what he called a "physiological conference" in July 1847 at the Concordium. Up to 130 people attended, including the Bible Christian James Simpson, who presented a speech. The conference passed several resolutions, including one to reconvene at the end of September.

==== Ramsgate Conference, 1847 ====
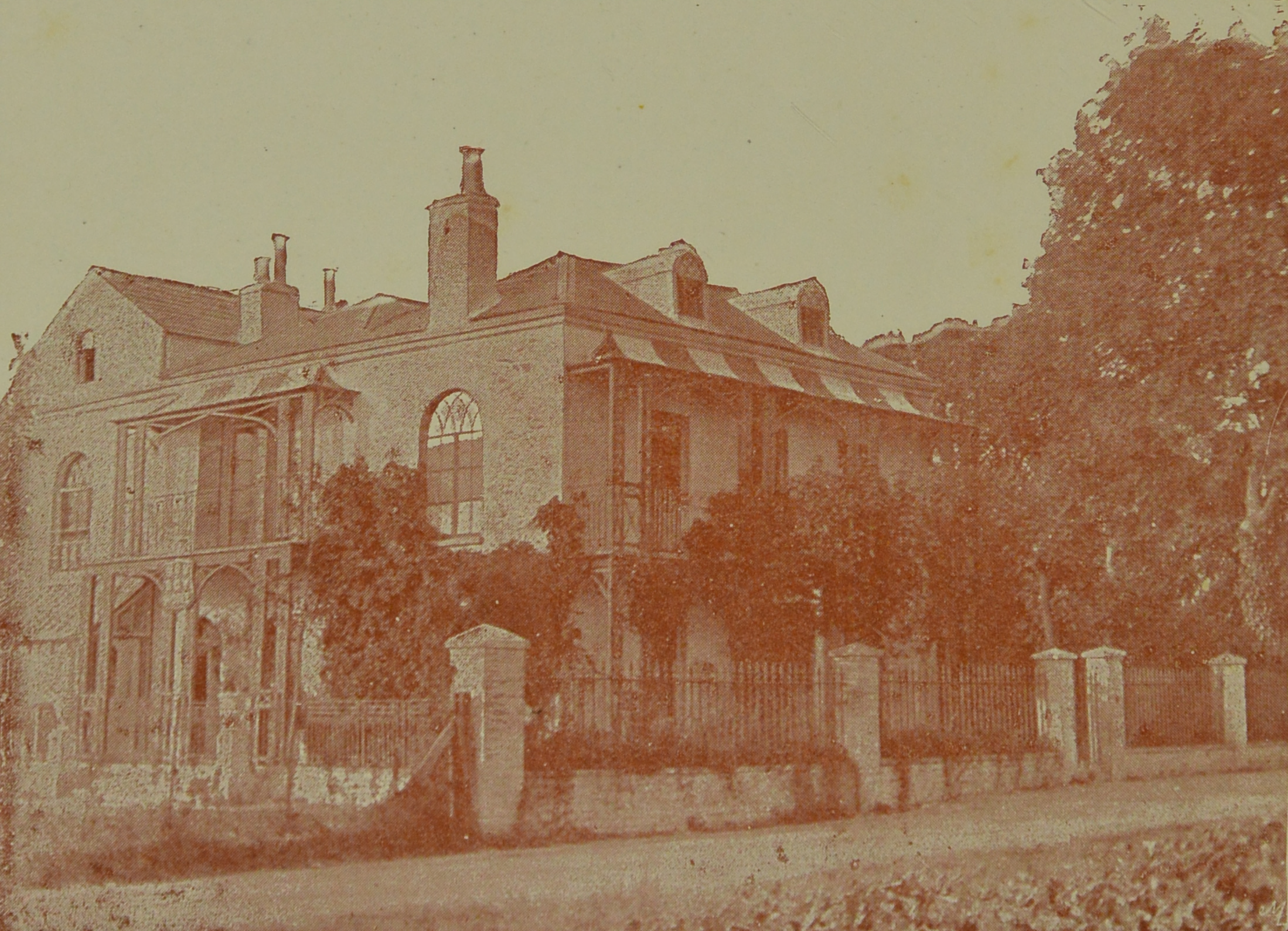
Northwood Villa, the site of the 1847 Ramsgate conference

On 30 September 1847, the meeting planned at the Physiological Conference took place at Northwood Villa Hydropathic Institute in Ramsgate. Joseph Brotherton, MP for Salford, and a Bible Christian, chaired. James Simpson was elected president of the society, the Concordist William Oldham was elected treasurer, and Truth-Tester editor William Horsell was elected secretary. The name "Vegetarian Society" was chosen for the new organisation by a unanimous vote.

==== After Ramsgate ====
The Vegetarian Society's first full public meeting was held in Manchester the following year. It attracted 265 members aged 14 to 76, and 232 attended the dinner after the meeting. By 1853, it had 889 members.

In 1849, members in London met and resolved to promote vegetarianism in the capital. In September, they launched The Vegetarian Messenger, priced at one penny, with a monthly circulation of almost 5,000 copies. The society made publications available on the subject, sometimes with lectures.

Following the deaths of Simpson, Brotherton, and their American colleague Alcott, the vegetarian movement declined. Membership numbers fell during the 1860s and 1870s, with 125 members remaining by 1870.

==== London Food Reform Society ====
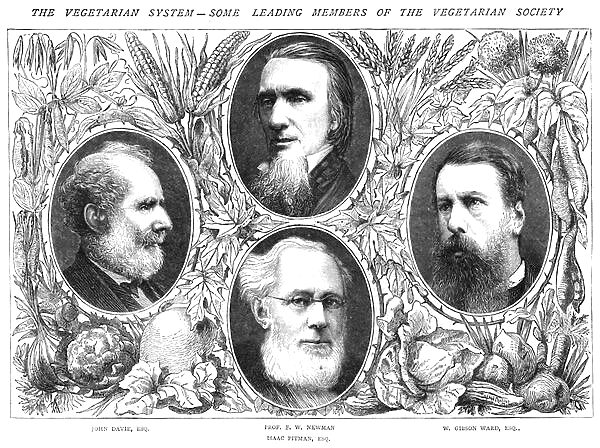
Francis William Newman (1805–1897), Isaac Pitman (1813–1897), William Gibson Ward (1819–1882), and John Davie (1800–1891), leading members of the Vegetarian Society

The London Food Reform Society (LFRS) was founded in 1875 with the support of Martin Nunn, an advocate of cooperation and industrial reform. It held free bi-monthly lectures and debates at Franklin Hall. John E. B. Mayor served as its president and was succeeded by W. J. Monk, when Mayor became president of the Vegetarian Society.

The LFRS's Food Reform Magazine criticised the Vegetarian Society in Manchester for what it saw as insufficient support. Manchester members regarded the existing organisation as adequate, while London vegetarians disagreed and considered moving the national offices to London.

Debates in 1882 and 1883 about broadening the society's scope met criticism over likely opposition and funding problems. The LFRS briefly renamed itself the National Food Reform Society until October 1885, when the Vegetarian Society paid its debts and made it an auxiliary in London. This led to the loss of the LFRS's subscription list interest, the closure of its office, and the creation of an independent auxiliary. In 1888, the auxiliary regained its independence as the London Vegetarian Society.

==== Dietary policy debates and growth ====
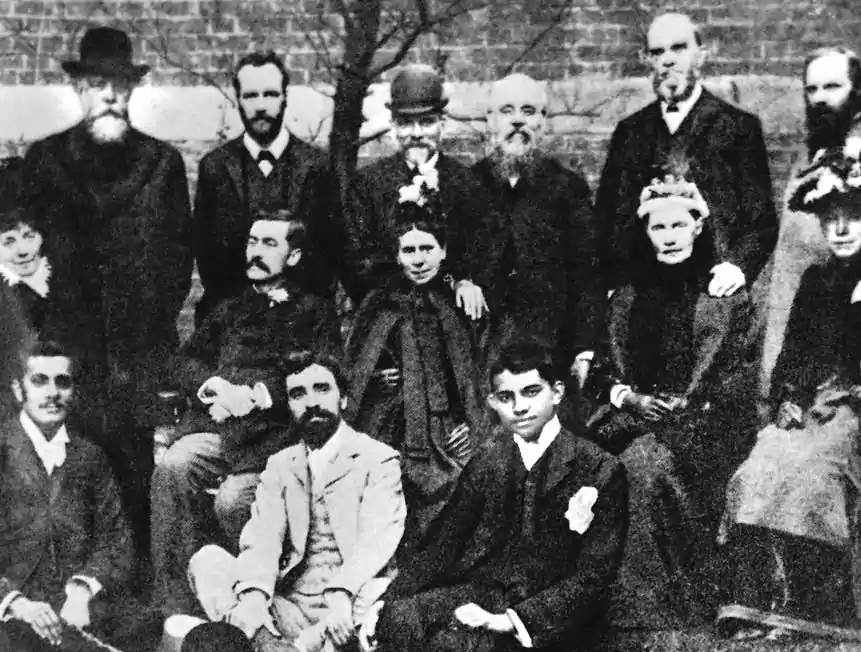
The London Vegetarian Society in 1891, including Mahatma Gandhi, Josiah Oldfield and May Yates

From its beginning, the Vegetarian Society was influenced by members of the Bible Christian Church in Salford, who supported the inclusion of eggs, dairy products, and honey in the vegetarian diet on biblical grounds. The Church did not argue for the reduction or elimination of these foods.

In the early 1850s, the London Vegetarian Association (LVA) was established as a local branch of the Vegetarian Society and became associated with a form of vegetarianism that excluded animal products such as eggs and dairy. Led by William Horsell, a former secretary of the national Society, the LVA was influenced by the Alcott House community, which had promoted a plant-based diet. This differed from the ovo-lacto vegetarianism supported by many Society members in Manchester, including those connected with the Bible Christian Church. In 1856, Horsell was replaced by a secretary closer to the national leadership, and the LVA appears to have declined shortly afterwards. The group has been described as an early example of disagreement within the British vegetarian movement over animal-derived foods.

Henry Stephens Salt argued in his 1886 work A Plea for Vegetarianism that the main aim of vegetarians should be the abolition of flesh-meat, while acknowledging that dairy products and eggs were unnecessary and could be given up in the future. Salt argued for avoiding unhealthy, expensive, and unwholesome foods, rather than only eliminating animal products.

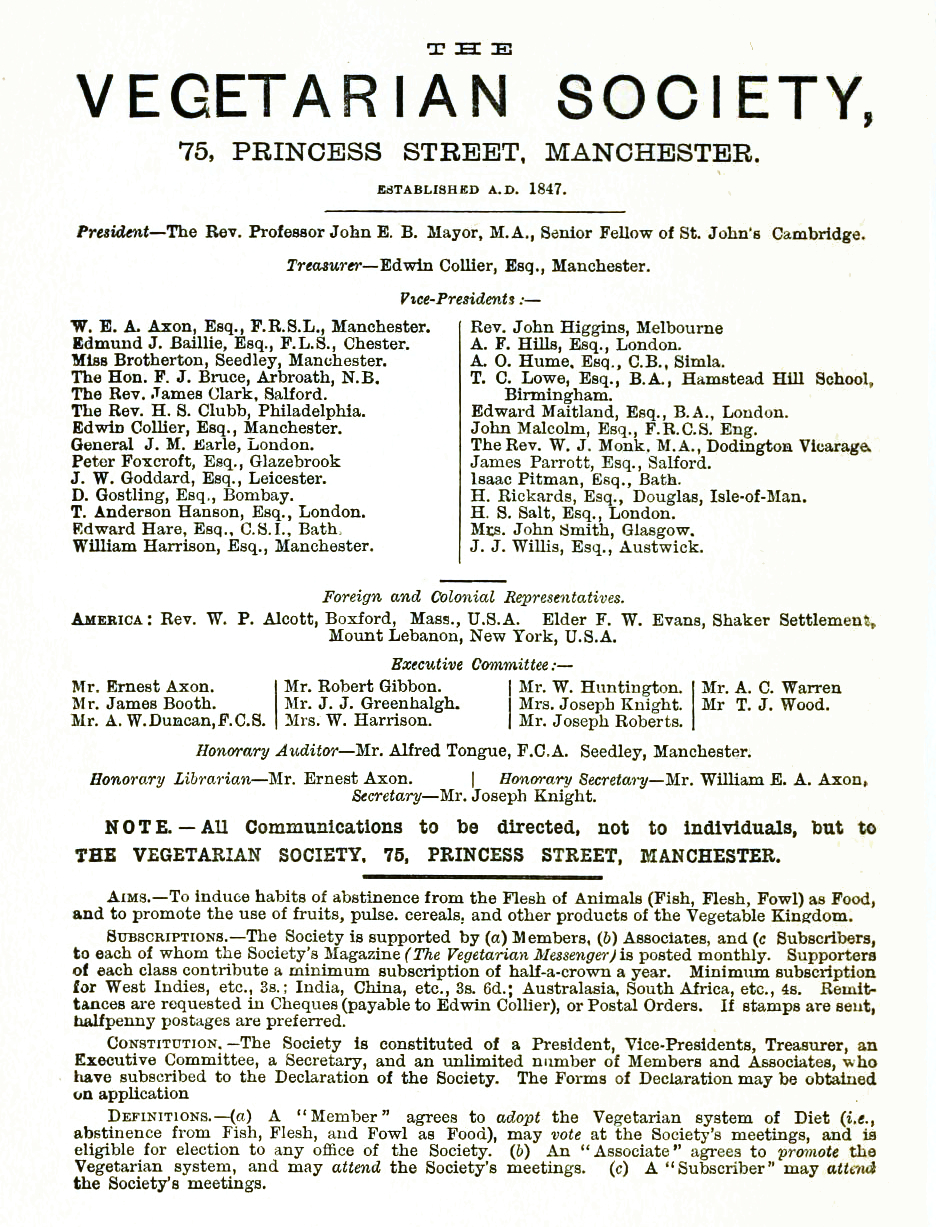
Presidents and vice-presidents of the Vegetarian Society in 1891

Francis William Newman served as president of the Vegetarian Society from 1873 to 1883. He made associate membership possible for people who were not completely vegetarian, including people who ate chicken or fish. Newman rejected raw food vegetarianism as fanatical. He believed that abstinence from meat, fish and fowl should be the only position advocated by the Society, and that it should not be associated with other reform ideas. He was also against the abandonment of salt and seasonings.

Under Newman's presidency, the Society's income and membership increased. From 1875 to 1896, membership rose to 2,159, with 1,785 associate members. Around 1897, its membership was about 5,000. On associate membership, Newman wrote:

It occurs to me to ask whether certain grades of profession might not be allowed within our Society, which would give to it far greater material support, enable it to circulate its literature, and at the same time retain the instructive spectacle of a select band of stricter feeders... Yet, as our Society is at present (1871) constituted, all those friendly are shut out... But if they entered as Associates in the lowest grade... they might be drawn on gradually, and would swell our funds, without which we can do nothing.

==== Daisy Society ====
In 1883, the Society established the Daisy Society, the first children's vegetarian organisation in Britain. Open to vegetarians under the age of 14, the branch was intended to introduce children to vegetarianism and encourage them to understand its principles. The name "Daisy Society" was suggested by Society member W. M. Wright in 1884 and formally adopted the following year. In January 1893, the Society began publishing The Daisy Basket, a quarterly magazine for the branch edited by Joseph Knight. Eight issues appeared between January 1893 and October 1894. The magazine was then discontinued after its readership proved lower than expected, despite financial support from a bequest by Matilda Cooper.

==== Manchester and London Vegetarian Societies ====
If anybody said that I should die if I did not take beef tea or mutton, even on medical advice, I would prefer death. That is the basis of my vegetarianism.

— Mahatma Gandhi, to the London Vegetarian Society on 20 November 1931

Relations between the Society in Manchester and the London branch were strained by disagreements over the definition of vegetarianism and over required approval of "advanced" literature by the Society. In 1888, the London branch split and formed the London Vegetarian Society (LVS), also known as the London Vegetarian Association. After this, the Vegetarian Society was often called the Manchester Vegetarian Society (MVS).

The first president of the LVS was the raw food advocate Arnold Hills. Other members included Thomas Allinson and Mahatma Gandhi. Members of the LVS were considered more radical than the MVS.

The newly independent society set out its aims in its journal, The Vegetarian, funded by Arnold Hills. It planned a Charing Cross Vegetarian Hotel and Restaurant. It also had branches in Oxford, Nottingham, Brighton, Guildford, and Reading. In 1889, the LVS and Vegetarian offices moved to the Congregational Memorial Hall, which became a meeting place for reform groups. Specialist societies were formed for children, athletes, and other groups, and vegetarian restaurants were used as meeting places. In 1889, the LVS created a national Vegetarian Federal Union, despite opposition from the MVS. By 1901, 21 societies had been established, coordinated from 1895 by the LVS.

=== 20th century ===
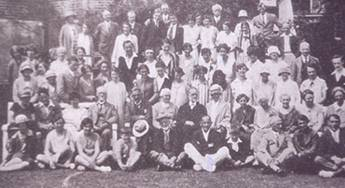
Vegetarian Society holiday centre in the 1920s

In 1907, James Christopher Street, J. Stenson Hooker, Ernest Nyssens and Eustace Miles were speakers at the 60th anniversary of the Vegetarian Society in Manchester. In 1920, the MVS hosted a summer school at Arnold House, Llanddulas, with around 70 attendees each week. Both societies organised holidays and outings for vegetarians, and the MVS's May meetings remained annual events after World War II.

World War I was a difficult period for vegetarians; no allowance was made for vegetarians in the armed forces.

During World War II, the Committee of Vegetarian Interests was established, with members from the two Vegetarian Societies, health food manufacturers, and retailers, to negotiate with the Ministry of Food. During the war, the blockade of the United Kingdom led to food shortages, and the government became closely involved in the diet of civilians. Food was rationed, with ration coupons required to buy rationed goods. Vegetarians who registered with their local Food Office received special ration books. These had no meat ration, but included more ration coupons for cheese, eggs, and nuts. About 100,000 people were officially registered as vegetarians in the United Kingdom during the war.

Meat rations during the war were small, to increase the food supply. Many meals were vegetarian, and the government promoted vegetarian recipes. The population ate more cereals and vegetables, and less meat. Many people retained wartime eating habits after the war. There was also public interest in nutrition and diet, and the effects of eating less meat.

In the 1950s, vegetarian cuisine became more popular. Walter Fleiss, who owned the Vega restaurant near Leicester Square in London, lobbied for the inclusion of a vegetarian category in the Salon Culinaire Food Competition. The Society sponsored the event and later competitions.

==== Founding of The Vegan Society ====
The inclusion of eggs and dairy in a vegetarian diet was a long-running topic of debate within the Society. In 1944, Donald Watson, a member of the LVS, suggested creating a separate group for people who followed a dairy- and egg-free diet. This led to the establishment of The Vegan Society.

==== Reunification ====
In the 1950s and 1960s, the MVS and LVS began working together, with calls for unification. In 1958, their magazines combined to become The British Vegetarian. They reunited in 1969 as the Vegetarian Society of the United Kingdom. Their headquarters were established at Parkdale, Altrincham, Greater Manchester. The organisation became a registered charity in September that year.

==== Advocacy efforts ====
In the 1950s, Frank Wokes founded the Vegetarian Nutritional Research Centre in Watford, working closely with the Society to promote research on vegetarian nutrition and health. The centre was later absorbed by the Society, and its research was published in journals, magazines, and newspapers.

In 1969, the Society introduced its seedling logo. In 1986, it introduced a scheme allowing manufacturers to use the logo on foods that met its vegetarian guidelines. Its accreditation criteria state that food must be free from animal flesh, slaughterhouse byproducts, and cross-contamination with non-vegetarian products; must not be tested on animals; and must use only GMO-free and free-range eggs, with specified welfare standards. The scheme led to the use of vegetarian symbols on food packaging.

In 1982, the Vegetarian Society launched the Cordon Vert Cookery School. In 1991, the Society hosted the first National Vegetarian Week, which has been held in most years since. Vegfest, introduced in 1997, is an annual event in central Manchester.

In 1995, the Society produced the documentary Devour the Earth, written by Tony Wardle and narrated by Paul McCartney. McCartney became a patron of the society in the same year.

=== 21st century ===
The Vegetarian Society Awards began in 2001 and recognised businesses and services for vegetarians in the United Kingdom. The first ceremony took place at the Grosvenor House Hotel in London, with later events at the Waldorf Hotel and the Magic Circle headquarters. These early events were open to members and the public, and included fundraising activities such as celebrity auctions and raffles, with prizes donated by vegetarian-friendly companies.

In 2003, the Society launched a "Fishconception" campaign after a survey found that many restaurants, canteens, and hospitals mistakenly believed that vegetarians eat fish. The campaign sought to correct this misconception and advise the catering industry on vegetarian standards.

In 2017, the Vegetarian Society launched Veggie Lotto, described as the first vegetarian and vegan lottery in the United Kingdom. Tickets are priced at £1, with 50p allocated to the Society. Funds raised support training for caterers, free courses for community groups and vulnerable people, and the promotion of vegetarian and vegan food.

Historian Ina Zweiniger-Bargielowska has written that "against the background of growing concern about the environment, animal rights, and food safety the society has flourished in recent decades."

In 2024, the Vegetarian Society announced a rebrand. It adopted a new logo, magazine branding and website. In the same year, the Society moved its head office to Ancoats, Manchester. In 2025, the Vegetarian Society opened COOK in the former Ancoats electricity sub-station as a cooking centre, supper club, and event space.

== Publications ==
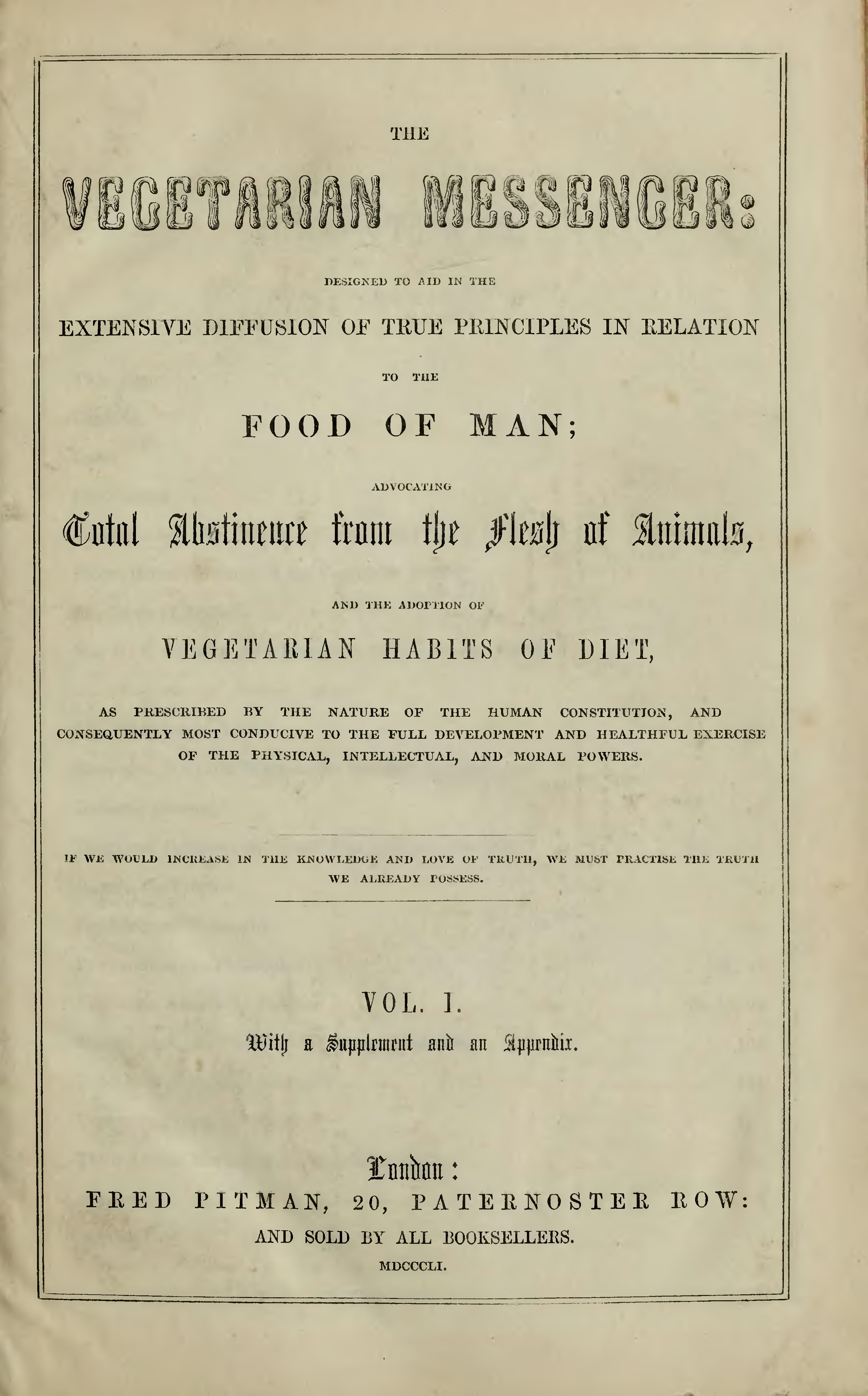
Title page of the first volume of the Vegetarian Messenger (1849)

The Vegetarian Society has issued several periodicals since its founding. Its first was William Horsell's The Vegetarian Advocate (1848–1850). Following doctrinal differences, it was superseded by James Simpson's The Vegetarian Messenger (1849–1860), which was succeeded by The Dietetic Reformer and Vegetarian Messenger (1861–1897; titled The Vegetarian Messenger from 1887). Later titles included The Vegetarian Messenger and Health Review (1898–1952), The Vegetarian (1953–1958), The British Vegetarian (1959–1971), The Vegetarian (1971–1976), The New Vegetarian (1977–1978), Alive (1978–1980), and The Vegetarian (1980–2024). Its current membership magazine, The Pod, is published three times a year.

During the 1870s and 1880s, contributors to The Dietetic Reformer and Vegetarian Messenger often used biological evolution in their arguments, interpreting it through a teleological lens to support vegetarian ideas.

Women including Dr Anna Kingsford (1846–1888), Dr Frances Hoggan (1843–1927), Annie Besant (1847–1933), Chandos Leigh Hunt Wallace (1854–1927), and Beatrice Lindsay lectured on vegetarianism, and their names and work appeared regularly in The Vegetarian Messenger. In 1885, Lindsay, a graduate of Girton College, Cambridge, became the first woman to edit the Society's journal, then titled The Dietetic Reformer and Vegetarian Messenger.

== Presidents ==
1847–1859	James Simpson
1859–1870	William Harvey
1870–1873	James Haughton
1873–1884	Francis William Newman
1884–1910	John E. B. Mayor
1911–1913	William E. A. Axon
1914–1933	Ernest Bell
1933–1938	Peter Freeman
1938–1959	W. A. Sibly
1960–1987	Gordon Latto
1987–1989	Isabel Wilson
1990–1994	Neville Hall
1994–1996	Kathy Silk
1996–1997	Brian Feast
1999–2005	Maxwell G. Lee

== Patrons ==
The Vegetarian Society has had several patrons. Rose Elliot, who became a patron in 2002, is the author of more than fifty vegetarian cookbooks and received an MBE in 1999. Actor Jerome Flynn became a patron after adopting a vegetarian lifestyle at 18. Musician Paul McCartney and his late wife Linda became patrons in 1995. Fashion designer Stella McCartney and photographer Mary McCartney joined their parents as patrons. Television presenter Wendy Turner-Webster, a vegan, became a patron in 2004.

== See also ==
- List of vegetarian and vegan organizations
- European Vegetarian Union
- International Vegetarian Union
- North American Vegetarian Society
- Vegetarian Society (Singapore)
