= Joseph Knight (vegetarian) =

English social reformer and writer (c. 1854–1928)

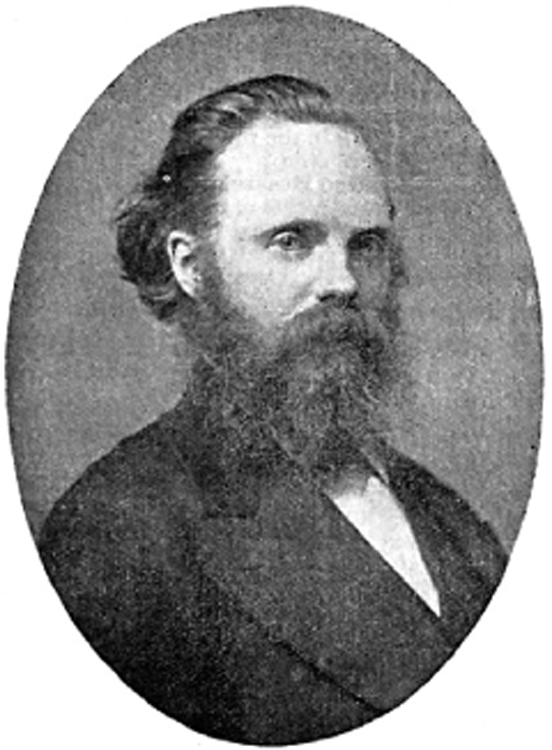
- Knight, c. 1893
- Born: c. 1854; Spitalfields, Middlesex, England
- Died: 24 January 1928 (aged 74); Hereford, England
- Occupations: Social reformer; writer
- Organizations: Vegetarian Society; Scottish Vegetarian Society
- Known for: Vegetarianism and temperance advocacy
- Notable work: The Daisy Basket (1893–1894)
- Spouse: Mary Ann Cooper (m. 1874; died 1915)

Joseph Knight (c. 1854 – 24 January 1928) was an English social reformer and writer. He was active in the vegetarian and temperance movements in the United Kingdom. Knight joined the Vegetarian Society in 1881 and was its secretary from 1885 to 1895. In 1883, he helped to establish the Scottish Vegetarian Society. He wrote pamphlets and articles on vegetarianism, lectured on the subject, and edited The Daisy Basket (1893–1894), a children's vegetarian magazine.

== Biography ==
=== Early life ===
Knight was born around 1854 in Spitalfields, Middlesex, the son of William and Eliza Knight. He was a member of the Band of Hope from the age of six.

=== Vegetarianism and temperance ===
Knight became involved in the vegetarian and temperance movements as an adult. He joined the Vegetarian Society in 1881 and held several roles in the organisation. In 1885, he became its secretary, a position he held until 1895. Knight helped to establish the Scottish Vegetarian Society in Glasgow in 1883 and served as a vice-president.

Knight wrote pamphlets and articles on vegetarianism. He also lectured on the subject. In 1889, the Leicester Vegetarian Society was re-established after a lecture by Knight. At a Vegetarian Society conference in Sheffield later that year, he gave an address titled "The Biblical Aspect of Vegetarianism", in which he argued that the Bible generally supported abstinence from animal flesh. Other attendees included William E. A. Axon, James Clark, Peter Foxcroft, and R. S. Wilson.

In an 1894 lecture at Crewe, Knight defined vegetarianism as living on products of the vegetable kingdom, with or without dairy products and eggs, and excluding fish, fowl, and red meat. He argued that vegetarianism was compatible with the use of animal products that did not involve the death of animals, and that a vegetarian diet was more economical and healthier than a meat-based diet. A satirical article in Truth mocked Knight's opposition to domestic cookery, saying that it inferred from a letter by him that he ate vegetables raw and "preferentially the Scotch thistle".

=== Children's vegetarian writing ===
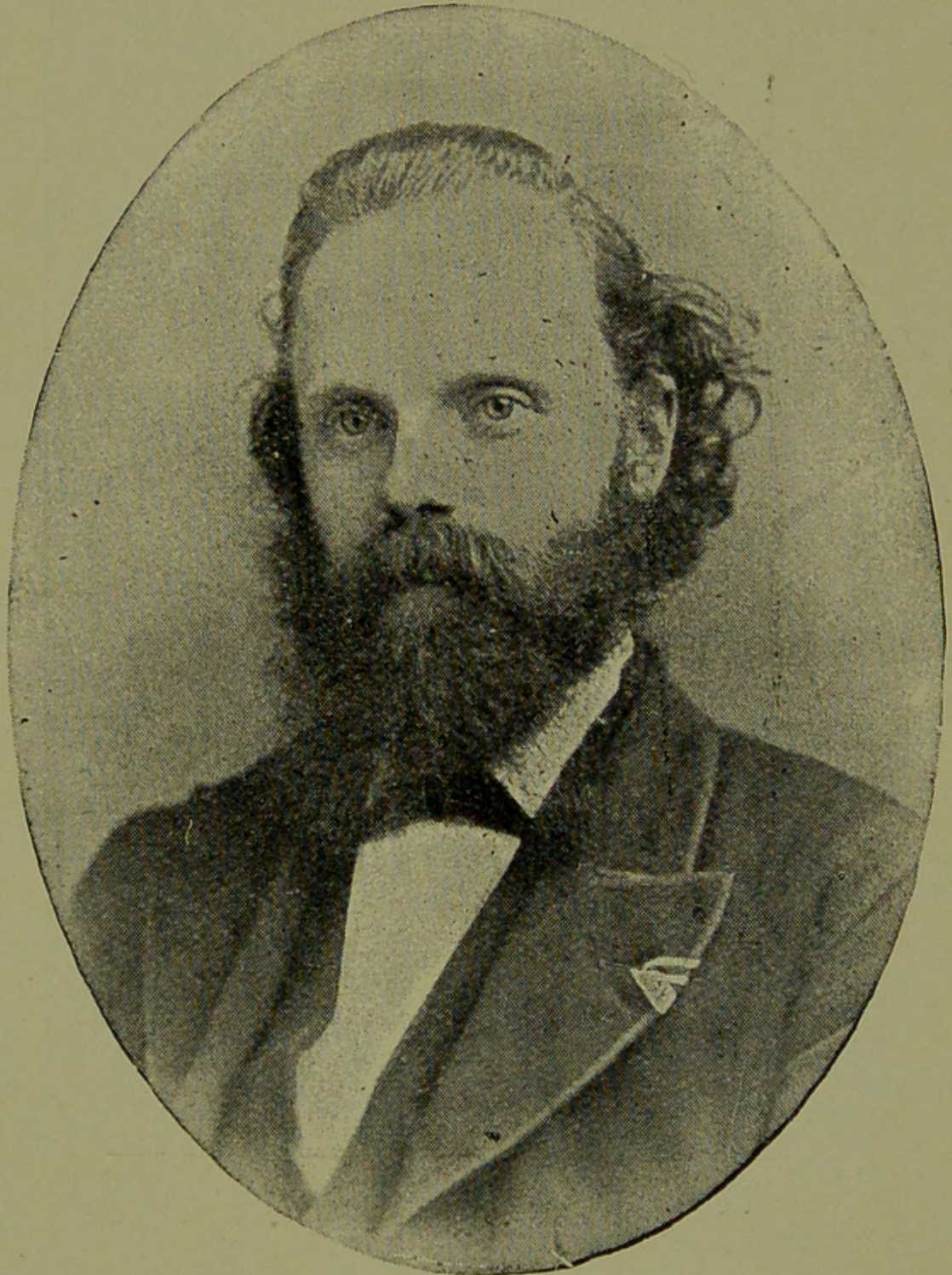
Knight in Fifty Years of Food Reform (1898)

Founded in 1883, the Daisy Society was Britain's first vegetarian group for children. In 1893, Beatrice Lindsay, editor of The Dietetic Reformer and Vegetarian Messenger, launched The Daisy Basket, the first vegetarian magazine for children in Britain. Knight edited the magazine from 1893 to 1894 under the pseudonym "Uncle John". The magazine published book reviews, letters, short fiction, and poetry.

=== Personal life and death ===
Knight lived in Manchester and later worked as a journalist in Hereford.

Knight married Mary Ann Cooper (d. 1915) in 1874. She lectured on vegetarianism and wrote on the subject under the name Minnie Knight.

Knight died on 24 January 1928, aged 74, at Hereford General Hospital. His death followed complications from a fractured thigh sustained in a fall on snow the previous December.

== Publications ==
- (ed.) The Daisy Basket (Manchester: Vegetarian Society, 1893–1894; OCLC 877750239)
- Cheap and Nutritious Food (Manchester: Vegetarian Society, 1885; OCLC 841494663)
- Vegetarianism in Practice (first published in 1889 as a chapter in Manchester Vegetarian Lectures; later published as a pamphlet)
- (ed.) Vegetarianism, With Special Reference to its Connection with Temperance in Drinking (Melbourne: George Robertson; Manchester: Vegetarian Society, 1889)
- Vegetarianism in Relation to Health (Manchester: Vegetarian Society, 1889)
- Suggestions Touching the Advocacy of Vegetarianism (Manchester: Vegetarian Society, c. 1900)
- Vegetarianism: What it is, etc. (London: Richard J. James, 1903; OCLC 1063856574)
- A Few Thought Rays Captured While Looking Towards Truth (1903; OCLC 314887148)

== See also ==
- History of vegetarianism
- Vegetarianism in the Victorian era
- Vegetarianism in the United Kingdom
- Temperance movement in the United Kingdom
