= Janet Armytage =

English writer and social reformer (1872–1890)

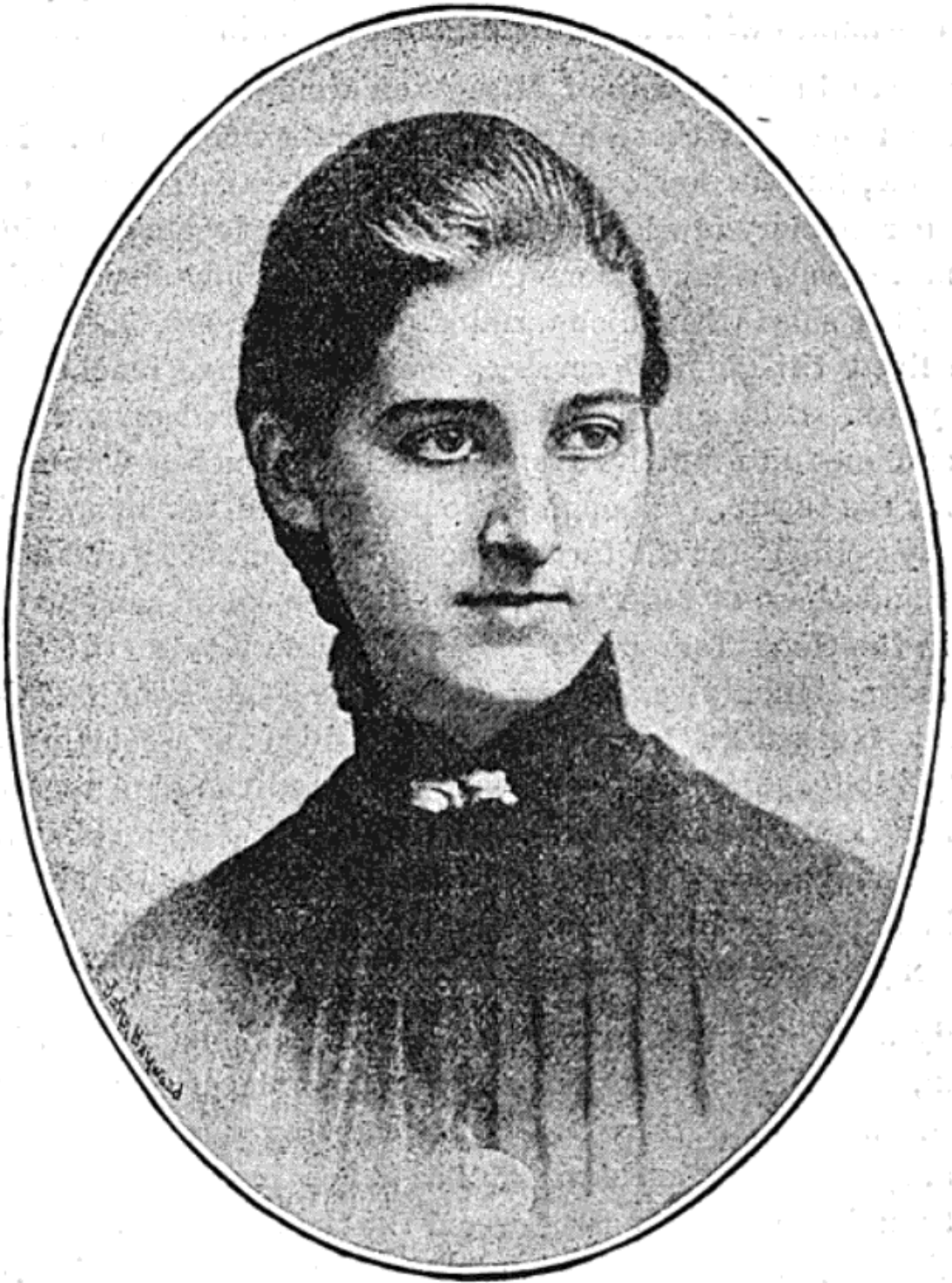
- Armytage in 1889
- Born: Katharine Janet Armytage Axon; 2 December 1872; Rusholme, Lancashire, England
- Died: 25 October 1890 (aged 17); Bowdon, Cheshire, England
- Resting place: St Paul's, Kersal
- Occupations: Writer; social reformer
- Notable work: The Tenants of Johnson's Court (1891)
- Father: William E. A. Axon

Katharine Janet Armytage Axon (2 December 1872 – 25 October 1890), who wrote as Janet Armytage, was an English writer and social reformer. She wrote stories, sketches, and translations for periodicals including The Woman's World, Alliance News, National Temperance Mirror, Onward, Temperance Star, Almonds and Raisins, and The Vegetarian Messenger. She taught at the Charter Street Ragged School in Manchester and was active in philanthropic, temperance, and vegetarianism work. Her collection The Tenants of Johnson's Court was published after her death.

== Biography ==
=== Early life ===
Armytage was born Katharine Janet Armytage Axon on 2 December 1872 in Rusholme, Lancashire. She was the third daughter of William E. A. Axon and Jane Axon (née Woods). According to an obituary in the Manchester Weekly Times and Examiner, she had "never been altogether strong" and had inherited a tendency to tuberculosis from her mother.

=== Writing career ===
Armytage showed an aptitude for literary work from childhood. She wrote under the name Janet Armytage. Her work appeared in The Woman's World, Alliance News, National Temperance Mirror, Onward, Temperance Star, Almonds and Raisins, and The Vegetarian Messenger. It included translations from German, stories, and sketches. Her father edited The Vegetarian Messenger from 1888 to 1894, and was for a time assisted in that work by Armytage.

Armytage's collection The Tenants of Johnson's Court, a volume of tales and sketches, was being prepared for publication at the time of her death and appeared posthumously. Reviewing the book in Papers of the Manchester Literary Club, George Milner described it as "the first and only volume" produced by Armytage and wrote that its stories were sketches of life in the Manchester slums, with which her work at a ragged school had made her familiar. The volume included a biographical sketch by Beatrice Lindsay.

In September 1888, Armytage became a member of the Lancashire and Cheshire Antiquarian Society.

=== Philanthropic, temperance, and vegetarian work ===
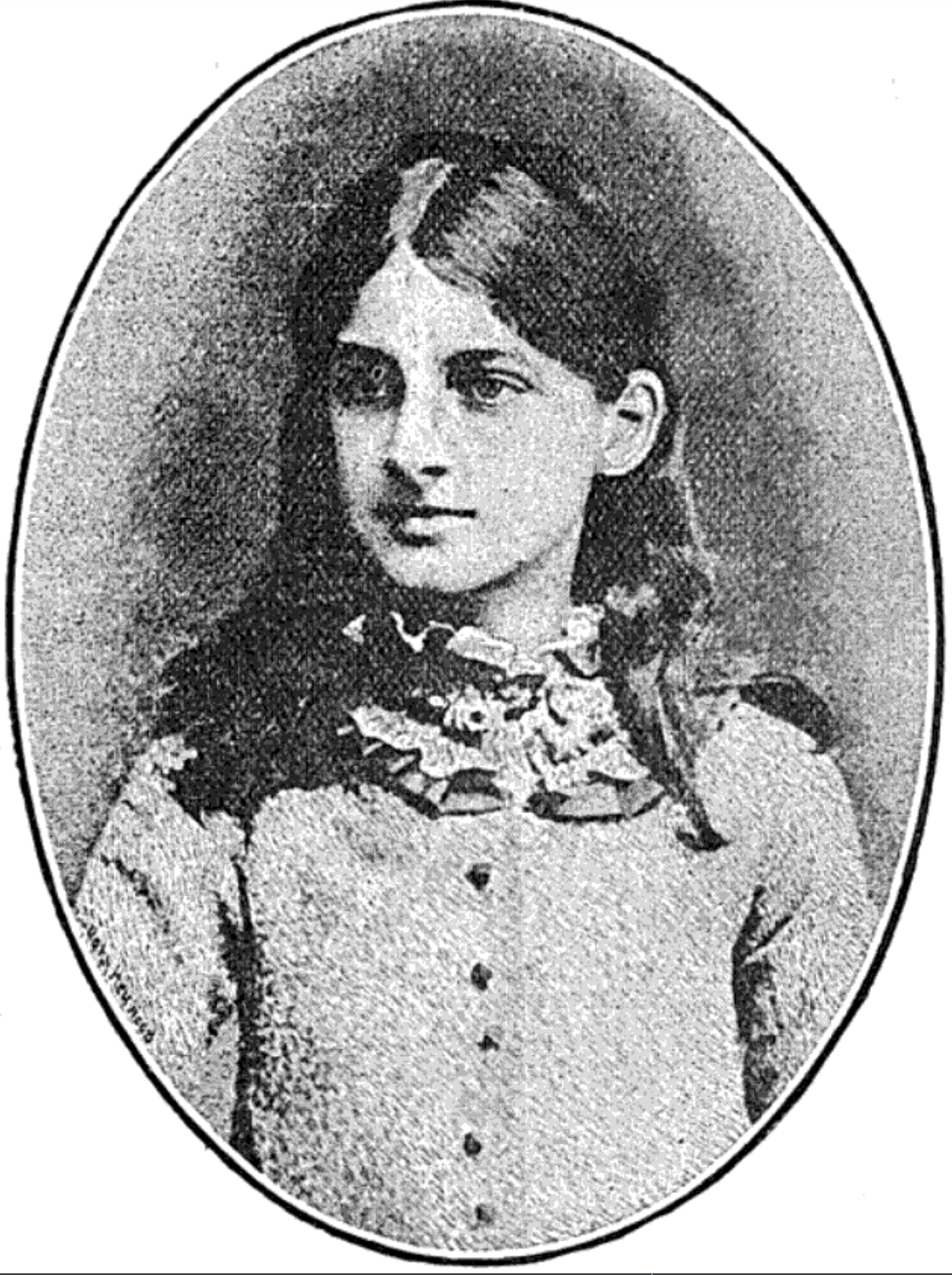
Armytage, c. 1884

Armytage taught at the Charter Street Ragged School in Angel Meadow, Manchester. She took part in temperance work through the Independent Order of Good Templars, in which she was vice-templar of the Concilio et Labore Lodge, Manchester, convention vice-templar of No. 1 Convention, South-East Lancashire District, and an associate member of the City Lodge, Manchester. Her services were used for instruction and entertainment, including as a lecturer, essayist, and pianist. She provided inexpensive meals for poor children, assisted with soup kitchens in John Street during the winter, and served for a time as lady superintendent for Miss Romley Wright at a cookery school at the Trevelyan Hotel. She also supported the Salford Sunday lectures movement at Victoria Hall, Salford. She corresponded with philanthropic agencies connected with British soldiers in India and elsewhere.

According to Joseph Knight, writing for The Temperance Worker and Reciter, Armytage had been vegetarian for five and a half years by the time of her death, following the example of her father, who had followed the practice for more than 22 years. The same account stated that vegetarianism was familiar to her throughout her life and often formed part of her advocacy at Good Templar lodges. She was for a time a member of the executive of the Vegetarian Society and took part in promoting its work.

=== Death ===
Armytage died from tuberculosis at her father's home in Bowdon, Cheshire, on 25 October 1890, aged 17. She was interred at St Paul's, Kersal, after a funeral service on 29 October at the Bible Christian Church in Cross Lane, Salford, conducted by Rev. James Clark. The funeral was attended by representatives of the Manchester and Salford Temperance Union, United Kingdom Alliance, Vegetarian Society, and the Independent Order of Good Templars.

== Publications ==
- The Tenants of Johnson's Court. Introduction by Beatrice Lindsay. London: Partridge & Co. 1891.
- Axon, Ernest, ed. (1892). "Kersal Moor". Bygone Lancashire. Simpkin, Marshall, Hamilton, Kent & Co.

== See also ==
- History of vegetarianism
- Vegetarianism in the Victorian era
- Vegetarianism in the United Kingdom
- Women and vegetarianism and veganism advocacy
- Temperance movement in the United Kingdom
