= Mary Ann Knight (vegetarian) =

English vegetarianism activist and writer (c. 1835–1915)

- Born: Mary Ann Cooper c. 1835; Middlesex, England
- Died: 20 February 1915 (aged 80); Broad Oak, Herefordshire, England
- Other names: Minnie Knight; Mrs. Joseph Knight
- Occupations: Activist; writer
- Movement: Vegetarianism
- Spouse: Joseph Knight (m. 1874)

Mary Ann Knight (née Cooper; c. 1835 – 20 February 1915), who wrote as Minnie Knight and Mrs. Joseph Knight, was an English vegetarianism activist and writer. She lectured on vegetarianism and contributed to vegetarian publications. Her husband, Joseph Knight, was a secretary of the Vegetarian Society.

== Biography ==
Knight was born Mary Ann Cooper around 1835 in Middlesex. She married Joseph Knight in 1874, a secretary of the Vegetarian Society.

In 1884, while living at St Saviour's Road, Leicester, Knight joined the Vegetarian Society. She lectured on vegetarianism at Hinckley and at her home in Leicester. She was listed among the expected speakers at the Vegetarian Society's May Meetings at Memorial Hall, London, in 1888, alongside Joseph Knight and other speakers. She presented the paper "Women and Vegetarianism".

Knight wrote under the name "Minnie Knight". In 1885, Almonds and Raisins published her dialogue between two vegetarians, in which servants adopt vegetarianism after discussion and the receipt of vegetarian tracts. In 1893, her story "Grace Armitage's Party" appeared in the first issue of The Daisy Basket. In 1900, she published vegetarian recipes in The Vegetarian Messenger as "Mrs. Joseph Knight".

Knight lived in Manchester before moving with her husband to Broad Oak, near Hereford, around 1896. She died at Broad Oak on 20 February 1915, aged 80, after three years of increasing suffering from rheumatism. Her funeral took place at Broad Oak on 27 February, and she was buried in a plot associated with the Primitive Methodist Chapel.

== See also ==
- History of vegetarianism
- Vegetarianism in the Victorian era
- Vegetarianism in the United Kingdom
- Women and vegetarianism and veganism advocacy
