= Charles A. Hall =

English Swedenborgian minister

- Born: Charles Albert Hall; 11 July 1872; Eastfield, Peterborough
- Died: 27 August 1965 (aged 93); Storrington
- Occupation: Swedenborgian minister
- Spouse: Annie Unwin (m. 1896)

Charles Albert Hall FRMS (11 July 1872 – 27 August 1965) was an English naturalist and Swedenborgian minister.

== Career ==
Hall was born at Eastfield, Peterborough and was educated at Deacon's School and New Church College in London. He was a pastor at Hull, Bristol, Paisley, Southport and London from 1896 to 1935.

Hall was minister of the Paisley Society from 1909 to 1919. He managed a camping expedition on the shores of Loch Fyne which included nature rambles. Dugald Semple who attended the expedition described it as a "joyful experience, for it was so far my best introduction to the simple life".

In the 1920s he was minister of the New Jerusalem Church in Southport. He was the editor of the 17 volume "Peeps at Nature” series published by A & C Black between 1911 and 1935. His 1914 volume Common British Beetles was widely cited. He was a Fellow of the Royal Microscopical Society.

Hall was the editor of the New Church Herald for 22 years. He lectured on the teachings of Swedenborg. Hall resided at Longbury Hill, Storrington. He died on 27 August 1965.

Hall was supportive of naturopathy and edited the Scottish Health Reformer. He authored the 3 volume The Art of Being Happy, The Art of Being Healthy and The Art of Being Successful.

== Anti-vivisection ==
Hall was an anti-vivisectionist. In the 1940s, he was president of the Worthing branch of the British Union for the Abolition of Vivisection. In 1962, he was vice-president of the Storrington and District branch. Hall argued that vivisection was unethical and incompatible with Christianity.

Hall was a vegetarian and a member of the General Council of the Order of the Golden Age. In 1903, he was editor of the Scottish Vegetarian Society's magazine Health, Food and Cookery.

== Personal life ==
Hall married Annie Unwin in 1896; they had two sons.

== Selected publications ==
- How to Use the Microscope: A Guide for the Novice (1912)
- The Romance of the Rocks (1912)
- Wild Flowers and their Wonderful Ways (1916)
- They Do Not Die (1918)
- Bird Life of the Seasons (1920)
- Common British Beetles (1925)
- The Open Book of Nature (1925)
- Pond Life (1928)
- Birds' Eggs and Nests (1935)
- Wild Flowers in their Haunts (1944)
