= H. S. Bathgate =

Scottish plasterer and social reformer (1853–1936)

- Born: Henry Shiels Bathgate; 7 December 1853; Rutherglen, Lanarkshire, Scotland
- Died: 26 May 1936 (aged 82); Mount Vernon, Glasgow, Scotland
- Other name: Harry Bathgate
- Occupations: Plasterer; social reformer
- Organizations: Vegetarian Society of Glasgow; Scottish Vegetarian Society (president; 1892–1929)
- Known for: Vegetarianism and peace activism
- Spouse: Violet Wilhelmina Gordon Murray (m. 1882; died 1935)
- Children: 6

Henry Shiels Bathgate (7 December 1853 – 26 May 1936), also known as Harry Bathgate, was a Scottish plasterer and social reformer active in the vegetarian and peace movements. Born in Rutherglen, Lanarkshire, he later lived in Mount Vernon, Glasgow, and worked as a master plasterer. His work included alterations to St Thomas Wesleyan Methodist Church (1892–1894) and the Southern District Fire Station (1916). Bathgate adopted a vegetarian diet after an illness in 1877, joined the Vegetarian Society of Glasgow in 1889, and was president of the Scottish Vegetarian Society from 1892 to 1929. He also supported Christian community work, including Sabbath School activities, and wrote in 1912 against the reliance on dairy products and eggs in vegetarian cookery.

== Biography ==
=== Early life ===
Henry Shiels Bathgate was born on 7 December 1853 in Rutherglen, Lanarkshire, and was baptised on 25 December. His parents were Charles Bathgate and Catherine Shiels.

=== Career ===
==== Plastering ====
Bathgate later lived in Mount Vernon, Glasgow, where he worked as a master plasterer. Directories for Glasgow listed him as an ornamental plasterer, with business addresses at 86 Whitevale Street in 1880 and 540 Duke Street from about 1890 to 1900. From 1892 to 1894, he worked on modifications and additions to St Thomas Wesleyan Methodist Church. In 1916, he worked on the new Southern District Fire Station.

==== Vegetarian activism ====
In 1877, following an illness, Bathgate was introduced to vegetarianism by a newspaper article. He was further influenced by the writings of Dr T. L. Nichols.

In 1889, he joined the Vegetarian Society of Glasgow. From 1892 to 1929, he served as president of the Scottish Vegetarian Society; after stepping down, he served as honorary president. He provided financial support to the vegetarian movement in Scotland. His work was described in The Vegetarian in 1896.

Bathgate attended the Vegetarian Society's diamond jubilee celebrations in Manchester in October 1907, where he addressed the conference and conveyed greetings from the Scottish Vegetarian Society.

In 1912, writing in The Vegetarian Messenger and Health Review, Bathgate criticised the prominence of dairy and eggs in vegetarian cookery, writing that "so much stress is laid on the value of milk, butter, cheese and eggs in our literature, one would almost think we could not live and be strong and well without them."

==== Other activities ====
Bathgate was involved in Christian community work, including Sabbath School activities, and supported the peace movement.

In 1889, Bathgate became a member of the Society of Deacons and Free Preseses of Glasgow.

=== Personal life and death ===
Bathgate was a lifelong teetotaller and non-smoker.

Bathgate married Violet Wilhelmina Gordon Murray on 29 September 1882 at Dennistoun, Glasgow. They had six children together; Violet died in 1935.

Bathgate died at Woodneuk, Mount Vernon, on 26 May 1936, aged 82. An obituary was published in The Vegetarian Messenger in July 1936.

== See also ==
- Dugald Semple, second president of the Scottish Vegetarian Society
- Vegetarianism in the Victorian era
