= Thomas Owen =

Thomas or Tom Owen may refer to:

== Law and politics ==
- Thomas ab Owen (by 1511–1575 or later), Welsh politician
- Thomas Owen (died 1598), English judge and politician, MP for Shrewsbury
- Thomas Owen (died 1661), English politician, MP for Shrewsbury
- Thomas Jefferson Vance Owen (1801–1835), American politician
- Thomas Owen (Launceston MP) (1840–1898), British politician, MP for Launceston, Cornwall
- Thomas Horner Owen (1873–1938), American jurist in Oklahoma
- Tom Owen (politician) (active since 1968), American historian and politician in Louisville, Kentucky

== Sports ==
- Thomas Owen (boxer) (1768–1843), English boxer
- Thomas Owen (footballer) (1861–?), Welsh footballer
- Tom Owen (speedway rider) (born 1951), English speedway rider
- Tom Owen (American football) (born 1952), American football quarterback
- Tom Owen-Evans (born 1997), English footballer

== Others ==
- Thomas Owen (priest) (1749–1812), Welsh Anglican priest and translator of works on agriculture
- Thomas Ellis Owen (1805–1862), English architect and developer
- Thomas Owen (vegetarian) (1833–1916), English bookseller and activist
- Thomas M. Owen (1866–1920), American archivist and historian
- Thomas Owen (author) (1910–2002), Belgian author of weird and supernatural fiction
- Thomas Richard Owen (1918–1990), Welsh geologist
- Tom Owen (actor) (1949–2022), British actor
