= Morris Krok =

South African health writer

- Born: April 28, 1931; South Africa
- Died: October 1, 2005 (aged 74)
- Known for: Fruitarianism

Morris Krok (28 April 1931 – October 2005) was a South African author, publisher and health educator.

== Biography ==
Background

Morris Krok was born in Johannesburg and brought up in Durban, South Africa. As a young man, he started to seek solutions for his health problems and was influenced by natural healing writers of the 20th century such as Vincent Priessnitz, Louis Kuhne, Harry Benjamin, Arnold Ehret, Dugald Semple, George R. Clements, Walter Siegmeister, Essie Honiball and Johnny Lovewisdom. He also studied new age, occult, esoteric, yogic, spiritual and metaphysical writings from the East. Krok migrated to California to develop his work and writings, dedicating his life to the quest for knowledge about health, vitality and higher consciousness. A regular marathon runner, Krok died from cancer of the leg in 2005, blaming "his problem on his terrible diet in his youth and on cooked food temptations from family".

Beliefs

In the 1950s, a popular South African newspaper featured a story about Krok's belief that fruit was the ideal food for humankind. In the 1990s and 2000s, David Klein Ph.D., publisher of Living Nutrition, chronicled Krok's famous sayings including "Man will always get colds if he persists in eating large quantities of mucous forming foods in the form of starch, dairy products and animal fats." and "Health is the balance between assimilation and elimination.” in the magazine. Central to Krok's thinking was that mucusless foods held the key to good health. In the article, A Yogic Perspective he describes how "To heal and avoid illness, one must alkalinize the body through a diet of predominately raw fruits and vegetables."

Writings

Krok wrote books on detoxification, internal purification, natural living, self-healing, fruitarianism, fasting, living foods, raw nutrition, physical culture, hatha yoga, meditation, deep breathing, higher consciousness, radiant energy, life extension and vitalism. As well as being an author, Krok published several books by other authors including Johanna Brandt, Otto Abramowski and Theos Bernard, through Essence of Health Publishers.

Golden Path

Krok's book Golden Path To Rejuvenation described how a non-toxic diet and the osmotic pressure of rainwater could detoxify and purify the membranes and tissues of the body. Krok believed that internal purification, was the direct and most effective way for a longer and youthful life. He described how not everything humans eat is used by the body, showing how accumulated wastes and toxins caused by an unnatural diet and other substances, result in illness and premature ageing. His internal purification programme was designed to help increase longevity and remain youthful. He believed internal cleansing in conjunction with plant foods was the 'golden path'. The book also explained the yogic vomit technique, a central part of the detoxification regime he endorsed.

Legacy

Krok was one of a series of 20th-century writers who wrote about fruitarianism, raw nutrition, fasting, detoxification, yoga and higher consciousness. His contemporaries included Brian Clement Ph.D., Dr. Douglas N. Graham, Viktoras Kulvinskas and Robert Gray. Authors who have endorsed Krok's writings in their books include John McCabe, Joe Alexander, Gary Null, Benito De Donno and David Wolfe.

== Criticisms ==
Morris Krok advocated a fruitarian diet in his writings as the optimal diet and described how at stages during his life, he lived "only on fruits". It is claimed that he later advised against a diet of "only fruit"; however, it was subsequently reported that Krok's diet consisted of "just fruit".

== Writings ==
Books and booklets written by Morris Krok, many published through Essence Of Health Publishers:

- Amazing New Health System: Inner Clean Way, 1978
- Amazing New Health System: Inner Clean Way, Essence of Health, Wandsbeck, South Africa, 2001, ISBN 0-620-27362-3
- Cream of Yoga, 1987 (booklet)
- Diary Of A Health & Truth Seeker, 1967, 1969
- Diet Health And Living On Air, 1973
- El Frugivorismo de Durban, Barcelona: Cuadernos De Naturismo, ISBN 84-300-2049-7, 1980
- Formula For Long Life, 1967, 1977 and 2001 (originally From The Deathbed To Boisterous Health)
- From The Deathbed To Boisterous Health, 1962, 1963
- Fruit: The Food And Medicine For Man, 1961 (alternate title The Conquest Of Disease)
- Fruit: The Food And Medicine For Man, Connecticut: O'mangod, 1967
- Golden Path To Rejuvenation: Life's Most Important Knowledge, 1964
- Hatha Yoga In Its Moods Multivarious, 1959
- Hatha Yoga: The Vibrant Science Of Life, 1975
- Health, Diet, and Living on Air (1964)
- Health Truths Eternal, 1964
- Health Truths Eternal (booklet)
- Metaphysical Diary, 1960s
- Mystic Story (booklet)
- The Greater Miracle of Life, 1964
- The Kindred Soul: Teachings Of Eternal Truth, 1968
- Pathway To Truth, 1974
- Raw Juice Therapy & Self-Help, 1967
- Science of Natural Healing (booklet), 1961
- Soul Knowledge, 1960s (formerly Revelations Of The New Age)
- The Conquest Of Disease, 1961
- The Fog Lifts - autobiography (unpublished)

== Essence Of Health publications ==
- Fast Way To Health - Frank Mccoy
- Fruitarian Diet & Physical Rejuvenation - Otto Abramowski
- Fruitarian System Of Healing - Otto Abramowski, 1976
- Fruitarianism: Compassionate Way To Transform Health - Hannah Hurnard
- Garden Of The Lord - Hannah Hurnard
- Gardening Without Digging - Albert Guest, 1973
- Hatha Yoga - Theos Bernard, 2001, ISBN 0-9584460-1-6
- Heaven Lies Within Us - Theos Bernard, 2002, ISBN 0-9584461-1-3
- I Live On Fruit - Essie Honiball, 2002
- My Healing Secret
- The Physiological Enigma of Woman: The Mystery Of Menstruation - Raymond Bernard
- Prenatal Origin Of Genius - Raymond W. Bernard, (Foreword and Edited by Morris Krok), 1962
- The Grape Cure - Joanna Brandt
- Yoga Gave Me Superior Health (Heaven Lies Within Us) - Theos Bernard
- Yoga System Of Health - Yogi Vithaldas

== Books cited by Morris Krok ==
- Autogbiography Of A Yogi - Paramhansa Yogananda
- Doctor's Disease And Health - Cyril Scott
- Everybody's Guide To Nature Cure - Harry Benjamin
- Folk Medicine - DeForest Clinton Jarvis
- Game Of Life - Florence Shinn
- Hatha Yoga - Theos Benard
- Healing By Water - T. Hartley Hennessy
- Heaven Lies Within Us - Theos Bernard
- Mucusless Diet Healing System - Arnold Ehret
- Nature The Healer - Vera Richter
- New Science Of Healing - Louis Kuhn
- A Plea for The Order of the Golden Age - H. J. Williams
- Pacifying Panicking People -
- Provoker - John Toby
- Raw Eating - Aterhov T. Hovannessian
- Science Of Breath - Yogi Ramacharaka
- Sunfood Way To Health - Dugald Semple
- Why Grow Old - Tony Officer
- Why slim - Khaled Hasan
- Street pocker - Kaleemi
