= Beatrice Lindsay =

English zoologist (1858–1917)

Beatrice Lindsay FLS
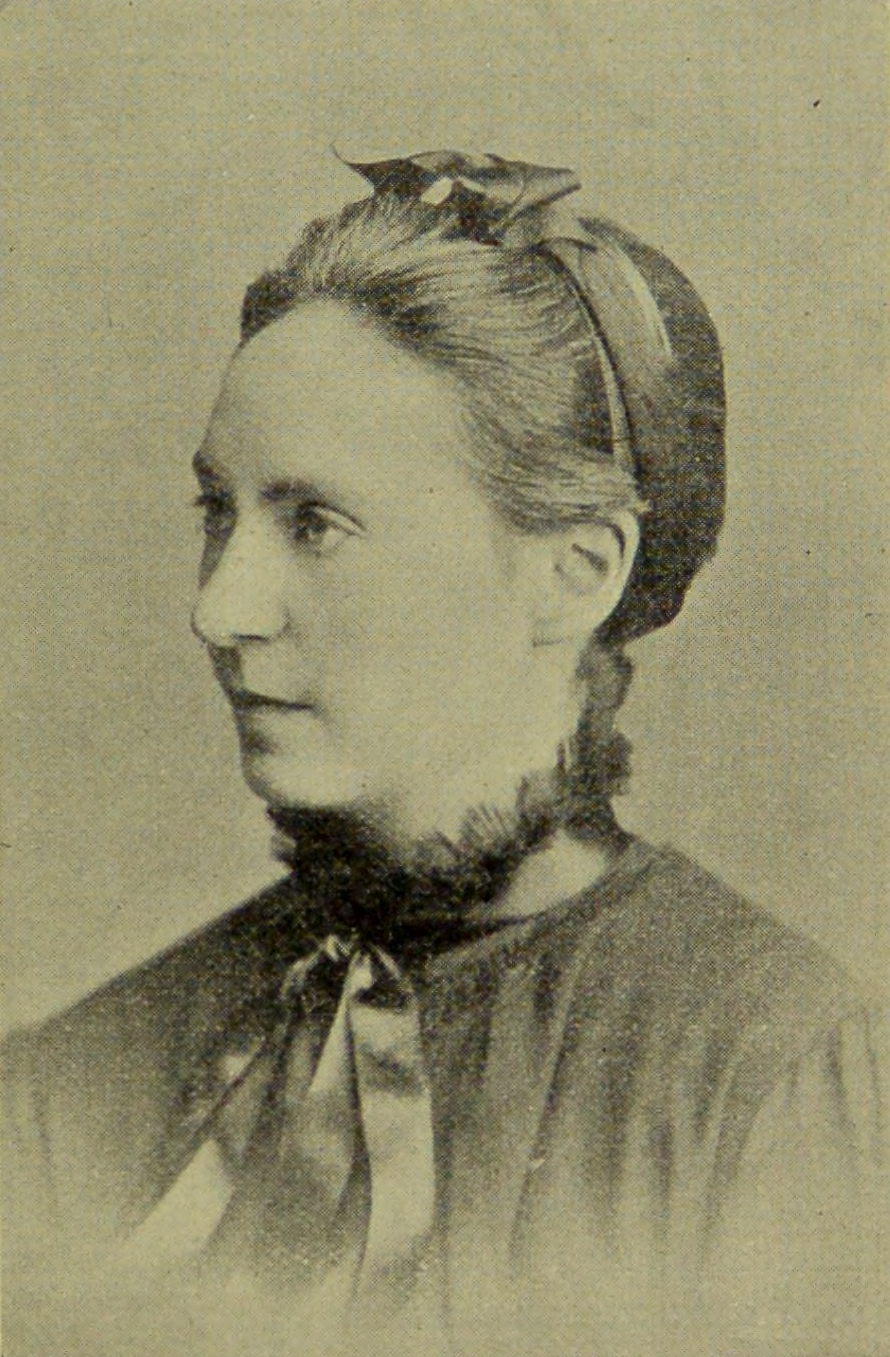
- Lindsay in Fifty Years of Food Reform (1898)
- Born: 3 October 1858; Chorlton-on-Medlock, Manchester, England
- Died: 16 December 1917 (aged 59); Onchan, Isle of Man
- Resting place: Borough Cemetery, Isle of Man; 54.16811°N 4.48005°W
- Education: Girton College, Cambridge
- Occupations: Zoologist; writer; editor; social reformer
- Organization: Vegetarian Society
- Known for: Scientific writing; vegetarianism and women's suffrage advocacy
- Notable work: The Vegetarian Messenger (editor)

Beatrice Lindsay FLS (3 October 1858 – 16 December 1917) was an English zoologist, writer, editor, and social reformer. She studied at Girton College, Cambridge, published "On the Avian Sternum" in 1885, and wrote the zoological books An Introduction to the Study of Zoology (1895) and The Story of Animal Life (1902). She was elected a Fellow of the Linnean Society in 1911.

Lindsay was active in the Vegetarian Society and edited its periodical, The Vegetarian Messenger, becoming the first woman to hold the post. Her vegetarian and zoological writings addressed diet reform, natural history, and the treatment of animals. She opposed painful experiments on animals, wrote for feminist publications, and supported women's suffrage.

== Biography ==
=== Early life and education ===
Beatrice Lindsay was born on 3 October 1858 in Chorlton-on-Medlock, Manchester, to William Lindsay and Anne Lindsay (née Boddington).

Lindsay matriculated at Girton College, Cambridge, in 1880. She studied the Natural Sciences Tripos, receiving a Class II in Part I in 1883 and a Class III in the Moral Sciences Tripos in 1884.

=== Scientific career and writing ===
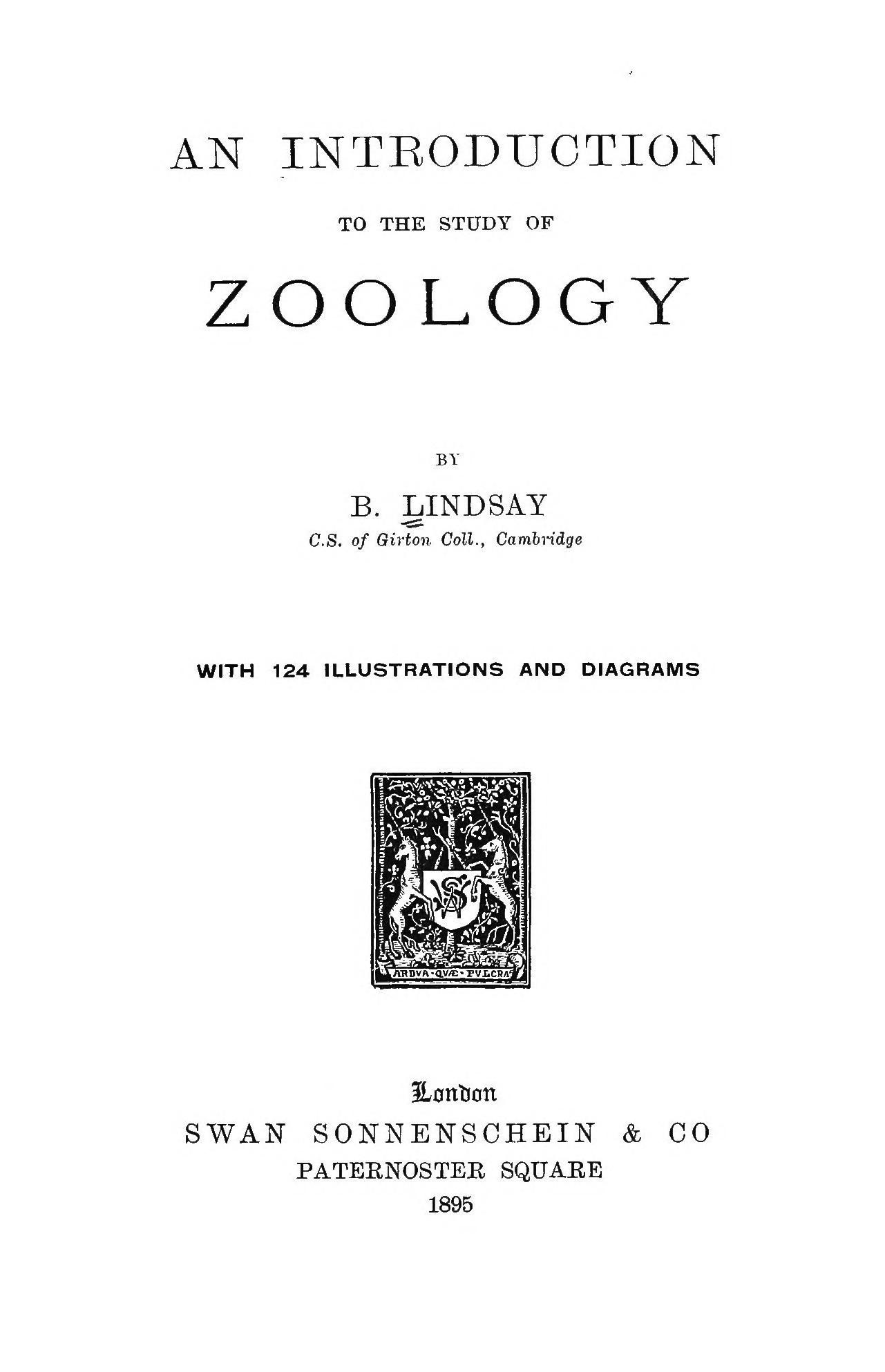
An Introduction to the Study of Zoology (1895)

In 1885, Lindsay published "On the Avian Sternum" in the Proceedings of the Zoological Society of London. The paper argued that the keel of carinate birds was not homologous with reptilian elements.

She later wrote two popular science books: An Introduction to the Study of Zoology (1895), a general guide to zoology, and The Story of Animal Life (1902), part of the Library of Useful Stories series.

In the chapter "Animals as Fellow-Creatures", in An Introduction to the Study of Zoology, Lindsay argued that zoology taught "the fundamental unity of Life" and should produce a sense of kinship with animals. She wrote that animals shared experiences such as pleasure, pain, hunger, warmth, and food with humans, and that some animals showed love, friendship, parental care, and social conduct. Lindsay also criticised hunting in Britain as an anachronistic survival and stated that the naturalist should encourage harmless forms of animal life.

On 21 December 1911, Lindsay was elected a Fellow of the Linnean Society.

=== Views on animal experimentation ===
In 1883, Lindsay wrote to The Zoophilist in response to a leaflet issued by the Victoria Street Society about women students and vivisection at Cambridge. She stated that no student then resident at Girton College had seen an experiment in which chloral was used as an anaesthetic, and argued that the leaflet gave a misleading account of the demonstrations attended by women students. Lindsay wrote that painless experiments on anaesthetised animals could be witnessed without "degradation" by women or men, but described herself as anxious for "the complete prohibition of all painful experiments upon animals". She also stated that the sight of the experiment had not weakened her "sense of the rights of the lower animals".

In An Introduction to the Study of Zoology, Lindsay wrote that animals used for dissection should be treated with reverence, and cited Darwin's fieldwork as a model for studying animals outside laboratories. A review in The Vegetarian Messenger described the book as one of the few elementary zoology works not wholly given over to laboratory study, and stated that Lindsay did not forget "that animals have rights which even zoological students ought not to ignore". The review noted that Lindsay advised students not to destroy life for curiosity, but to use animals already killed for humane reasons, or animals such as rats and mice which, it said, humanitarians accepted could be destroyed. It also described her chapter "Animals as Fellow-Creatures", as a plea for sympathetic treatment of animals.

=== Vegetarianism ===
==== Vegetarian Society and editorship ====
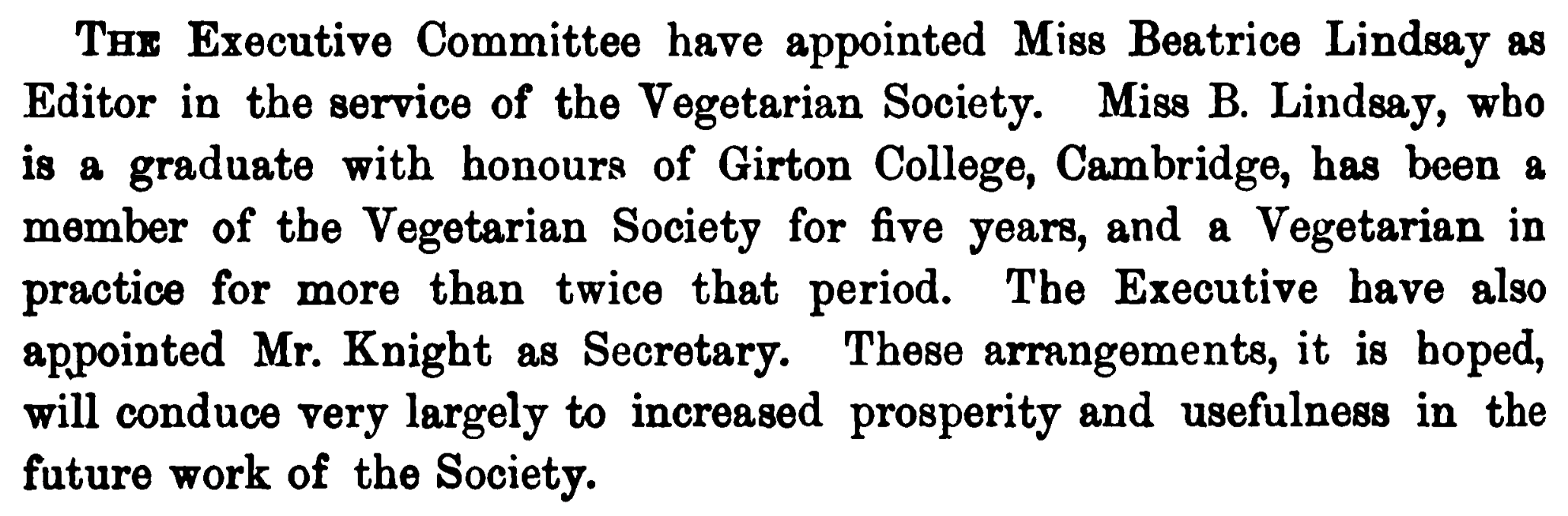
Vegetarian Society notice about Lindsay being appointed as editor, 1885

Lindsay became a vegetarian around 1875 and joined the Vegetarian Society around 1880. In 1885, she was appointed editor of the society's publication, The Vegetarian Messenger, becoming the first woman to hold the post. In a letter to The Cambridge Review later that year, she wrote that vegetarianism should be considered by Cambridge students and described animal slaughter for food as unnecessary, selfish, and cruel. She served as editor until about 1895, when she undertook medical studies in Newcastle-on-Tyne.

During Lindsay's editorship, the periodical introduced a Ladies' Page, a supplementary children's magazine titled The Daisy Basket, and a Christmas annual, Almonds and Raisins, which she also edited. Between 1885 and 1886, she wrote a multi-part history of the vegetarian movement for the periodical. James Gregory describes it as the first history of the modern vegetarian movement.

Lindsay also contributed a recurring column titled New Foods, which introduced readers to imported and less familiar ingredients such as yams, pine nuts, and coconut oil. The column used taxonomy, anatomy, and botany in its explanations of foods and diet.

At the Vegetarian Society's annual meeting in 1885, Lindsay read a paper on the international organisation of vegetarianism. Published in The Dietetic Reformer and Vegetarian Messenger as "The International Aspect of Vegetarianism", it supported the formation of an international vegetarian union and proposed an international vegetarian congress as a preliminary step. She also suggested that the Vegetarian Society revive the use of corresponding members for vegetarians outside Britain.

==== Vegetarian arguments and feminist writing ====
In lectures delivered for the Vegetarian Society and published in 1888, Lindsay presented moral and anatomical arguments for vegetarianism. In "Vegetarianism and Higher Life", she argued for moral kinship between humans and animals. In "Man Not Carnivorous", she interpreted human anatomy as consistent with a frugivorous diet.

Lindsay also contributed to feminist publications such as the Women's Penny Paper. In one letter, she described her adoption of vegetarianism as the outcome of personal experiment, writing: "After several years of experiment, I at last succeeded in making my practice square with my theory." Liam Young argues that Lindsay presented vegetarianism as a practice of self-discipline and transformation.

=== Women's suffrage ===
Lindsay supported women's suffrage and was a member of the National Society for Women's Suffrage. In June 1893, she attended its Conference of the General Committee and Associated Committees.

=== Later work and death ===
In 1886, Lindsay was living in Onchan, Isle of Man, where she described herself as an associate herself as an associate of the Society for Psychical Research in a letter to the spiritualist periodical Light. She later lived in Port St Mary. She died suddenly at Seko Villa, Onchan, on 16 December 1917, aged 59. She was buried at Borough Cemetery on 20 December.

== Publications ==
=== Articles and columns ===
- "Lady Students of Vivisection". The Zoophilist. 2–3: 61–62. 2 April 1883.
- "On the Avian Sternum". Proceedings of the Zoological Society of London. 53 (3). Zoological Society of London: 684–716. May–June 1885. doi:10.1111/j.1469-7998.1885.tb07875.x.
- "Vegetarianism". The Cambridge Review. 7 (162): 134. 9 December 1885.
- "A Vegetarian Letter". Women's Penny Paper (58): 67. 1889.
- "Vegetarianism". Women's Penny Paper (70): 210–211. 1890.
- "The Immoralities of the Cattle Trade". The Vegetarian Messenger. Vegetarian Society: 365. December 1890.
- New Foods (monthly column). The Vegetarian Messenger. Vegetarian Society. 1891.

=== Books and chapters ===
- The Normal Phenomena of Entoptic Vision distinguished from those produced by Mechanical Causes. London: Spottiswoode and Co. 1887.
- Axon, W. E. A., ed. (1888). "Vegetarianism and Higher Life". Manchester Vegetarian Lectures: First Series. Manchester: Vegetarian Society. pp. 42–47.
- Axon, W. E. A., ed. (1888). "Man Not Carnivorous". Manchester Vegetarian Lectures: First Series. Manchester: Vegetarian Society. pp. 69–77.
- An Introduction to the Study of Zoology. London: Swan Sonnenschein & Co. 1895.
- The Story of Animal Life. London: George Newnes. 1902.

=== Editorial work ===
- The Vegetarian Messenger, Vegetarian Society. 1885–c. 1895.
- Almonds and Raisins, Vegetarian Society. c. 1885–1888.

== See also ==
- History of vegetarianism
- Vegetarianism in the United Kingdom
- Vegetarianism in the Victorian era
- Women and animal advocacy
- Women and vegetarianism and veganism advocacy
- Women in science
- Women's suffrage in the United Kingdom
