= Scottish Vegetarian Society =

Defunct Scottish vegetarian organisation

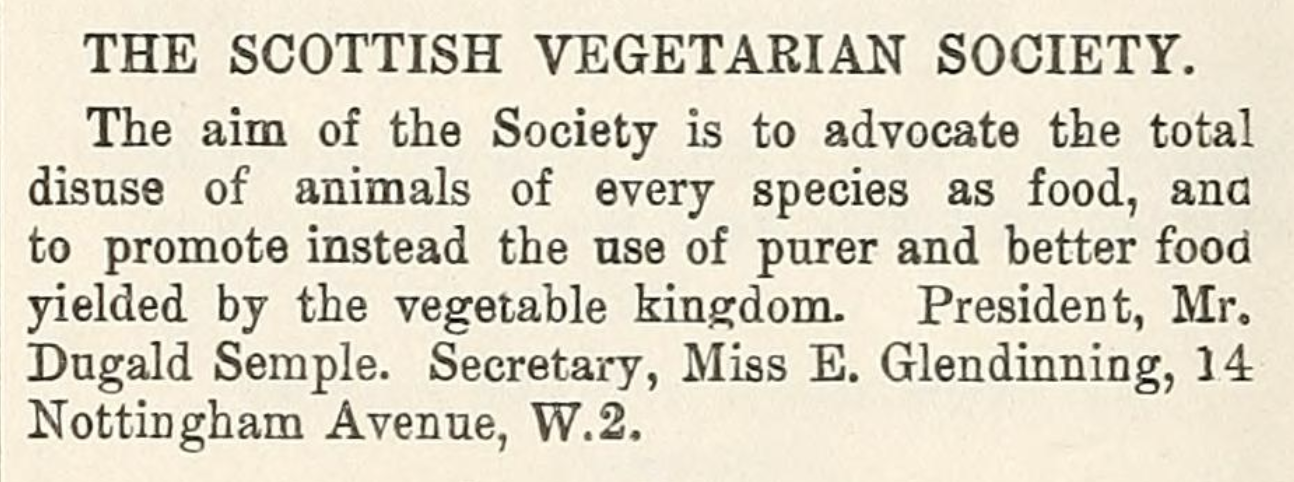
- 1930s advert for the Society
- Abbreviation: SVS
- Successor: Vegetarian Society of the United Kingdom, Glasgow branch
- Formation: 23 November 1892; 133 years ago
- Founder: Joseph Knight
- Dissolved: 1980s
- Headquarters: Athenaeum Building, Buchanan Street, Glasgow; 6 Jamaica Street, Glasgow (from 1897)
- Location: Glasgow, Scotland
- Region served: Scotland
- Members: c. 300 (1933)
- President: H. S. Bathgate (1892–1929); Dugald Semple (1933–)
- Key people: John Barclay (secretary and treasurer)
- Main organ: Health, Food and Cookery (from 1903)
- Affiliations: Vegetarian Federal Union; International Vegetarian Union (supporter, from 1908); Manchester Vegetarian Society (from 1912)

The Scottish Vegetarian Society (SVS) was a vegetarian organisation based in Glasgow, Scotland. Founded in 1892 by Joseph Knight of the Manchester Vegetarian Society, it held social events, lectures and cookery demonstrations, and promoted vegetarianism in Scotland. Its presidents included H. S. Bathgate and Dugald Semple. From 1903, it published the magazine Health, Food and Cookery. In the 1980s, the Society became the Glasgow branch of the Vegetarian Society of the United Kingdom.

== History ==
=== Formation and early years ===
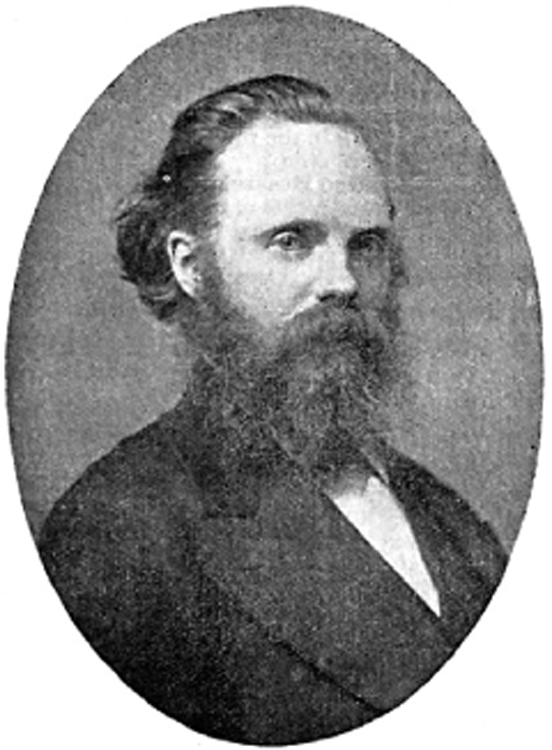
Joseph Knight, founder of the Society, c. 1893

The Scottish Vegetarian Society was formed on 23 November 1892 at the Garden Vegetarian Restaurant in Glasgow, after efforts by Joseph Knight of the Manchester Vegetarian Society.

The Society required all officers to be vegetarians. Its first chairman was H. S. Bathgate, who also served as president until 1929, when he became honorary president.

The Society held its first banquet in 1893 and organised gatherings with meals, music and lectures on vegetarianism.

=== Membership, officers and premises ===
The Society had 19 members in its first year. Membership had risen to 70 by 1896, and had not passed 300 by 1933.

Its first secretary and treasurer was John Barclay, a vegetarian athlete associated with the Vegetarian Cycling and Athletic Club. In 1897, before Barclay's departure for Jamaica, the Society presented him with a travelling trunk at its annual meeting in Glasgow.

In 1898, the committee was divided into social, literary, financial and ladies' committees.

The Society was based in the Athenaeum Building on Buchanan Street, Glasgow. In 1896, addresses associated with the Society included 150 Hope Street and 18 Kew Gardens, Kelvinside. By 1897, its head office was at 6 Jamaica Street, Glasgow.

=== Activities and affiliations ===
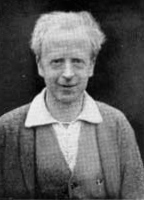
Dugald Semple, president from 1933, c. 1920

By 1897, the Society was affiliated with the Vegetarian Federal Union. It supported the first meeting of the International Vegetarian Union in 1908 and held "At Home" events and cookery lectures in Glasgow.

Dugald Semple was associated with the Society and became its president in 1933. He was an advocate of simple living and lectured on vegetarianism.

By 1912, the Society had affiliated with the Manchester Vegetarian Society, together with local Scottish societies in Edinburgh, Aberdeen and Dundee.

During World War I, Semple promoted meat substitutes during rationing. He also represented Scotland at international vegetarian congresses, where he discussed vegetarianism and peace.

=== Later years ===
The Society remained active after the war through congresses and other work in the vegetarian movement.

In the 1980s, the Society became the Glasgow branch of the Vegetarian Society of the United Kingdom. A later Scottish Vegetarian Association was subsequently formed.

== Publications ==
In 1903, the Society launched the magazine Health, Food and Cookery, edited by Charles A. Hall.

== See also ==
- History of vegetarianism
- Vegetarianism in the Victorian era
- Vegetarianism in the United Kingdom
