= Thomas Owen (vegetarian) =

English bookseller and social reformer (1838–1916)

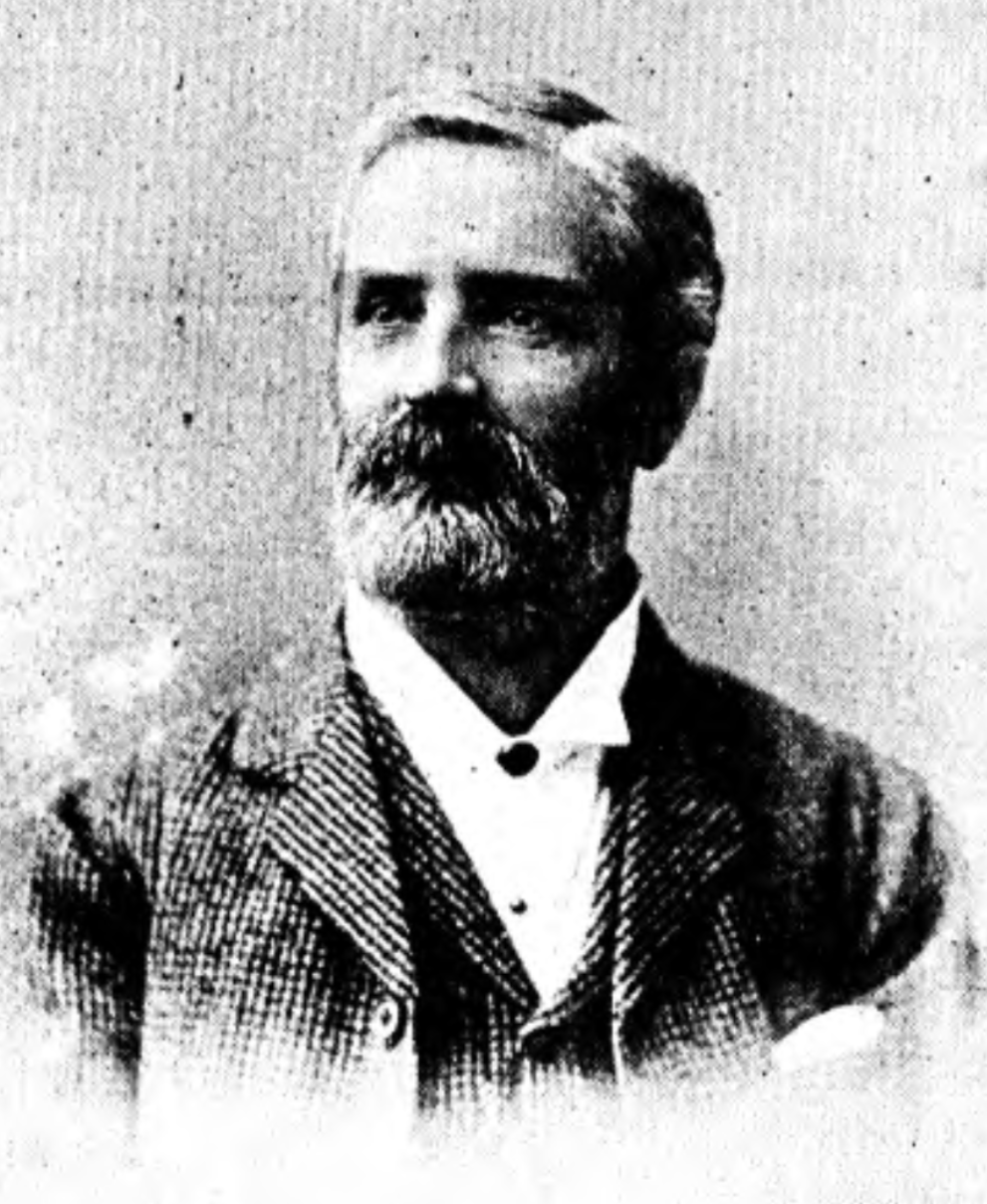
- Owen, c. 1895
- Born: 1838; Oswestry, Shropshire, England
- Died: 26 May 1916 (aged 78); Oswestry, Shropshire, England
- Resting place: Oswestry Cemetery; 52.85353°N 3.04816°W
- Occupations: Bookseller; publisher; writer; social reformer
- Known for: Advocacy for temperance and vegetarianism
- Spouses: Mary Batten (m. 1866; died 1876) Mary Sarah Oliver (m. 1878)
- Children: 8

Thomas Owen (1838 – 26 May 1916) was an English bookseller, publisher, writer, and social reformer. Based in Oswestry, Shropshire, he operated the firm Thomas Owen & Son and published the Oswestry Commercial Circular. He was active in the temperance and vegetarianism movements, served as a vice-president of the Vegetarian Society, and wrote on diet, health, and local history. Owen also promoted a raw food diet, Victorian Turkish baths, and other health practices.

== Biography ==
=== Early life ===
Thomas Owen was born in Oswestry, Shropshire, in the third quarter of 1838. He was the son of Thomas Owen of Sweeney.

=== Career ===
In 1853, Owen was apprenticed to a bookseller-stationer. He later joined the bookselling and printing firm of George Lewis. Owen subsequently bought the firm from Lewis, and the business continued into the 20th century as Thomas Owen & Son.

From 1879, Owen was proprietor of the Oswestry Commercial Circular. He used the publication to promote teetotalism, vegetarianism, sanitary reform, air bathing, skin health, "lung culture", and Victorian Turkish baths. Owen claimed that the paper had 10,000 readers.

=== Vegetarianism and health reform ===
Owen advocated vegetarianism for about 50 years and wrote on the subject. He and his wife were local vegetarian leaders, and Owen served as a vice-president of the Vegetarian Society. He followed a raw food diet consisting of uncooked foods, including nuts and fruit cereals. He was also a teetotaller and non-smoker.

Owen argued that vegetarianism would reduce crime and increase human happiness. In an article reported in The Guardian, he stated that social progress required the abandonment of meat and alcohol. He also wrote that "the food which God commanded our first parents to eat was exactly the same kind as we vegetarians now principally use."

=== Personal life and death ===
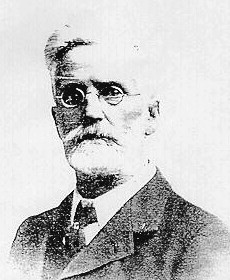
Owen in his later years

Owen married Mary Batten in 1866; the couple had four children. She died in July 1876.

Owen married his second wife, Mary Sarah Oliver (née Corney), on 25 July 1878 at All Saints, Old Swan, Lancashire. She was a widow with one child. They had four children together. Two sons from Owen's second marriage, Herbert and John, were killed in action during the First World War. Mary Sarah Owen contributed to the vegetarian children's magazine The Daisy Basket and in 1893 wrote a tract on vegetarianism, The Best and Most Nutritional Food.

Owen built a Victorian-style Turkish bath in his house after writing to David Urquhart for advice. He later authored a pamphlet on its construction, which included his celebratory stanzas "Verses composed at midnight, in 200° Fahrenheit, February, 1912".

Owen died in Oswestry on 26 May 1916, aged 78. He was buried at Oswestry Cemetery on 29 May.

== Publications ==
- Personal Reminiscences of Oswestry, Fifty Years Ago. Oswestry: T. Owen & Son. 1904. OCLC 771781742.
- Breakfast at Noon! A Clear and Precise Explanation of the Noon-Breakfast System. Oswestry: T. Owen & Son. 1906. OCLC 771781737.
- How to Become Hale, Hearty and Happy. Oswestry: T. Owen & Son. 1906. OCLC 771781740.
- The Use of Heat in the Prevention and Treatment of Disease. Oswestry: T. Owen & Son. 1906. OCLC 562354773.
- How I Came to Build a Turkish Bath: A Personal Narrative. Oswestry: T. Owen & Son. 1910. OCLC 771781739.
- Pessimism: Its Cause and Cure. A Lay Sermonette. Oswestry: T. Owen & Son. 1910. OCLC 774444375.
- The Kettle Cure. Oswestry: T. Owen & Son. 1911. OCLC 774444374.
- The One Infallible Cure for Indigestion: Breakfast at Noon, etc. Oswestry: T. Owen & Son. 1915. OCLC 562354755.
