= R. S. Wilson =

English veterinary surgeon and vegetarian

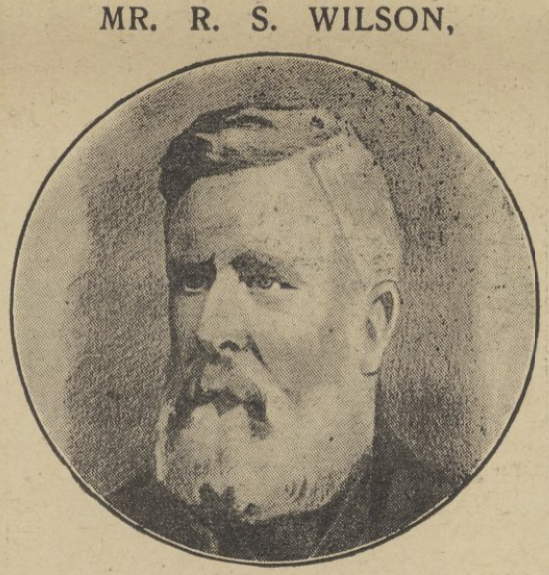
- Born: Robert Stretton Wilson; 24 March 1831; Derby
- Died: 4 February 1904 (aged 72); Tuxford
- Occupation: Veterinary surgeon
- Spouse: Eliza Moody (m. 1854)

Robert Stretton Wilson (24 March 1831 – 4 February 1904) was an English veterinary surgeon, antique collector and activist for vegetarianism. A noted eccentric, Wilson built a miniature model of hell in his grounds at Tuxford Hall.

== Life ==
Wilson was born in 1831 in Derby. He was educated at Edinburgh University, qualified in 1852 as a member of the Royal College of Veterinary Surgeons and practiced in Ollerton. He resided at Ollerton Hall for 20 years and was a churchwarden for a considerable period. He retired in 1873 and moved to Tuxford Hall. He was one of the first members of Tuxford Parish Council.

Soon after he settled at Tuxford Hall; Wilson spent time collecting and studying antiquities. His collection included ancient pottery, oil paintings, carved oak furniture and stone figures including a life-size Benedictine monk. At the entrance of Tuxford Hall was a statue of Saint Peter which was alleged to be the oldest in the world. There was also a stone coffin and statue of the mitred Abbot of York.

Tuxford Hall was described as a well built mansion that was "packed from basement to ceiling with treasures of art, archaeological remains and valuable curios from all corners of the world". The Hall featured many valuables such as Lord Nelson's sword, the hat worn by Wellington on the field of Waterloo and Lord Byron's bed and table from Newstead. Wilson's bedroom contained oak figures and a portrait of John Hitchinson. He also had a bedroom that featured King John's four-poster bed from Newark Castle and a wax figure of Barry O'Meara, physician to the Napoleon.

In the grounds, Wilson had built a small chapel where he delivered lessons and readings every Sunday throughout the year. The chapel contained photographs of Lord Salisbury, Sir Alfred Milner and other politicians. The Hall was always open for visitors.

== Vegetarianism ==
Wilson became a vegetarian in 1881. From 1889 to 1895 he attended Vegetarian Society meetings and in 1899 operated a vegetarian shop at Tuxford Hall for local tourists.

== Miniature hell ==
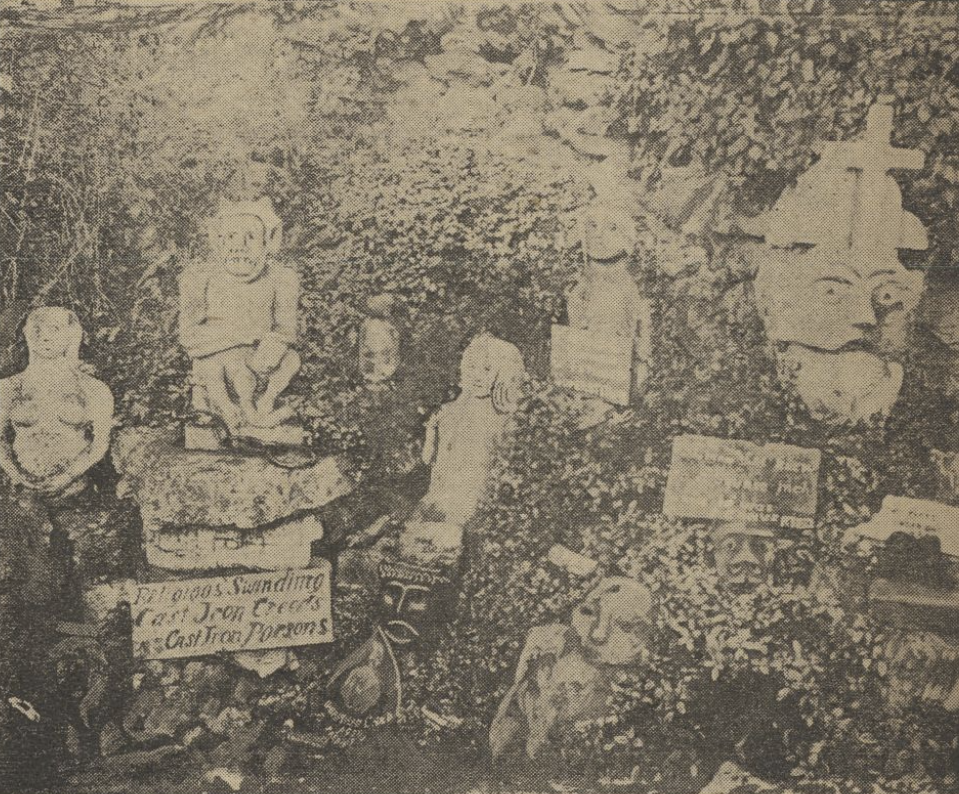
The miniature hell at Tuxford Hall

Wilson disagreed with orthodox ideas of eternal punishment, believing punishment was temporal. He questioned, "how is it possible to believe that a merciful God would keep his creatures in fire and brimstone".

In his grounds at Tuxford Hall, Wilson built a miniature model of hell. At the entrance was a large figure of Satan, heavily chained and holding a skull in his hands. The hell consisted of a pit of small figures whom Wilson considered to represent evil such as drunkards, hypocrites and liars. The figures included "The Chattering Charwoman", "The Woman with a Proud Look and Lying Tongue", "The President of the Primrose League", "Priestcraft", "The Person with a Hard Heart", "The Tobacco Devil", "A Curate Sent to Hell for Disobeying his Bishop", "A Religious Lawyer" and others of a similar character. There was also a bottled newspaper as it did not agree with Wilson's political views. In 1903, a bust of Paul Kruger was added to the pit.

In December 1904, the stone figures were sold in auction for 50 shillings. The "Devil in Chains" was knocked down and sold for 30 shillings. After the auction, local villagers were alleged to have commented, "Hooray! We've got hell away from Tuxford at last".

== Personal life ==
Wilson was a strict teetotaller and non-smoker. He married Eliza Moody at St Werburgh's Church, Derby in 1854. Eliza died at Tuxford Hall in 1882, aged 49.

Wilson died of heart failure in February 1904. He was buried at Ollerton Cemetery.
