= Peter Foxcroft =

English vegetarianism activist (1819–1896)

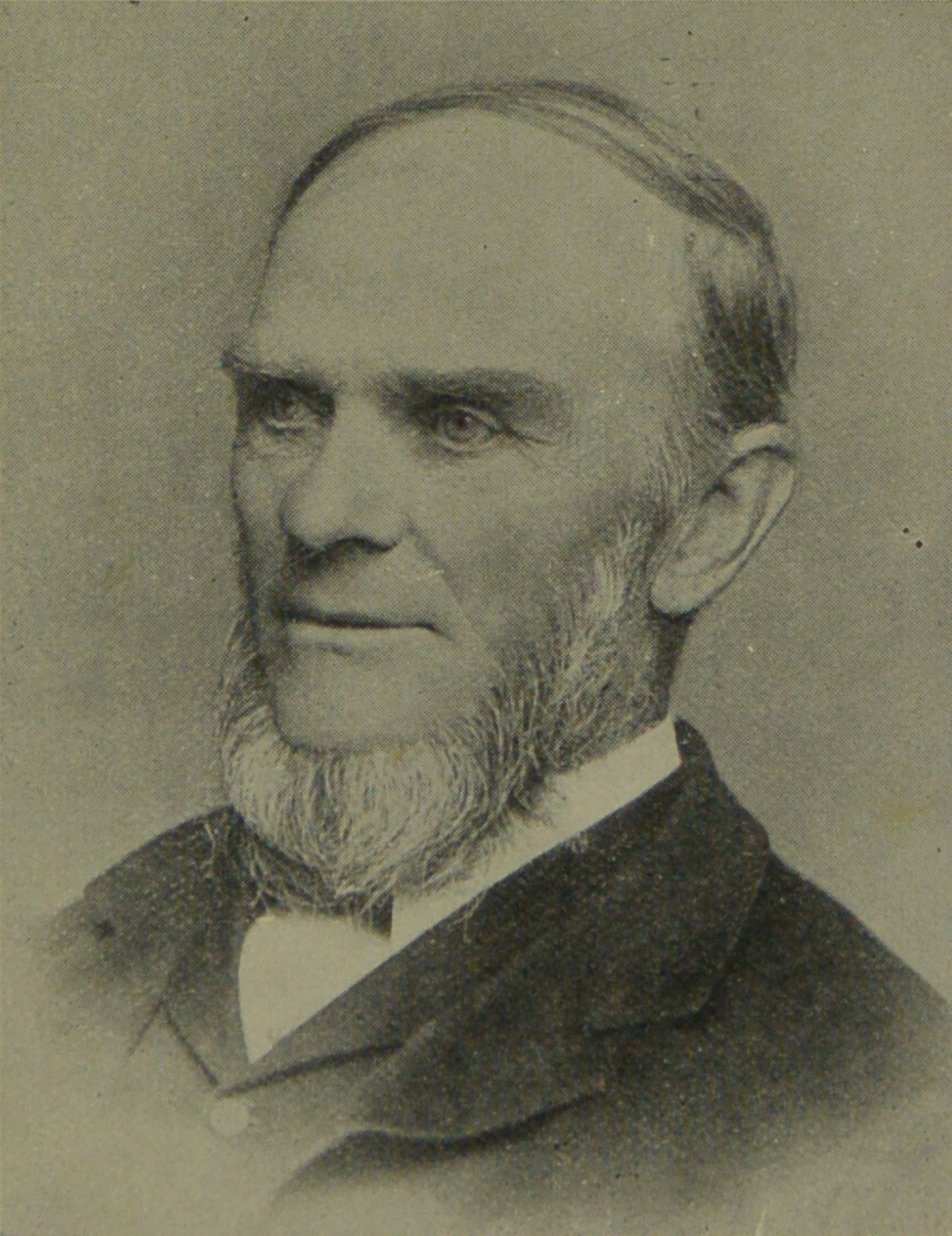
- Foxcroft in Fifty Years of Food Reform (1898)
- Born: 1819; Gargrave, Yorkshire, England
- Died: 3 April 1896 (aged 77); Glazebrook, Lancashire, England
- Occupations: Vegetarianism activist; Cotton mill manager; inventor; Bible Christian Church preacher
- Organization: Vegetarian Society
- Spouses: Esther Horrocks (m. 1848; died 1876) Jane Dickinson (m. 1883)

Peter Foxcroft (1819 – 3 April 1896) was an English vegetarianism activist, cotton mill manager, inventor, and Bible Christian Church preacher. He was an early member of the Vegetarian Society, serving as its secretary, local secretary in Salford, vice-president, and chair of its executive. Foxcroft managed a cotton mill owned by Charles and John Tysoe and filed patents for improvements in cotton machinery.

== Biography ==
=== Early life and career ===
Peter Foxcroft was born in 1819 in Gargrave, Yorkshire, the son of Thomas Foxcroft, a grocer. Charles W. Forward later wrote that Foxcroft came from a modest background and acquired a small fortune twice through work and economy.

Foxcroft worked for much of his life in a cotton mill, where workrooms were heated to between 80 and 100 °F (27 and 38 °C). Forward wrote that Foxcroft worked at one mill for 26 years without losing a day through illness, and that he outlived his parents and siblings. After adopting a vegetarian diet, Foxcroft reported an improvement in his health. He later returned briefly to his former diet, after which he said his earlier health problems returned, and then resumed vegetarianism permanently. He was also a teetotaller.

In 1847, Foxcroft joined the Vegetarian Society. He succeeded Henry S. Clubb as the society's secretary in 1850 and became its local secretary in Salford around 1852, remaining in the post for about two decades. He also served as a vice-president of the society and chaired its executive for the same period. Foxcroft criticised Francis William Newman for permitting associate membership in the society for people who wished to be members but were not fully vegetarian.

In 1848, Foxcroft became a Bible Christian and later served as a lay preacher. In the same year, he married Esther Horrocks at St Mary's Church, Manchester. At the time of their marriage, Foxcroft was a 30-year-old bookkeeper living in Berkley Street, Manchester, while Horrocks was aged 35 and was the daughter of George Horrocks, a dyer. In 1851, Foxcroft and his wife stayed at the home of James Simpson, a fellow member of the Bible Christian Church, at Fox Hill Bank, Oswaldtwistle, Lancashire. Foxcroft officiated at Christ Church in Salford from 1853 to 1855.

Foxcroft later managed a cotton mill owned by Charles and John Tysoe, which had previously belonged to Joseph Brotherton. In 1853, he filed a patent for improvements in machinery for doubling cotton and other fibrous materials. In 1856, Foxcroft, John Tysoe, and Charles Tysoe were granted a patent for improvements in machinery for roving, spinning, and doubling cotton and other fibrous substances. In 1857, Foxcroft and the machinist William Crighton were granted a patent for improvements in machinery for processing cotton wool or other fibrous materials.

Foxcroft supported the Liberal Party and served on committees for national and local Liberal candidates.

In 1870, a 13-year-old girl died at the cotton mill where Foxcroft worked. A factory inspector attempted to prosecute a spinning mule minder, and Foxcroft gave evidence. The magistrate dismissed the case, stating that factory masters were responsible for preventing such accidents.

=== Later life and death ===
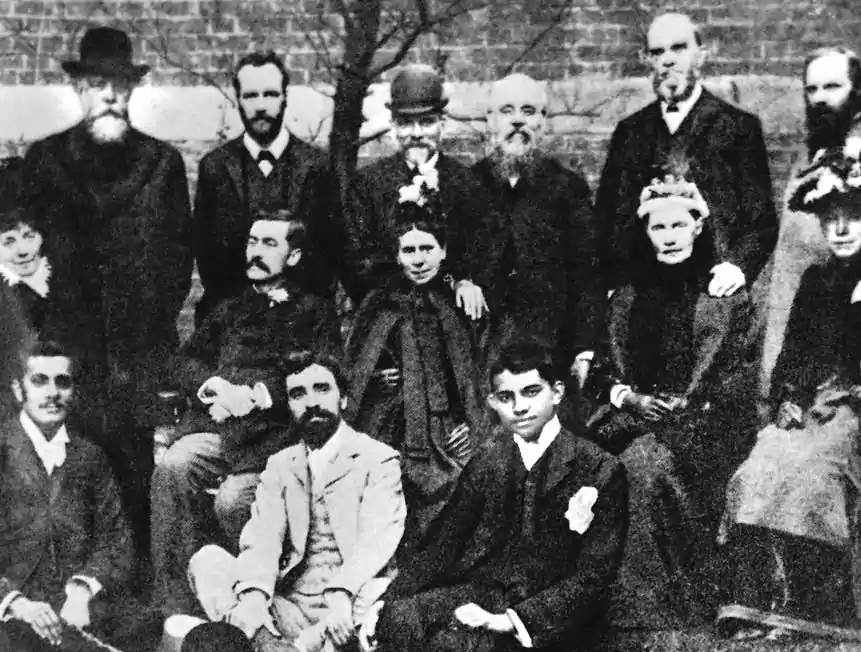
1891 London Vegetarian Society meeting; Foxcroft is back row, second from right, with his second wife seated in front

After the death of his first wife on 26 October 1876, Foxcroft continued to live in Salford, where he retired. On 4 January 1883, he married Jane Dickinson (born 1832), the daughter of Henry Dickinson, at Christ Church, Heaton Norris, Manchester. His second wife was a vegetarian from birth. They later moved to Glazebrook, Lancashire.

In retirement, Foxcroft lectured on vegetarianism across the United Kingdom. His appearances included lectures at the Temperance Hall in Pollitt Street, Guernsey; the Literary and Philosophical Society Hall in Newcastle; the Torquay YWCA; and the YMCA at Mount Pleasant. At Guernsey, he stated that he had not consumed meat, fish, or fowl for 31 years and credited vegetarianism with relieving his indigestion and avoiding medical expenses. He also served as director of a vegetarian restaurant operated by Frederick Harrison, opened in 1884, which functioned more like a club.

Around a year before his death, Foxcroft donated £100 (equivalent to £11,368 in 2025) to the Vegetarian Society. Forward wrote that this was a large amount for Foxcroft, as he was not wealthy. He died in Glazebrook on 3 April 1896, aged 77, and was buried with his first wife, Esther, at Weaste Cemetery. Rev. James Clark delivered his funeral sermon.

After Foxcroft's death, a memorial window was installed in the Bible Christian Church in Cross Lane, Salford, in recognition of his work for the church and the Vegetarian Society.

== See also ==
- Christian vegetarianism
- History of vegetarianism
- Vegetarianism in the Victorian era
- Vegetarianism in the United Kingdom
- Temperance movement in the United Kingdom
