= The Daisy Basket =

British children's vegetarian magazine (1893–1894)

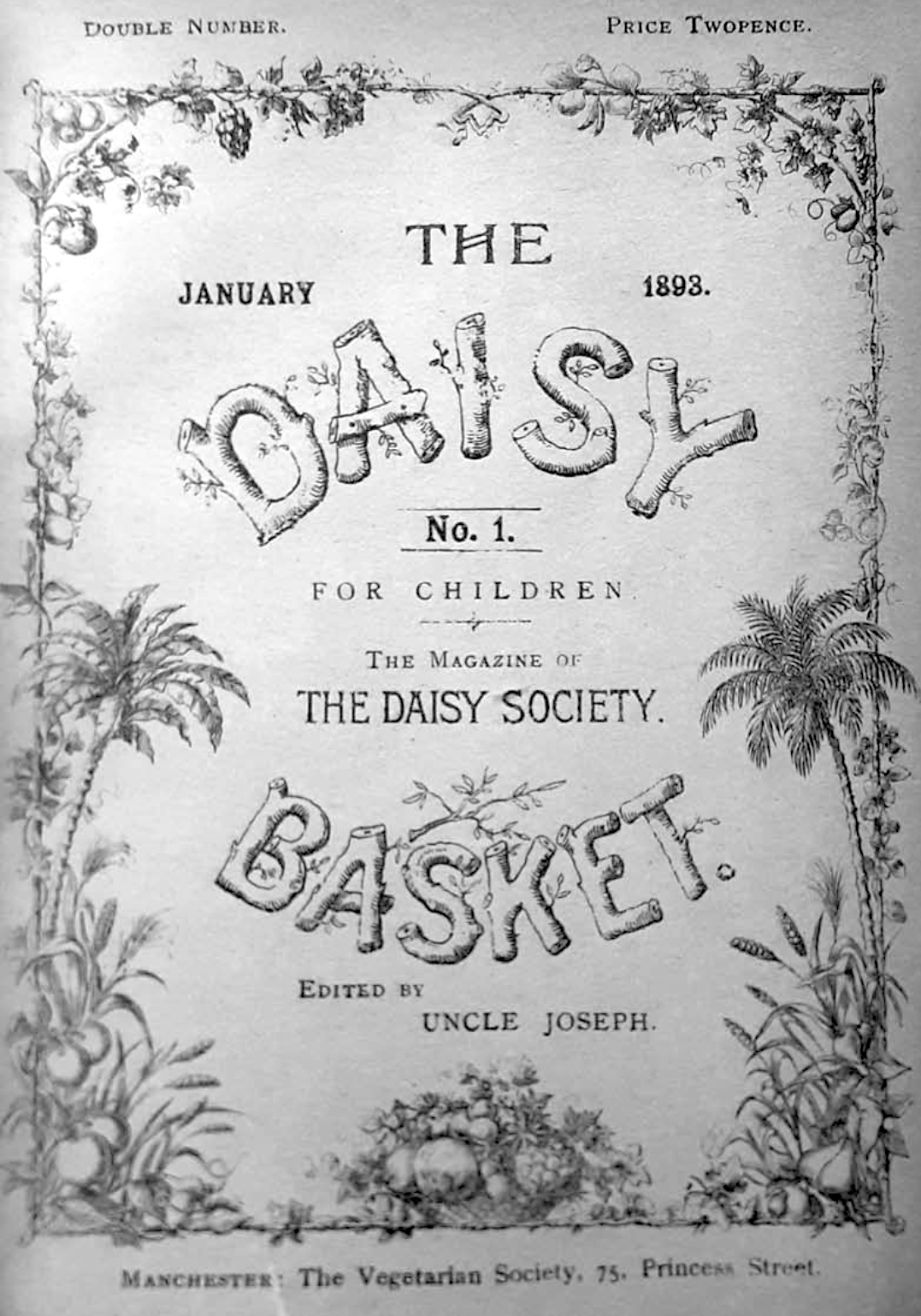
- Cover of the first issue, January 1893
- Editor: Joseph Knight
- Categories: Children's literature, Vegetarianism
- Frequency: Quarterly
- Publisher: Vegetarian Society
- First issue: January 1893; 133 years ago
- Final issue: October 1894; 132 years ago
- Country: United Kingdom of Great Britain and Ireland
- Based in: Manchester
- Language: English
- OCLC: 877750239

The Daisy Basket was a British quarterly children's magazine published by the Vegetarian Society in Manchester from January 1893 to October 1894. Edited by Joseph Knight, who wrote as "Uncle Joseph", it was intended for members of the Daisy Society, the children's branch of the Vegetarian Society, and other young readers. It was the first regularly published British vegetarian children's periodical. Its contents included stories, poetry, letters, competitions and articles promoting vegetarianism and animal welfare.

== Background and publication ==
The Daisy Society was established by the Vegetarian Society in 1883 for vegetarians under the age of 14. Its name was proposed by W. M. Wright in 1884 and formally adopted in 1885. The society sought to encourage children to practise vegetarianism and understand its principles.

The Vegetarian Society had previously issued Daisy Leaves, a children's publication that appeared only occasionally. In January 1893, Beatrice Lindsay, editor of The Dietetic Reformer and Vegetarian Messenger, helped launch The Daisy Basket as a supplementary quarterly magazine for children. The first issue was a double number priced at twopence, while subsequent issues cost one penny.

Knight, who became secretary of the Vegetarian Society in Manchester in 1884, edited the magazine as "Uncle Joseph". He addressed readers directly, offering advice and encouraging their participation in the vegetarian movement. The magazine was published from the society's offices, which moved from 75 Princess Street to 9 Peter Street during its run.

A reader proposed increasing the magazine's frequency to monthly, but the editors explained that this would require more subscribers. In January 1894, they announced that it would continue to appear quarterly. Financial support subsequently came from a bequest to the Vegetarian Society by Matilda Cooper of Hastings, whose concern for animal suffering was acknowledged in the magazine. The bequest funded three issues, but the magazine attracted fewer readers than expected. It ceased publication in October 1894 after eight quarterly issues. In the final issue, the editors announced that it would continue in "another form".

The next regularly published British vegetarian children's magazine was The Children's Garden (1900–1905). John Edmundson identifies Daisy Leaves and The Daisy Basket as predecessors of The Children's Realm (1906–1914).

== Contents ==
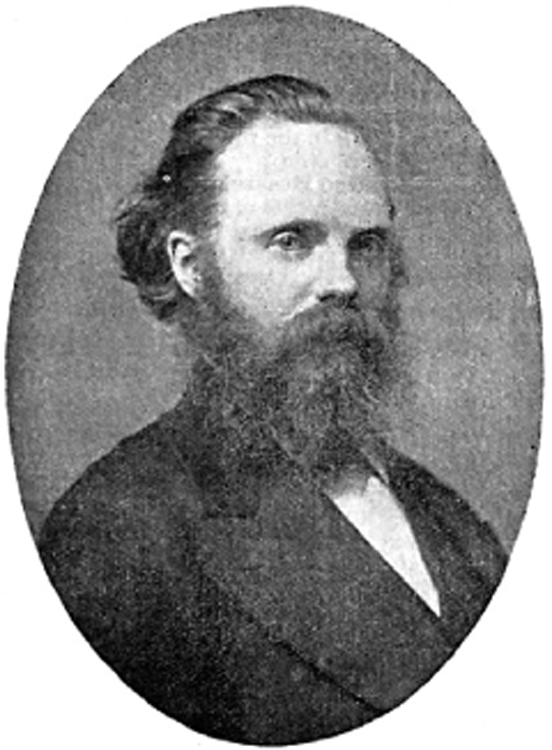
Joseph Knight, editor of The Daisy Basket, c. 1893

The opening editorial stated that the magazine was intended to advance "the Vegetarian cause" by encouraging readers to abstain from meat for their own benefit and that of animals. It addressed both Daisy Society members and other children, inviting those who were not members to join the society.

The magazine published editorials, poetry, short stories, lectures, letters, book notices and writing competitions. Regular features included "Chatty Corner" and "Jottings". Its original fiction included "Francis' Rabbit" by Joseph Knight, "The Cat's Cradle" by Edmund J. Ballie and "The GVR" by Mary S. Owen. It also reprinted material from The Young Abstainer, The Humanitarian and Sunbeam, as well as writings by Edward Byron Nicholson, Benjamin Ward Richardson and Edith Carrington.

Readers were encouraged to contribute letters and essays about their experiences of vegetarianism. In "Chatty Corner", Knight responded to correspondence from children, including a girl named Ethel who reported knowing no other vegetarians in her neighbourhood. Some writing competitions were restricted to Daisy Society members, encouraging non-members to join in order to participate.

Animal welfare was a recurring subject. The magazine opposed the killing of animals for food and criticised practices such as collecting insects and butterflies, taking birds' eggs, trapping birds and using feathers to decorate women's hats. It presented kindness towards animals as part of vegetarian conduct and connected dietary choices with religious and moral obligations.

Christian arguments for vegetarianism appeared throughout the magazine. The first issue maintained that the "spirit of the Bible", together with scientific evidence, supported a vegetarian diet. In one address, Thomas Owen, a vice-president of the Vegetarian Society, argued that the food provided to Adam and Eve in the Book of Genesis resembled the diet followed by vegetarians. His wife, Mary Sarah Owen, also contributed to the magazine. Religious themes also appeared in children's contributions. A writing competition invited readers to interpret passages from the Bible, while other contributions connected vegetarianism with the diet of Adam and Eve.

The magazine occasionally addressed other social reform movements. Reviews and notices mentioned women's position in society and a women's club in Washington, D.C. Its "Jottings" section reproduced an account from Fraternity describing Black and white pupils attending the same school in Brooklyn, including Black teachers who taught white children. Kubisz notes that questions of gender and racial equality received relatively little attention compared with vegetarianism and animal welfare.

== Scholarly analysis ==
In her 2023 study of The Daisy Basket, Marzena Kubisz examines the magazine as part of the late Victorian vegetarian movement's efforts to reach children. She argues that it provided young vegetarians with opportunities to participate in a community through reading, correspondence and competitions, while encouraging them to develop a vegetarian identity. She also discusses the magazine's role in helping children respond to criticism of their dietary choices and communicate with other vegetarians when they were socially isolated.

Drawing on Michel Foucault's concepts of "technologies of the self", "subjection" and "subjectivation", Kubisz examines how the magazine sought to shape children's vegetarian identities. She argues that its moral instruction and participatory activities both encouraged children to adopt standards established by adult reformers and provided opportunities for them to develop and express their own understanding of vegetarianism.

== See also ==
- Bibliography of veganism and vegetarianism
- History of vegetarianism
- Vegetarianism in the Victorian era
- Vegetarianism in the United Kingdom
- Animal welfare in the United Kingdom
