= William E. A. Axon =

English librarian, antiquary, and journalist (1846–1913)

William E. A. Axon FRSL
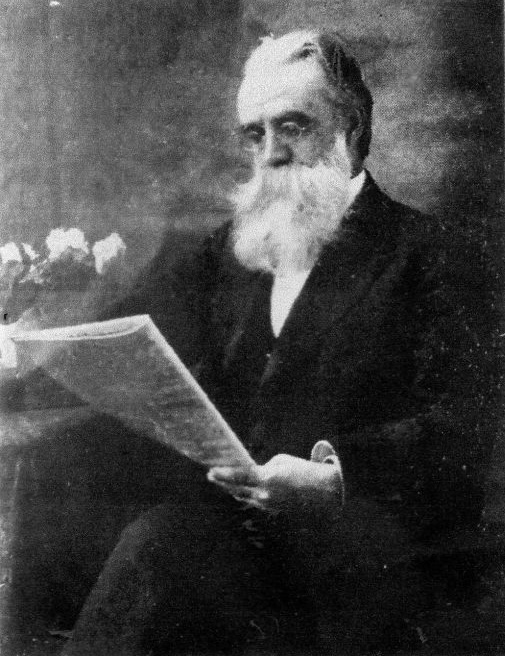
- Axon in 1901
- Born: William Edward Armytage Axon; 13 January 1846; Chorlton-on-Medlock, Manchester, England
- Died: 27 December 1913 (aged 67); Manchester, England
- Resting place: St Paul's, Kersal; 53.51488°N 2.27255°W
- Occupations: Librarian; antiquary; journalist; bibliographer; activist
- Employer: Manchester Guardian
- Spouses: Jane Woods (m. 1866; died 1889) Setta Luft (m. 1892; died 1910)
- Children: 4, including Katherine

William Edward Armytage Axon FRSL (13 January 1846 – 27 December 1913) was an English librarian, antiquary, journalist, bibliographer, and vegetarianism activist. He worked on the literary staff of the Manchester Guardian for about 30 years and contributed to the Dictionary of National Biography under the initials W. E. A. A. Axon wrote on the history, literature, dialect, folklore, and antiquities of Lancashire and Cheshire, and served as president of the Lancashire and Cheshire Antiquarian Society. He was also active in the Vegetarian Society, serving as vice-president, honorary secretary, treasurer, editor of the Vegetarian Messenger, and president from 1911 until his death.

== Biography ==
=== Early life ===
Axon was born in Chorlton-on-Medlock, Manchester, on 13 January 1846. He was the illegitimate child of Edward Armytage, a clothing manufacturer, and Lydia Whitehead, a 15-year-old servant in Armytage's household. He was later adopted by the Axon family and took their surname. His adoptive family had financial difficulties, and ill health prevented him from attending regular school. He learned to read through his adoptive sisters and a Baptist Sunday school in Hulme.

=== Career ===
Axon began work as a boy at the Manchester Reference Library and was later associated with literary and antiquarian circles in the city. He served as honorary secretary of the Manchester and Salford Sunday Society, which campaigned for the opening of Manchester libraries on Sundays. He wrote on the folklore, dialect, and local history of Lancashire and Cheshire, and later served as president of the Lancashire and Cheshire Antiquarian Society. As a member of the English Dialect Society, he wrote tales and sketches concerned with Lancashire dialect and customs.

In 1907, Axon published Cobden as a Citizen, a study of Richard Cobden. In 1908, he published a study of Anna Jane Vardill and her poem written as a sequel to Samuel Taylor Coleridge's Christabel. He presented evidence to the Royal Society of Literature supporting Vardill's authorship of the poem.

Axon worked for about 30 years on the literary staff of the Manchester Guardian. In 1913, the University of Manchester awarded him an honorary Master of Arts degree. He was a Fellow of the Royal Society of Literature and an honorary LL.D. of Wilberforce University. He contributed to the Encyclopædia Britannica, Dictionary of National Biography, American Encyclopædia, and Notes and Queries.

=== Vegetarianism ===
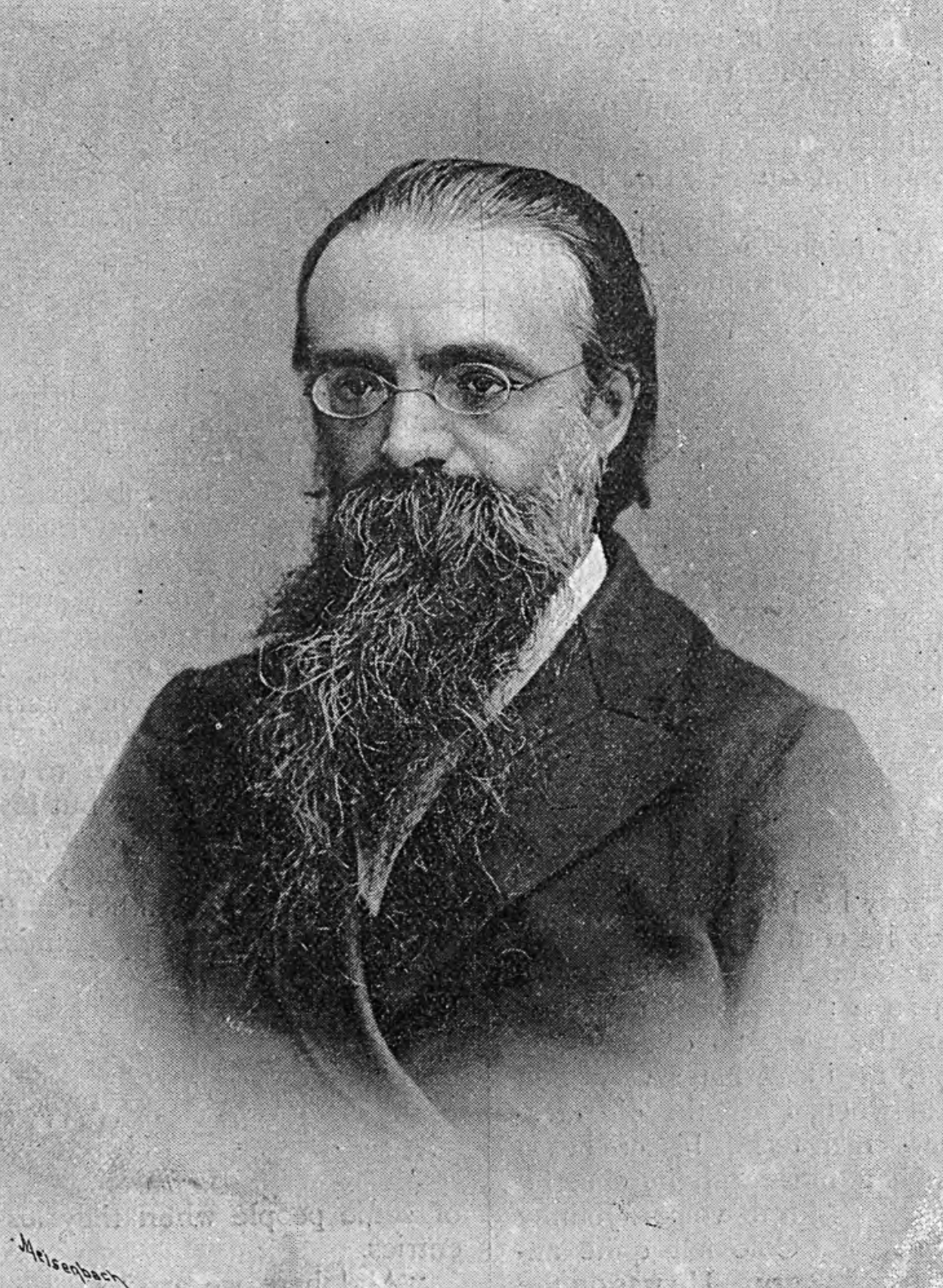
Axon, c. 1889

Axon was a vegetarian and a member of the Anti-Tobacco League. Chien-hui Li has described him as a "leading figure of the vegetarian movement". He served as vice-president and honorary secretary of the Vegetarian Society, as well as treasurer. He was president of the society from 1911 until his death in 1913. (Note: Calvert states that he served until 1914. However, Axon died the previous year.)

Axon contributed articles on the history of vegetarianism to John Harvey Kellogg's Good Health. He also edited The Vegetarian Messenger.

Axon wrote the preface to the 1884 edition of Percy Bysshe Shelley's A Vindication of Natural Diet. In 1891, he published Shelley's Vegetarianism.

Historian Ina Zweiniger-Bargielowska notes that Axon opposed cruelty to animals and objected to the work of the slaughterman.

Axon served on the provisional committee of the Humanitarian League. In 1912, the League's Manchester branch was formed with his support.

=== Folklore ===
Axon wrote on Lancashire folklore, dialect, vernacular song, and comparative folklore. According to Lucy M. Evans, he began contributing dialect and folklore material to Notes and Queries in 1868, later writing on philology, international folklore, and Romani language and lore. In 1905, he gave a Manchester lecture on Lancashire folklore that discussed local beliefs in a comparative framework and criticised witch persecutions and the survival of superstition. Evans describes him as a transitional figure between earlier collectors and the more systematic folklorists of the later nineteenth century. He joined the Folklore Society in 1878 and the Gypsy Lore Society in 1888, the year of its foundation.

=== Personal life and death ===
Axon married Jane Woods (1843–1889) in 1866; they had three children. He married Setta Luft (1870–1910) in 1892; they had one child.

Axon was a teetotaller and a member of the Bible Christian Church. He was elected to the Manchester Literary and Philosophical Society on 3 November 1874.

Axon died at home on 27 December 1913 and was buried at St Paul's, Kersal, Manchester.

== Bibliography ==
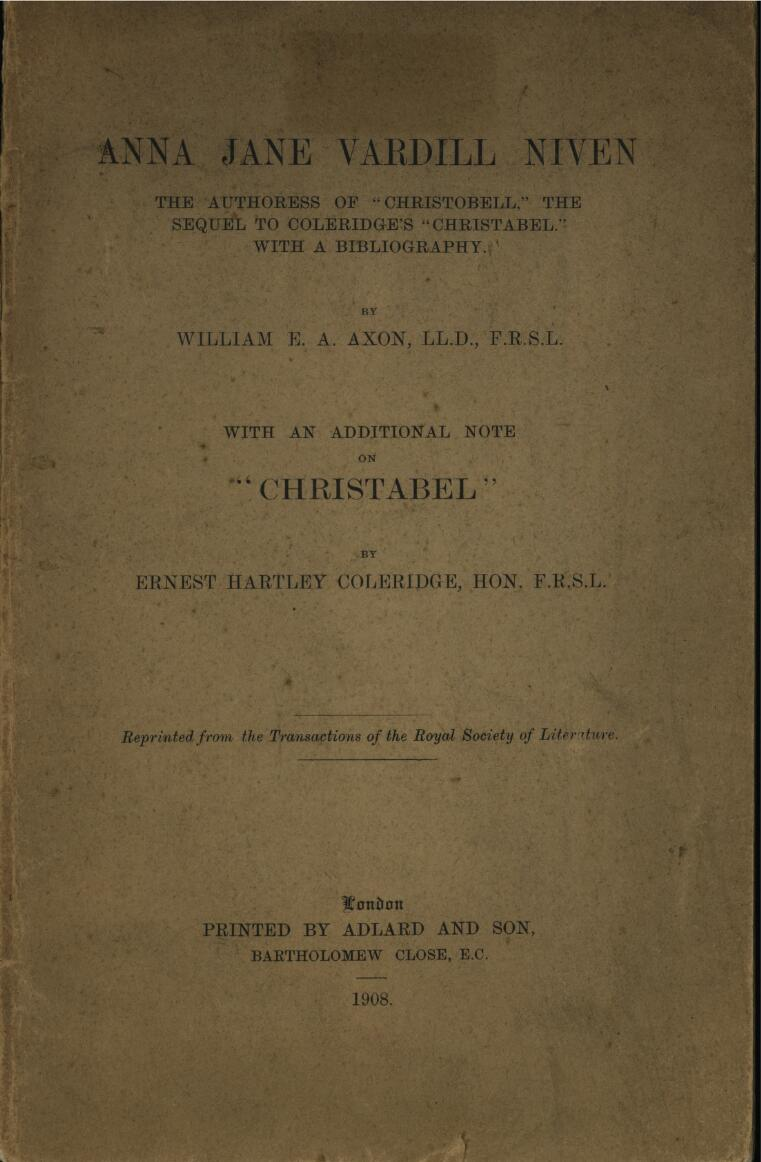
Anna Jane Vardill Niven frontispiece by Axon

- 1877: Handbook of the Public Libraries of Manchester and Salford. Manchester: Abel Heywood and Son.
- 1879: John Ruskin: A Bibliographical Biography.
- 1883: Lancashire Gleanings.
- 1884: Cheshire Gleanings.
- 1888: Stray Chapters in Literature, Folk-lore, and Archaeology.
- 1890: Thomas Taylor, the Platonist.
- 1891: Shelley's Vegetarianism.
- 1893: The Literature of Vegetarianism.
- 1897: Bygone Sussex.
- 1899: Echoes of Old Lancashire.
- 1899: Ortensio Lando, a humorist of the Renaissance on Ortensio Lando
- 1907: Cobden as a Citizen
- 1908: Anna Jane Vardill Niven

=== Edited works ===
- 1886: The Annals of Manchester: a chronological record from the earliest times to the end of 1885. Manchester: J. Heywood, Deansgate and Ridgefield ("The volume now offered to the public, as a revised edition of the Manchester Historical Recorder, is virtually a new work ..." - preface); electronic version
- Collected sermons, 1631–1659 of Thomas Fuller, Volume 1 edited by John Eglington Bailey. Completed by William E. A. Axon (1891)
- Collected sermons, 1631–1659 Volume 2 edited by John Eglington Bailey. Completed by William E. A. Axon (1891)

=== Biography ===
Lucy M. Evans, Axoniana: William Edward Armytage Axon 1846-1913 and the Communities of Print (U.K.: Book Empire, 2025) ISBN 9781914584664

=== Contributions to the DNB ===
- Ashworth, John
- Banks, George Linnaeus
- Bellot, Thomas
- Bennis, George Geary
- Blythe, John Dean
- Bowers, George Hull
- Bradberry, David
- Brandwood, James
- Brittain, Thomas
- Brooke, Henry
- Brookes, Joshua
- Brotherton, Edward
- Bruen, John
- Butterworth, James
- Calvert, Charles
- Calvert, Thomas
- Canne, John
- Castillo, John
- Caw, John Young
- Clayton, John (1754–1843)
- Cole, Thomas (1628–1697)
- Crestadoro, Andrea

== See also ==
- Christian vegetarianism
- History of vegetarianism
- Vegetarianism in the Victorian era
- Vegetarianism in the United Kingdom

== Notes ==
Professional and academic associations
Preceded by Ernest Frederick Letts	President of the Lancashire and Cheshire Antiquarian Society; 1903–04	Succeeded by Henry Taylor
