= Dugald Semple =

Scottish advocate and writer (1884–1964)

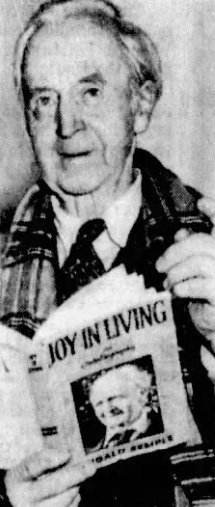
- Semple in 1959
- Born: Dugald Patterson McDougall Semple; 7 February 1884; Johnstone, Scotland
- Died: 19 January 1964 (aged 79); Fairlie, North Ayrshire, Scotland
- Resting place: Lochwinnoch Cemetery, Lochwinnoch, Renfrewshire, Scotland; 55.80250°N 4.63722°W
- Occupations: Advocate; writer
- Spouse: Catherine Amos Graham (m. 1916; died 1941)

Dugald Patterson McDougall Semple (7 February 1884 – 19 January 1964) was a Scottish advocate of simple living and animal welfare, naturalist, prolific author, and fruitarian. He is sometimes credited with co-founding the vegan movement in 1944 (with Dorothy and Donald Watson and other friends) without using the term "vegan".

== Biography ==
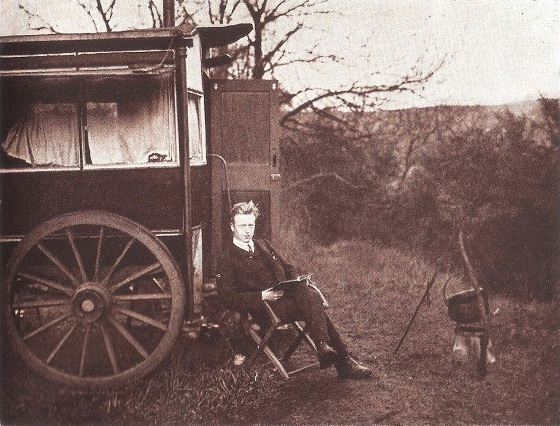
Semple relaxing at the door of his "Wheelhouse", at Linwood Moss, in 1907

Semple's mother hailed from a farm near Beith, and his father worked as a tailor. He was born in Johnstone near Paisley, Scotland. Dugald won a bursary to Paisley Grammar School and served an apprenticeship as an engineering draughtsman. In 1907, he moved into a tent, and later an old omnibus located on Linwood Moss. In 1916, he was a conscientious objector and thus exempted from military service on condition that he continued lecturing on food economy. He married Catherine Amos Graham in 1916.

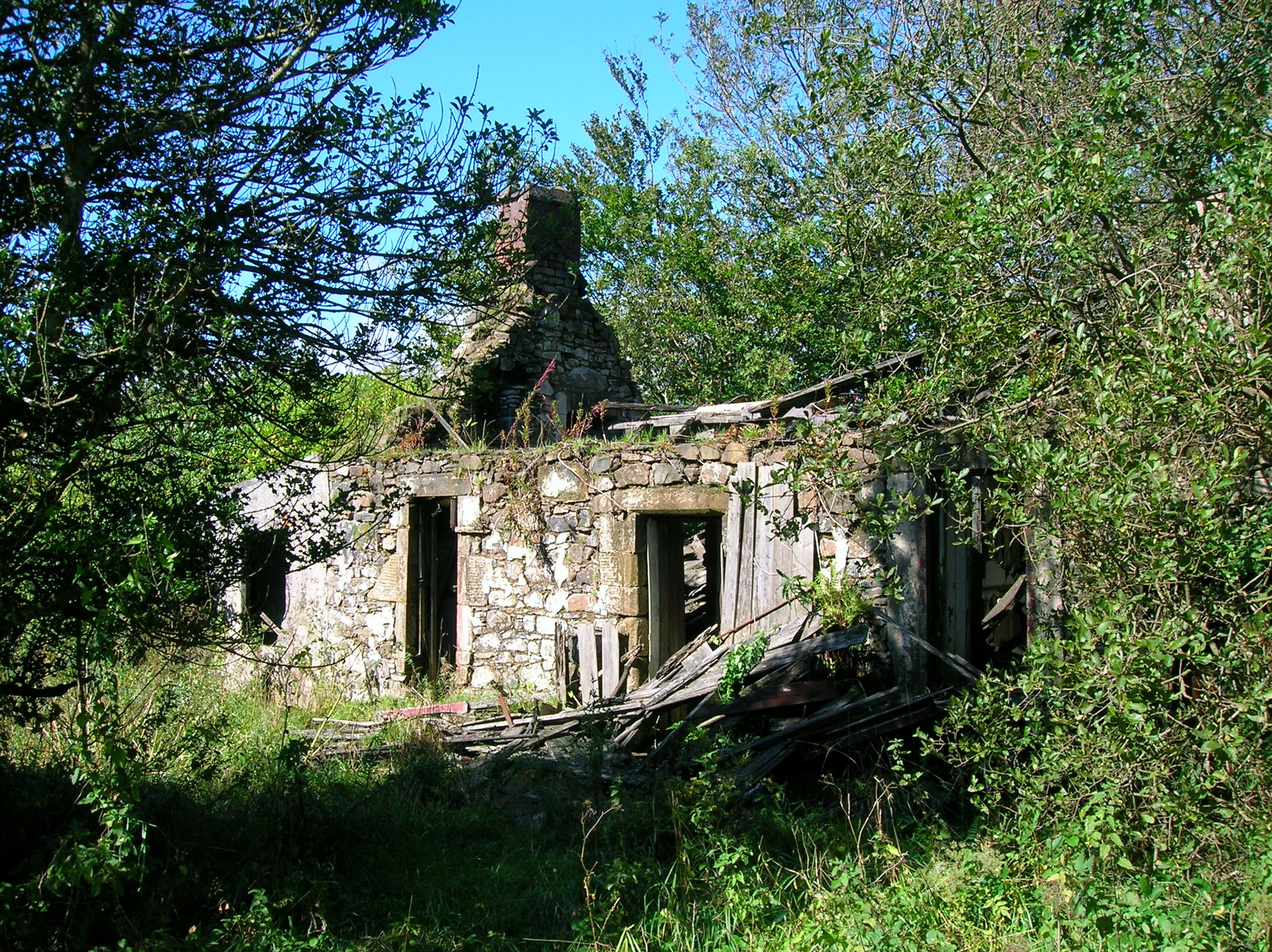
Davie's o'the Mill ruins in 2011.

Dugald Semple, vegan and "Scottish Apostle of the simple life," farmed at Davie's o'the Mill near Beith in North Ayrshire from the 1930s until around 1950, when it was a smallholding. Dugald was a hippy before hippies officially existed and started living in an army tent from 1907. He was sometimes known as the 'Hut Man' from living in his 'hut on wheels' or caravan and therefore probably did not live in the house. He later lived in Fairlie, North Ayrshire. Semple preached self-responsibility and care for others. Curiously for a vegetarian he appears in a photograph of Davie's o'the Mill to be keeping chickens. He regularly appeared on radio programmes, including Out with Romany and Hutman of the BBC. During 1916–1917, he lived with his wife Cathie in London when he was secretary of the London Vegetarian Society.

Semple was a vice-president of the International Vegetarian Union and honorary president of the Scottish Vegetarian Society.

A regular visitor to Ailsa Craig, he was known locally as the 'Bird Man' and was an enthusiast for outdoor living, publishing a book entitled A Free Man's Philosophy. He welcomed walkers and cyclists who often camped on his land.

In 1963, Dugald detailed his dietary journey:

I began rather drastically over 50 years ago [~1910] by cutting out not only all meat or flesh foods, but milk, eggs, butter, tea and coffee. Cheese I have never eaten; indeed I hate the very smell of this decayed milk. Next, I adopted a diet of nuts, fruit, cereals and vegetables. On this Edenic fare I lived for some ten years, and found that my health and strength were greatly improved. [...] While I was in London (during World War I), I found it necessary to add some dairy products to my meals, but on returning to Scotland I gradually eliminated these again.

In later life, he lived in a modern cottage and even owned a car.

== Fruitarianism ==
The Fruitarian Society was plagued with disputes over the definition of fruitarianism from as early as 1907. The Scottish Vegetarian Society featured an article in their 1907 journal entitled "Fruitarianism" by Semple, in which he wrote:

By fruitarianism is meant a dietary consisting chiefly of nuts and fruits. Cooked cereals and vegetables are not necessarily excluded, although the exclusion of all cooked foods, should means and knowledge permit, will lead to better results. For this dietary it will be noticed that not only is flesh and meat omitted, but also the animal products milk and eggs. The use of these products by vegetarians has long been one of the chief objections to vegetarianism, especially in medical circles.

Dugald stated, to make the point about "Lacto-Vegetarianism" stated that he had "never tasted cheese, and therefore it could not be considered as an essential 'binding agent' for body and soul!"

In 1912, Semple stated that he did not believe that milk and eggs were natural foods for man: "Eggs were meant to produce chickens and not omelettes; and cow's milk is a perfect food for a calf, but most assuredly not for a grown-up human being."

In his 1915 book, Joys of the Simple Life, he wrote an essay entitled "Alone with Nature", stating that "I left off eating flesh-meat and drinking tea ten years ago, and for over eight years have rarely used milk, eggs, salt, sugar, dairy butter, white bread, or condiments of any kind. My health has improved considerably and I have never regretted the change." In 1944, Semple wrote that his "experience on the land has convinced me that the use of dairy produce is even more cruel than the use of flesh foods".

Despite consuming a strict plant-based diet without dairy and eggs, Semple recommended a lacto-ovo vegetarian diet for others. In a 1952 article titled "Solving the Food Problem", he advocated a diet of baked potatoes, eggs, lentils, oatmeal, cheese, milk, nuts, wholemeal bread, fruit and vegetables to the general population. He commented that "butcher-meat is never an economical food, for the same land devoted to growing wheat or potatoes would produce then times more food than this land given to rearing livestock". Semple described honey as a health food and "excellent in all cases of malnutrition, liver and heart troubles".

== Influence ==
Committee positions

In 1938 Semple was the President of the Scottish Vegetarian Society (SVS) and Vice-President of the Vegetarian Society. In 1944, Semple is recorded as the chairman of the Vegan Society and vice-president of the International Vegetarian Union. In 1953 he was Honorary President of the Scottish Vegetarian Society. In 1954, Semple was still president of the SVS, one of several Vice-Presidents of IVU.

Lecture Tours

The Victoria Advocate newspaper of Texas reported that he lectured on his beliefs and way of life in the USA, Canada, and America.

From the August 1910 issue of the Vegetarian Messenger: "Mr. Dugald Semple, the Scottish apostle of the Simple Life, is arranging lecturing tours for the coming winter. He is prepared to give lectures for a modest fee, and we are sure that his services would be appreciated by vegetarian and allied societies. His address is Wheelhouse, Bridge of Weir, Scotland." The address appears to refer to his horse drawn caravan that can be seen in the photograph of Davie's o'the Mill.

Conferences

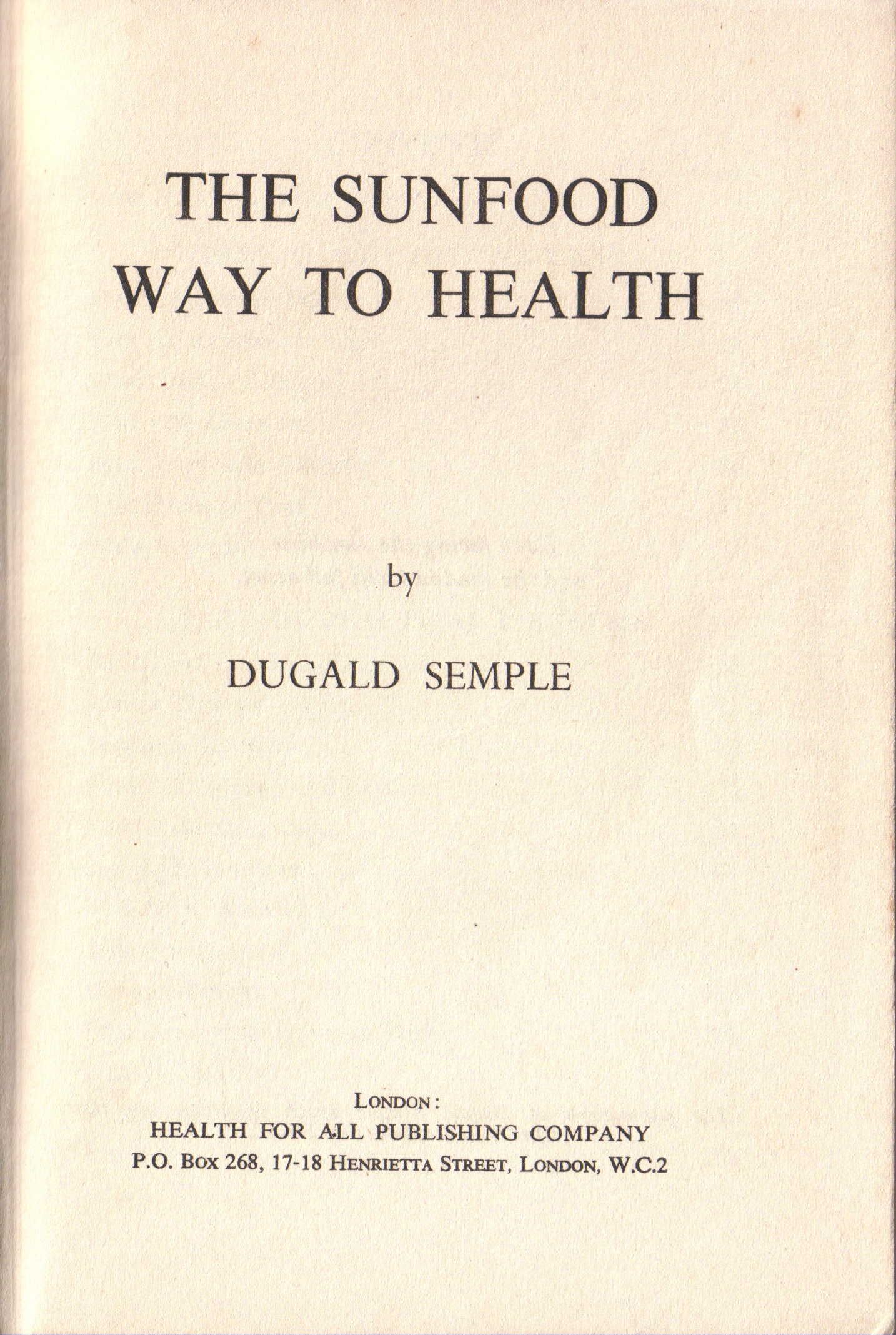
Title page of The Sunfood Way to Health

Semple was a delegate from Great Britain to the 1938 10th World Vegetarian Congress held in Norway, attending as President of the Scottish Vegetarian Society and Vice-President of The Vegetarian Society. He delivered a speech on "Vegetarianism and Peace", in which he stated:

Vegetarianism is not merely a matter of food reform – it is a philosophy of life, and war will only cease when we cease to live as beasts of prey. So long as we prepare for war we shall get war. We must not only study Darwin but also Kropotkin. Those animals which are carnivorous are becoming less and the vegetarian animals are increasing. Vegetarianism is the first great step. The killing of human beings is akin to the killing of animals and so the exploiting of animal life leads to the selfish exploitation of human beings.

Dugald quoted Robert Burns, appealing for a more widespread appreciation of the real values in life – more sunshine for the body, more love for the soul, peace for every living creature the world over.

In 1953, at the 15th World Vegetarian Congress held in India, Semple stated: "What a tragedy it would be if Mother India was to become estranged from her sympathy with the rights of animals, which although it may have been carried to extremes, nevertheless has been a noble example to the flesh-eating and vivisecting nations of the West." Yes, let us do our utmost to save India from the soulless materialism of imperialistic nations. Let us show that war and disease are the result of disobedience to spiritual and natural law. That if we harden our hearts against the everyday cruelty off flesh-eating and blood sports, we cannot wonder that the whole; so-called civilised world is preparing for another world catastrophe. East and West must meet if we are to hasten the coming of the New Jerusalem. We go forth to show that science is an affair of the heart as well as the head. That the poor Indian need not live on such a meagre diet, and that we must realise that without love the people perish. The basic error, as Maitra, editor of the Indian journal, once told me, "You people live beside yourself, we live from ourselves. It is only more life in the soul that can unite all people."

In 1955, at the World Vegetarian Congress in Paris, Semple was listed as a speaker.

Individuals

Morris Krok, born in Johannesburg, South Africa and whilst seeking solutions for his health problems was influenced by natural healing writers of the 20th century such as Dugald Semple, Vincent Priessnitz, Louis Kuhne, etc.

Government

Civilian rationing began at the end of World War I, on 1 January 1918, with sugar, then meat, butter, and margarine. The Government of the day consulted Semple and a colleague to educate people concerning how to ration available produce and other food and to propose acceptable substitutes for meat, which had become familiar in their diets.

No Stipend League

Semple organised a Scottish 'No Stipend League' against the Church of Scotland's practice of levying a tithe on landowners for the minister's stipend. He was particularly offended because the levy applied to landowners regardless of their faith.

== Death ==
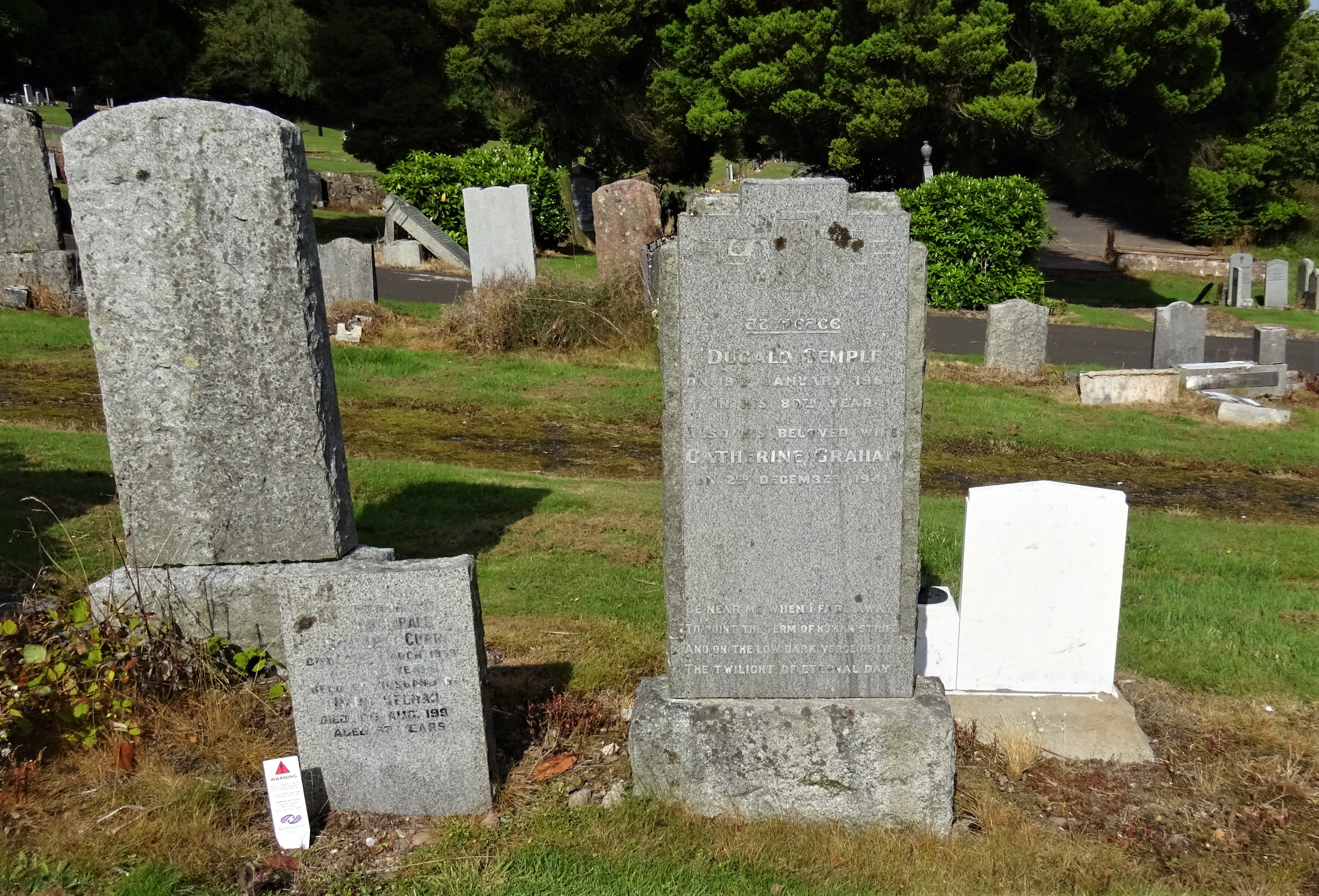
Dugald and Cathie's grave in Lochwinnoch Cemetery.

Semple died in a nursing home in Fairlie, aged 79; the cause of his death was not disclosed. Cathie Amos, his wife, predeceased him, dying of heart failure in 1941. They had no children, although Cathie had a son, Ian, who was killed in World War I.

== Published works ==
- Simple Life Visitors. Paisley: J & J Cook, printers, 1909.
- Living in Liberty: Or, The Wheelhouse Philosophy. Paisley: Alexander Gardner, 1911.
- Fruitarianism: A Treatise on the Diet Question. Paisley: Alexander Gardner, 1913.
- Joys of the Simple Life. London: G. Bell, 1915.
- Simple Life Recipes: With Hints on Diet. London: C. W. Daniel, 1915.
- Life in the Open. London: G. Bell, 1919.
- Diet and Good health: A Popular Treatise on the Food Question. London: C. W. Daniel, 1925.
- Diet in Relation to Climate. London: C. W. Daniel, c. 1928.
- A Free Man's Philosophy. London: C. W. Daniel, 1933.
- An Appeal for Freedom. c. 1935.
- What to Eat in War-time, with Meatless Recipes by Cathie Semple. Glasgow: William MacLellan, 1943.
- Be Your Own Doctor: Natural Cures for Common Ailments. Glasgow: William MacLellan, c. 1945. Contains details of cures for colds, constipation, how to slim, better eyesight, health from herbs etc.
- Looking at Nature. Glasgow: William MacLellan, c. 1946.
- A Scots Health Cookery Book, with Meatless Recipes by Cathie Semple. Glasgow: William MacLellan, 1949.
- Round Kintyre with Dugald Semple. Glasgow: William MacLellan, 1950.
- Home Cures for Common Ailments: With Curative Diet. Glasgow: William MacLellan, 1952.
- The Sunfood Way to Health. London: Health for All Publishing Co., 1956.
- Joy in Living. Glasgow: Maclellan, 1957.
