= F. P. Doremus =

American vegetarianism advocate (1852–1944)

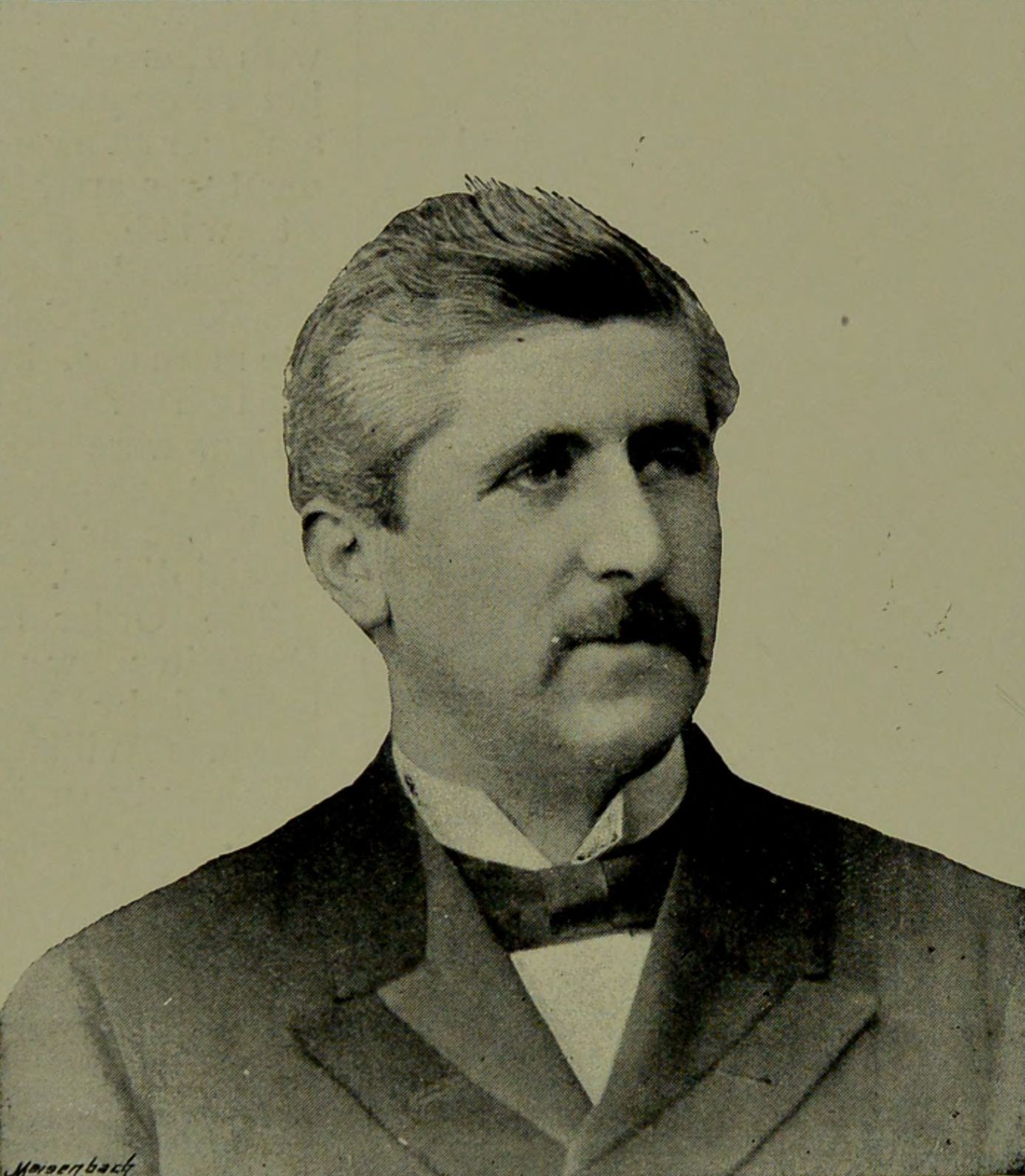
- Doremus in Fifty Years of Food Reform (1898)
- Born: Franklin Pierce Doremus; December 4, 1852; Brooklyn, New York, U.S.
- Died: November 25, 1944 (aged 91); Brighton, England
- Resting place: Downs Crematorium
- Occupation: Vegetarianism advocate
- Organizations: London Food Reform Society (1879–1885); London Vegetarian Society (1889–1890); Vegetarian Federal Union (1892–1895); Vegetarian Society of America
- Known for: Work for British and American vegetarian organizations
- Spouses: Mary Anne Troward (m. 1872; died 1886) Melita Caroline "Millie" Anderson (m. 1888; died 1927) Minnie Brown (m. 1932)
- Children: 1

Signature
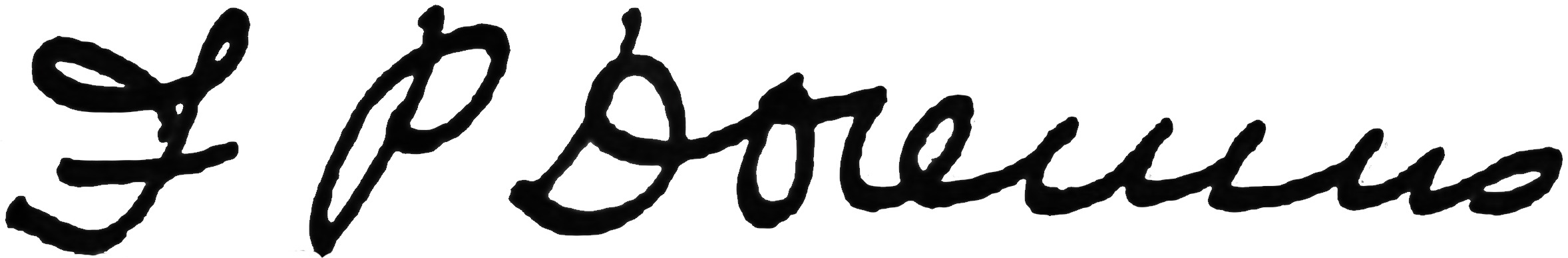

Franklin Pierce Doremus (December 4, 1852 – November 25, 1944) was an American vegetarianism advocate. Based in Britain in the late 19th century, he was secretary of the London Food Reform Society from 1879 to 1885, editor of its Food Reform Magazine from 1881 to 1885, secretary of the London Vegetarian Society from 1889 to 1890, and secretary of the Vegetarian Federal Union from 1892 to 1895. He was also a vice-president of the Vegetarian Society of America.

== Biography ==
=== Early life ===
Franklin Pierce Doremus was born in Brooklyn, New York, on December 4, 1852, to Gilbert and Rachel Doremus.

=== Vegetarian activism ===
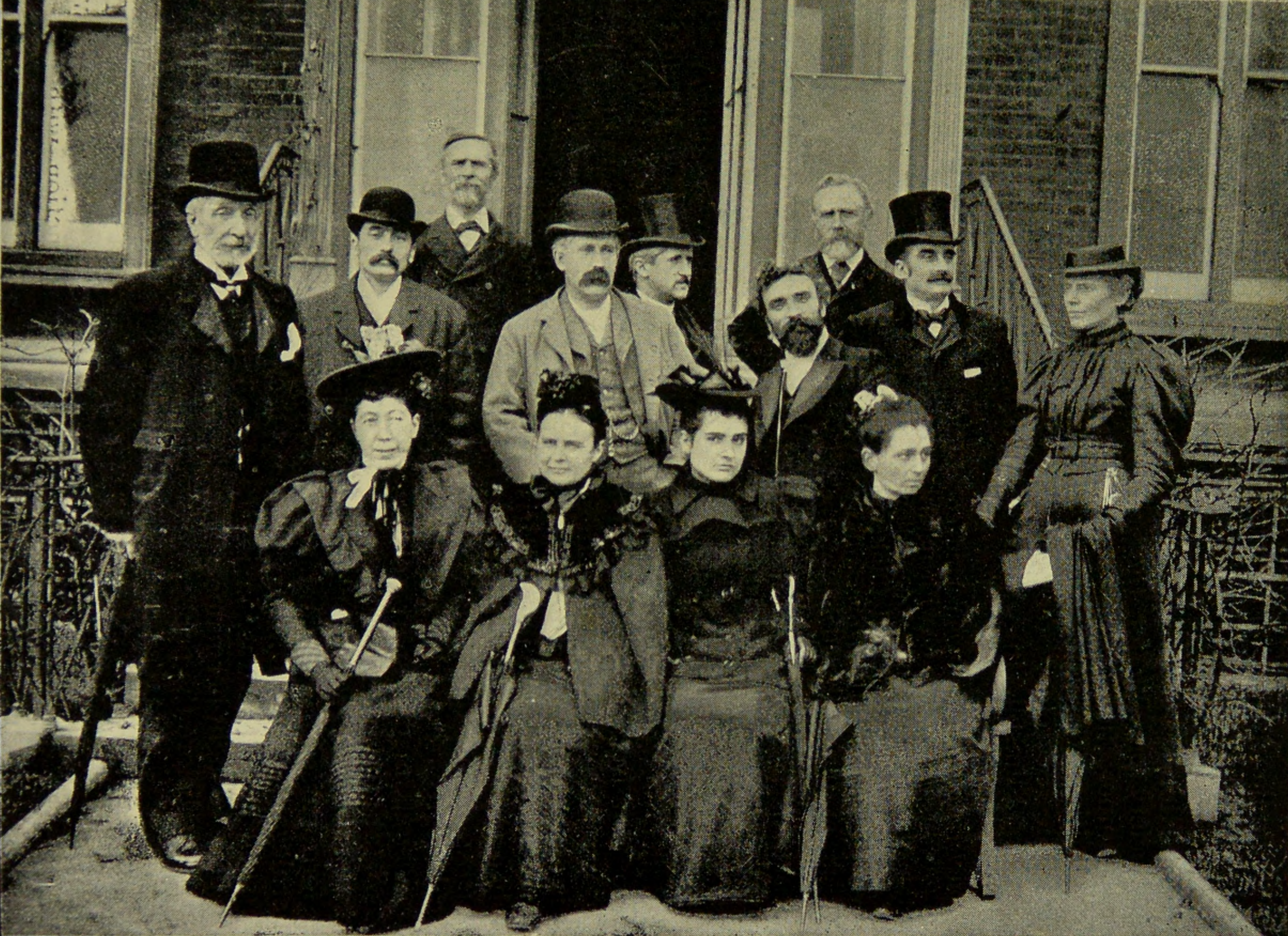
Doremus (back row, fifth from left) at the Vegetarian Congress in Brighton, 1894

==== London Food Reform Society ====
Doremus, then living in Camden, joined the London Food Reform Society. He was secretary of the society from 1879 to 1885 and edited its magazine, Food Reform Magazine, from 1881 to 1885.

On March 22, 1884, around 80 people attended a vegetarian banquet at the Apple Tree Restaurant, London Wall, to mark Doremus's departure for the United States. It was chaired by Lord Byron. Attendees included Rev. W. J. Monk, Mr. and Mrs. Wallace, Mr. and Mrs. Bowden Green, Mr. T. R. Allinson, Mr. W. Couchman, Mr. R. E. O'Callaghan, Mr. C. W. Forward, and Mr. M. Nunn. While Doremus was abroad, his duties as secretary were to be undertaken by O'Callaghan.

==== Work in the United States ====
On July 18, 1884, the San Antonio Express-News reported on a meeting of vegetarians at Dr. M. L. Holbrook's Hygienic Hotel and Turkish Bath Institute in Manhattan, New York. Doremus was described as an American emissary of the Food Reform Society of Great Britain. He distributed vegetarian tracts and gave the opening address, in which he criticised heavy meat diets, argued that dietary change could reduce illness, and said vegetarianism was cheaper and could help feed the poor more economically. He also offered to undergo a physician-supervised diet test, eating vegetables "quantity for quantity" against a meat-eater.

After the Vegetarian Society of America was organised in 1886 and incorporated the following year, Doremus served as a vice-president.

==== Return to Britain ====
On returning to Britain, Doremus was secretary of the London Vegetarian Society from 1889 to 1890 and secretary of the Vegetarian Federal Union from 1892 to 1895. He edited The Vegetarian Year Book, 1897 for the Union.

In 1889, Doremus wrote in The Vegetarian that in the 1850s vegetarianism had been associated with "many other reforms", and that it made greater progress only after "outside issues" had fallen away. He also wrote that vegetarianism was sometimes treated as a religion that required acceptance of other "antis" as articles of faith.

=== Other work ===
Doremus moved to Horsham in 1911, where he was a member of the old Dutch Baptist Community and the Society of Friends; he lived there for 30 years.

During the First World War, he lectured on vegetarianism and peace. He also served as an official of the British and Foreign Sailors' Society.

=== Personal life and death ===
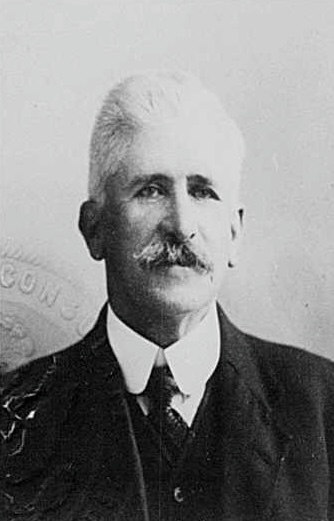
Doremus, c. 1915

Doremus was married three times. He married Mary Anne Troward on May 16, 1872, in Kings County, New York; she died in 1886, aged 50. He married Melita Caroline "Millie" Anderson on January 3, 1888, at Beddington, Surrey; they had a daughter, Melita Franklin (b. 1890), who was killed in a mountaineering accident in Austria in 1933. Anderson died in 1927, aged 76. In 1932, he married Minnie Brown at Horsham.

Doremus moved to Brighton because of failing health. He died at Brighton Hospital on November 25, 1944, aged 91. He was cremated at Downs Crematorium, Brighton, on December 2. An obituary was published in The Vegetarian News.

== See also ==
- History of vegetarianism
- Vegetarianism in the Victorian era
- Vegetarianism in the United Kingdom
- Vegetarianism in the United States

== Works ==
- Food Reform Magazine. London Food Reform Society. 1881–1885.
- The Vegetarian Year Book, 1897. London: Vegetarian Federal Union. 1897.
