= Imogen Hassall =

English actress (1942–1980)

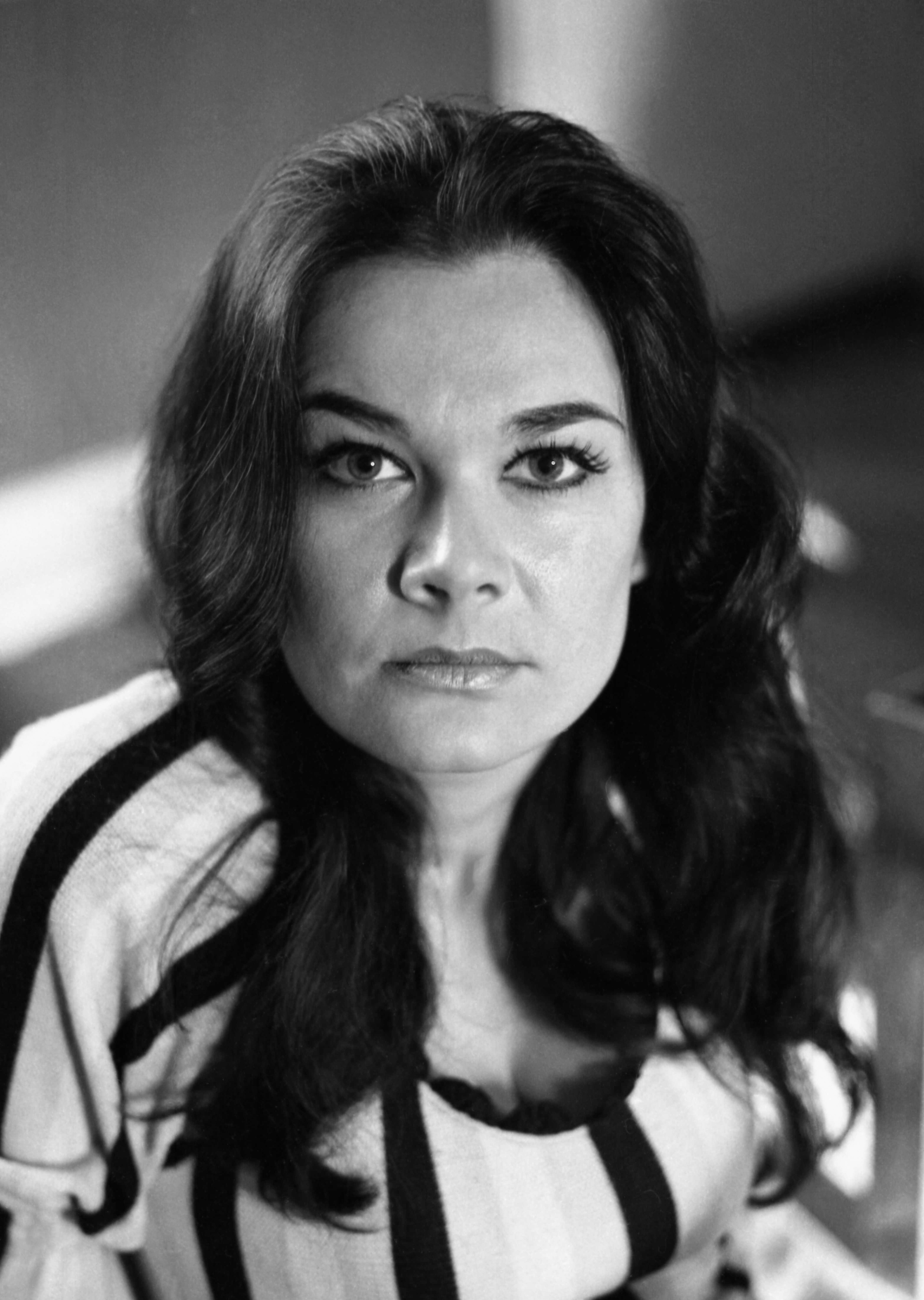
- Imogen Hassall in 1976 (Photograph by Allan Warren)
- Born: 25 August 1942; Woking, Surrey, England
- Died: 16 November 1980 (aged 38); Wimbledon, London, England
- Resting place: Gap Road Cemetery, Wimbledon, London, England
- Education: London Academy of Music and Dramatic Art
- Occupations: Actress; model
- Years active: 1963–1980
- Spouses: Kenneth Ives (m. 1974; div. 1978) Andrew Knox (m. 1979; div. 1979)

Imogen Hassall (25 August 1942 – 16 November 1980) was an English actress who appeared in 33 films during the 1960s and 1970s.

== Early life ==
Named after Shakespeare's Cymbeline heroine, she was born in Woking, Surrey, to a financially comfortable family of artists and businessmen. Her grandfather, John Hassall, and her aunt, Joan Hassall, worked as illustrators, while her father, Christopher Hassall, was a poet, dramatist and lyricist. Being the biographer of Rupert Brooke added to his prestige and an untimely death in 1963 cut his daughter adrift in the upper levels of the British cultural establishment. Her vivacity notwithstanding she could not properly navigate her future years to the full benefit of her talents although as the record shows attention to her was much made. There was a brother, Nicholas. Her godfather is said to have been the composer Ivor Novello, with whom her father had worked extensively as lyricist; conversely, on occasion Hassall would proudly claim that this distinction was Sir William Walton's with whom her father had collaborated in the early 1950s, denied by Lady Walton.

== Career ==
Hassall boarded and attended Elmhurst Ballet School, Camberley 1952–1954 and the Royal Ballet School, White Lodge, Richmond Park 1955–1958. Later in 1958 (aged 16) she studied in New York City, then returned to live with family in the Vale of Health by Hampstead Heath, London. She continued her absorption of the theatre mode with study at the London Academy of Music and Dramatic Art 1960–1962, following which she joined the company of the Royal Shakespeare Company for one season.

After enjoying an appearance in the William Douglas-Home comedy "The Reluctant Peer" at the Duchess Theatre in 1964, she appeared in British TV adventure series of the 1960s such as The Saint, The Avengers and The Persuaders! In her first significant film role, she played Tara in The Long Duel (1967). She gained further public notice as a dominant cave-girl in When Dinosaurs Ruled the Earth (1970) and played major roles in Carry On Loving and the cult horror film Incense for the Damned the same year. In 1973, she appeared in White Cargo alongside David Jason.

== Personal life ==
Hassall was married to actor Kenneth Ives, and before they were married, they had a daughter called Melanie Ives Hassall, who died four days after being born in 1972. She was briefly married to actor Andrew Knox (the son of actors Alexander Knox and Doris Nolan), who later committed suicide in 1987, but they separated after a few months of marriage, and she lost the baby she was expecting.

Hassall's private life was a regular subject of interest in tabloid newspapers. She was known for playing sexy, scantily clad characters in film and on TV. This, and the revealing outfits she wore at film premieres, resulted in her being referred to as the "Countess of Cleavage".

== Death ==
After her failed relationships, the death of her child, her miscarriage, and her career decline, Hassall became depressed. Following previous suicide attempts, she was found dead in her Wimbledon home on the morning of 16 November 1980, after failing to meet a friend, the actress Suzanna Leigh, with whom she was due to go on holiday later that day. It was ruled that she had overdosed on Tuinal tablets. Her body was interred in Gap Road Cemetery, Wimbledon, London.

== Filmography ==
=== Film ===
- The Bulldog Breed (1960) - Girl in Cinema (uncredited)
- The Cracksman (1963) – Guv'nor 's Secretary
- The Mind Benders (1963) – Girl Student
- The Early Bird (1965) – Sir Roger's Secretary
- Press for Time (1966) – Suffragette (uncredited)
- The Long Duel (1967) – Tara
- Bedtime (1967) - The Woman (Short film, banned by the BBFC, limited London release)
- Mumsy, Nanny, Sonny and Girly (1970) – Girlfriend
- The Virgin and the Gypsy (1970) – The Gypsy's Wife
- Toomorrow (1970) – Amy
- Carry On Loving (1970) – Jenny Grubb
- El Condor (1970) – Dolores
- When Dinosaurs Ruled the Earth (1970) – Ayak
- Take a Girl Like You (1970) – Samantha
- Incense for the Damned (1971) – Chriseis
- White Cargo (1973) – Stella
- Licensed to Love and Kill (1979) – Miss Martin (final film role)

=== Television ===
- The Sentimental Agent (1 episode, 1963) – Nikki
- The Dickie Henderson Show (1 episode, 1963)
- It Happened Like This (1 episode, 1963) – Miss Jeryl
- Moonstrike (2 episodes, 1963)
- The Scales Of Justice (1 episode, 1964) – Yvonne Purvis
- The Reluctant Peer (1 episode, 1964)
- The Saint (3 episodes, 1964–1968) – Malia / Nadya / Sophia Arnetas
- No Hiding Place (1 episode, 1965) – Jane Bowden
- The Lance Percival Show - (1 episode, 1965)
- A Touch of Don Juan (1 episode, 1966)
- Theatre 625 (1 episode, 1967) – Madame Kanyl
- The Avengers (1 episode, 1967) – Anjali
- The Wednesday Play (2 episodes, 1967–1968) – Yasmina / Rogation (voice)
- Champion House (1 episode, 1967) – Christina
- Play of the Month (1 episode, 1967) – Ata
- Mickey Dunne (1 episode, 1967) - Veronica Cole
- The Troubleshooters (1 episode, 1967) – Nancy Clucas
- The Champions (1 episode, 1968) – Cleo
- Call My Bluff (1 episode, 1969) - Herself
- Softly, Softly (1 episode, 1970) – Molly Carson
- The Simon Dee Show (1 episode, 1970) - Herself
- Dear Mother...Love Albert (1 episode, 1970) - Girl (uncredited)
- The Persuaders! (1 episode, 1971) – Maria Lorenzo
- On The House (1 episode, 1971) – Thelma
- Celluloid Love (The Hassalls) - (TV Documentary 1971) - Herself
- Jason King (1 episode, 1972) – Gina
- ...And Mother Makes Three (1 episode, 1972) – Virginia
- Going for a Song (1 episode, 1972) - Herself
- Images (1 episode, 1972) - One-off special
- The Movie Quiz (2 episodes, 1972–3) - Herself

== Bibliography ==
- Biography: Leissner, D. (2002). Tuesday's Child: The Life and Death of Imogen Hassall. Baltimore, MD: Luminary Press. ISBN 1-887664-47-5.
- Obituary: Donnelley, P. (2005). Fade to Black: A Book of Movie Obituaries. Omnibus Press. pp. 315–316. ISBN 1-844494-30-6.
