= Charles W. Forward =

English activist and writer (1863–1934)

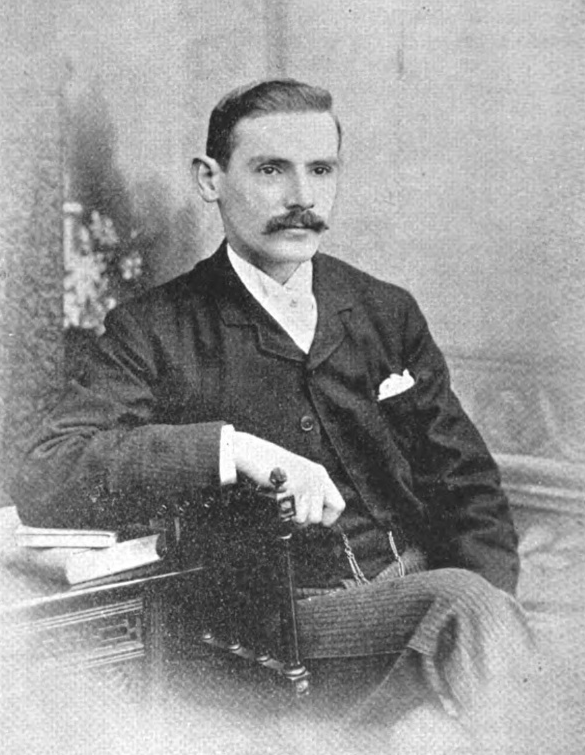
- Forward, c. 1897
- Born: Charles Walter Forward; 19 August 1863; Islington, Middlesex, England
- Died: 9 June 1934 (aged 70); Watford, England
- Resting place: Gap Road Cemetery
- Occupations: Activist; writer; editor; historian
- Known for: Animal rights and vegetarianism activism
- Notable work: Fifty Years of Food Reform (1898)
- Spouse: Florance Kate Cramp (m. 1888)
- Children: 3

Charles Walter Forward (19 August 1863 – 9 June 1934) was an English activist for animal rights and vegetarianism, writer, editor, and historian. He was involved in the vegetarian movement from the late 19th century and wrote Fifty Years of Food Reform (1898), a history of the movement in England.

== Biography ==
=== Early life and family ===
Charles Walter Forward was born in Islington, Middlesex, on 19 August 1863, to Charles John Forward and his wife Catherine. He was his parents' only surviving child. According to James Gregory, Forward had poor health in youth and his education was often limited for health reasons; this led to an interest in physiology.

Forward became a vegetarian in 1878 after reading a passage from William Cullen in Richard Phillips's A Million of Facts. (Note: "Vegetable aliment, as neither distending the vessels, nor loading the system, never interrupts the stronger action of the mind; while the heat, fullness, and weight of animal food is adverse to its efforts.")

=== Career ===
Forward joined the Vegetarian Society in 1881 while working as a bookbinder at 6 Blackfriars Road, London. Gregory describes him as a leading London vegetarian who had a close but critical association with A. F. Hills. He later served as vice-president of the society.

Forward worked in vegetarian journalism, serving as editor of the Herald of Health and founding the Hygienic/Vegetarian Review. He also published works on vegetarianism and has been described as a historian of the vegetarian movement.

Forward's first published work was The Manual of Vegetarianism: A Complete Guide to Food Reform, co-authored with R. E. O'Callaghan in 1890. He wrote a cookery book commissioned by J. S. Virtue in 1891 and edited the Vegetarian Yearbook, Birthday Book (1898), and Jubilee Library.

In 1893, he published a satire through Nichols titled Confessions of a Vegetarian, which focused on London vegetarian personalities. The same year, he collaborated with C. D. Steele on a musical sketch, "Only a Crossing Sweeper". By 1895, he was involved with the South London Food Reform Society and announced a journal called Pure Food, the Journal of the Food Reform Movement, which Gregory states was probably not produced.

In 1897, Forward advocated the amalgamation of vegetarian journals. That year, he edited and published a new edition of John Smith's vegetarian treatise Fruits and Farinacea. The edition was criticised by The British Medical Journal, which described the work as unscientific.

At the National Vegetarian Congress in 1899, Forward argued that although the vegetarian movement was growing, the number of vegetarian restaurants in London had declined. He also noted the wider availability of cheap tinned meat and stated that some restaurants described as vegetarian were not strictly vegetarian because they served meat dishes.

In the early 20th century, he edited the short-lived London Vegetarian Association Quarterly. In 1913, Forward contributed the chapter "Slaughter-House Cruelties" to The Under Dog, edited by Sidney Trist. He also edited The Animals' Guardian, a monthly periodical subtitled "A Humane Journal for the Better Protection of Animals", published by the London and Provincial Anti-Vivisection Society.

During World War I, Forward was associated with the Blue Cross Mission and was a delegate at the International Vegetarian Union in Stockholm. He gave lectures for the London Vegetarian Society and the National Food Reform Demonstration Council, and worked at the Ebury Street Nature Cure Clinic.

His other journalistic projects included The Bohemian (1887) and, in 1929, the quarterly New Life, announced in the Danielite Star. The latter focused on health and nature cure.

=== Fifty Years of Food Reform ===
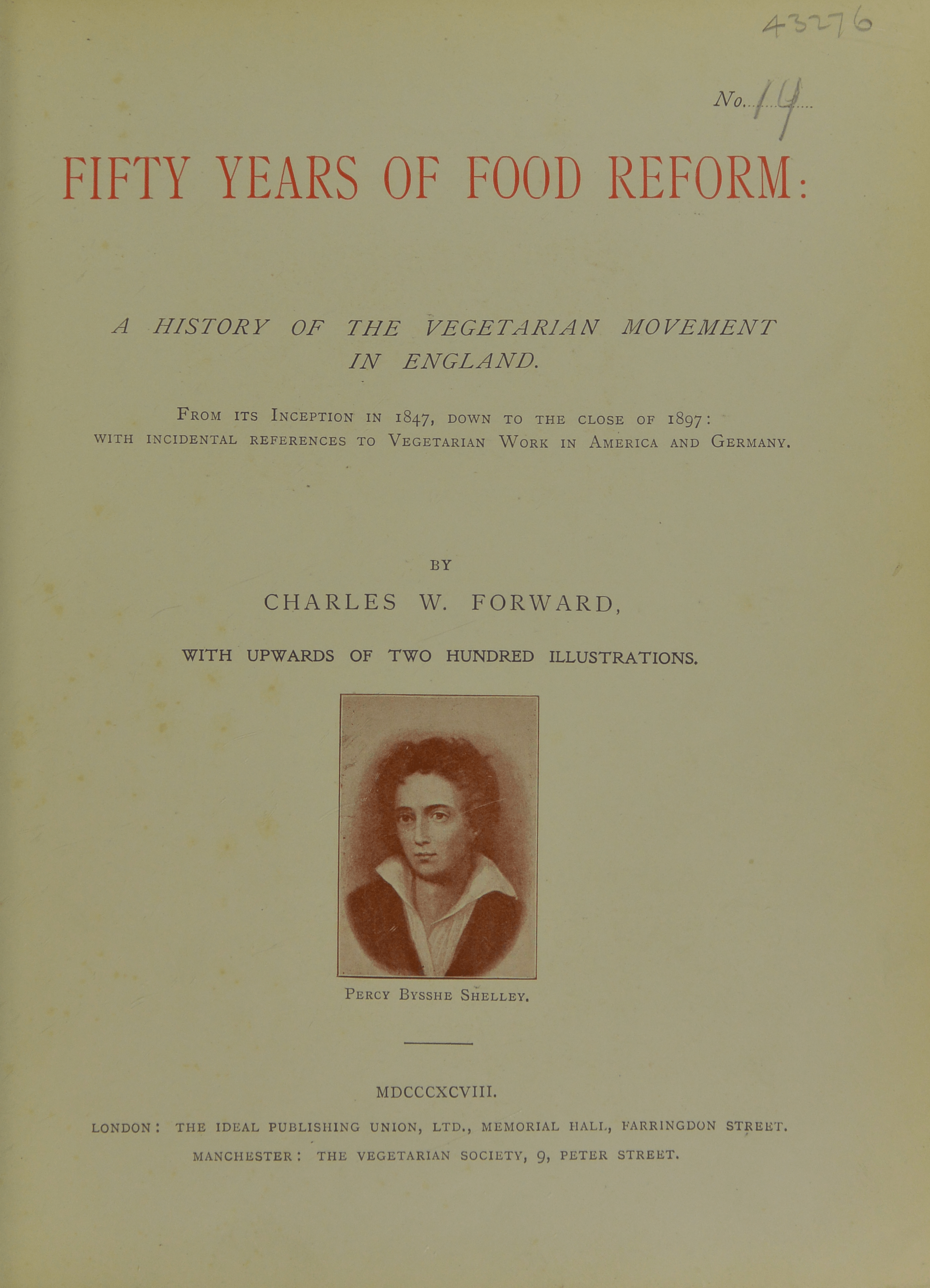
Title page of Fifty Years of Food Reform

In 1897, Forward published a series of articles for the Jubilee year of the Vegetarian Society on the history of the vegetarian movement in The Vegetarian Review. The following year, these articles formed Fifty Years of Food Reform: A History of the Vegetarian Movement in England.

The book documented the history of the movement from the classical period onward, including writers such as Pythagoras, Ovid, Seneca, and Plutarch, together with 18th-century poets and writers. It covered vegetarians including William Lambe, G. Nicholson, John Frank Newton, John Oswald, Richard Phillips, Joseph Ritson, and Percy Bysshe Shelley. It contains more than 200 illustrations, including a map of London vegetarian restaurants.

=== Diet theories ===
Forward argued that many diseases, including cancer, resulted from modern dietary habits and from departure from what he considered a natural vegetarian diet based on fruit and vegetables. In 1912, Forward was elected chairman of the Society for the Prevention and Relief of Cancer. From 1914, he lectured on cancer and diet, including at The Polytechnic in Regent Street, where he spoke on the causes and prevention of cancer. Like Robert Bell and Douglas Macmillan, he argued that meat eating was a major cause of cancer.

=== Personal life and death ===
Forward married Florance Kate Cramp in Wandsworth in 1888. They had three children.

Forward on 9 June 1934 in Watford, aged 70. He was buried at Gap Road Cemetery, Wimbledon, on 13 June.

== Publications ==
- Cow's Milk as a Cause of Disease. London Vegetarian Society.
- Value of Fats and Oils. London Vegetarian Society.
- The Manual of Vegetarianism: A Complete Guide to Food Reform. With R. E. O'Callaghan. 1890.
- Practical Vegetarian Recipes. 1891.
- Cameos of Vegetarian Literature. 1898.
- Dulce Sodalitium: A Selection of Stories and Sketches by Vegetarian Writers. 1898.
- Popular Vegetarian Cookery. 1898.
- Fifty Years of Food Reform: A History of the Vegetarian Movement in England. 1898.
- Vegetariana: A Collection of Facts and Opinions on the Subject of Food Reform. 1900.
- The Food of the Future: A Summary of Arguments in Favour of a Non-Flesh Diet. 1904.
- Slaughter-House Cruelties. 1913.
- Under the Blue Cross. 1915.
- Vegetarian Races and Their Diet. 1921.
- The Fruit of the Tree: An Argument on Behalf of Man's Primitive and Natural Diet. 1922.
- Butcher's Meat, and its Effects Upon the Human Body. 1923.
- Health-Giving Dishes. 1924.
- Nuts: Their Cultivation, Composition and Use as Food. 1924.
- The Golden Calf: An Exposure of Vaccine Therapy. 1932.
