= Vegetarian Federal Union =

Defunct British vegetarian umbrella organisation

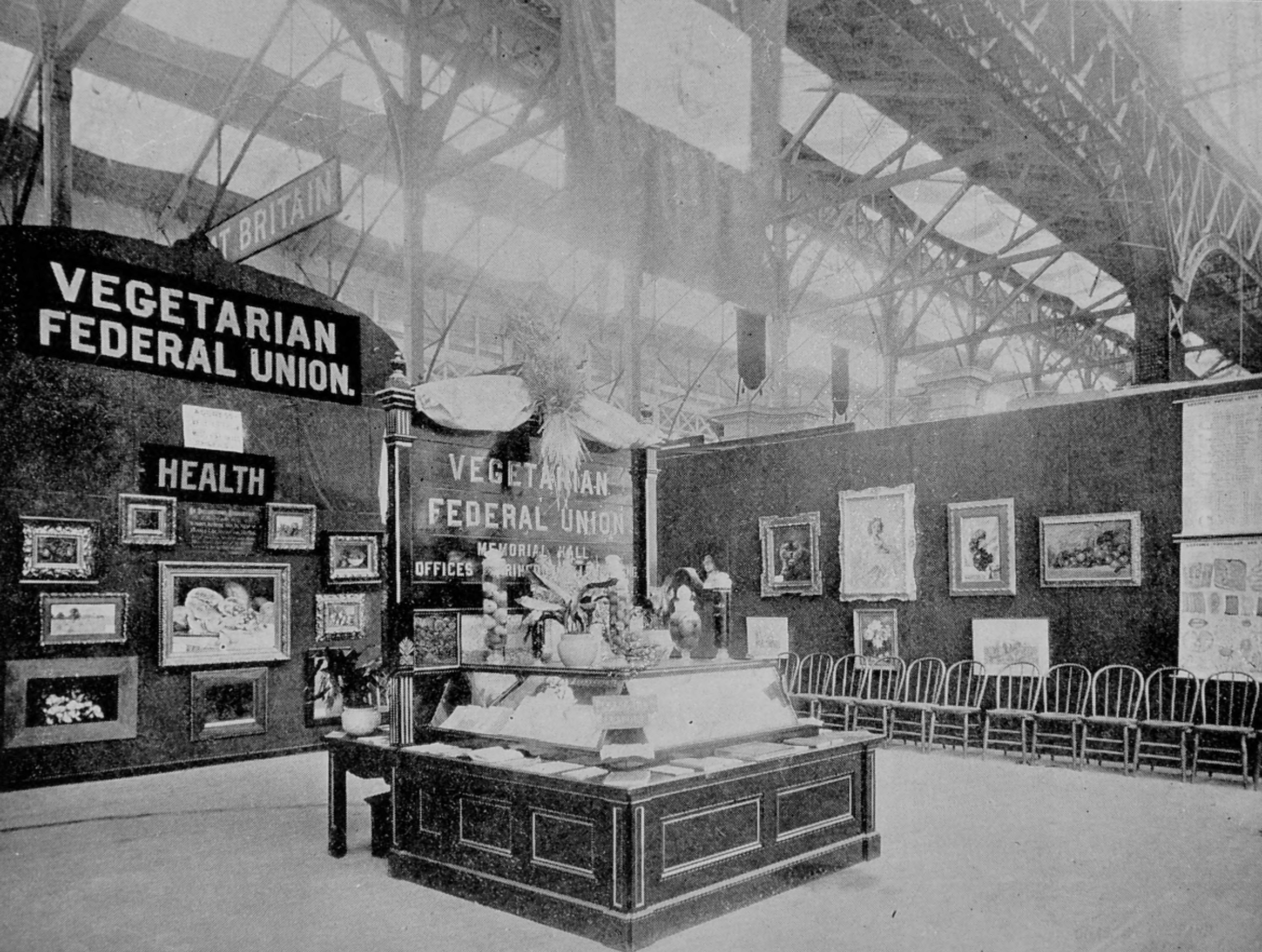
- Vegetarian Federal Union stall at the World's Columbian Exposition, 1893
- Abbreviation: VFU
- Successor: International Vegetarian Union
- Formation: 1 October 1889; 137 years ago
- Dissolved: 1911; 115 years ago
- Type: Umbrella organisation
- Headquarters: Memorial Hall, London, England
- Region served: Worldwide
- Methods: Federation of local societies; congresses and meetings; publications and publicity
- Chairman: Arnold Hills
- Key people: W. E. A. Axon (vice-chairman); R. E. O'Callaghan (secretary; 1889–1892); Franklin P. Doremus (secretary; 1892–1895); Josiah Oldfield (secretary; from 1895)
- Main organ: The Vegetarian; The Vegetarian Review
- Affiliations: Dansk Vegetarisk Forening; Dutch Vegetarian Society; London Vegetarian Association; Scottish Vegetarian Society; Vegetarian Society; Women's Vegetarian Union

The Vegetarian Federal Union (VFU) was a British umbrella organisation for vegetarian societies, founded in London in 1889 and active until 1911. It brought together affiliated local and overseas societies, held meetings and congresses, and published the quarterly The Vegetarian Review. Its activities included the 1893 World Vegetarian Congress in Chicago and later international vegetarian congresses in Britain. After the International Vegetarian Union was founded in 1908, the VFU's international role diminished, and the organisation lapsed by 1911.

== History ==
=== Formation ===
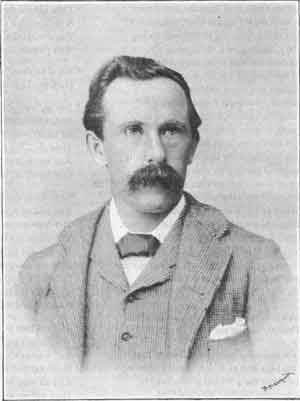
Arnold Hills, chairman of the VFU, 1889

The Vegetarian Federal Union developed after tensions between the Manchester-based Vegetarian Society and the newly independent London Vegetarian Society, which had broken away in 1888 under the leadership of Arnold Hills.

In June 1889 the London society proposed a nationwide "Vegetarian Union" in which each society's votes were weighted by its membership. The following month, individuals from the London society met and drafted plans for what became the VFU.

In September, after the first International Vegetarian Congress in Cologne, Germany, the organisers expanded their proposal to include a wider federation of vegetarian societies. Hills described the aim as follows:

The union of our English Vegetarian Societies, for common work and counsel, is but the presage of that larger federation, whereof all nations are the units.

The VFU was formally established at a meeting at Memorial Hall, London on 1 October 1889. Hills was elected chairman, W. E. A. Axon vice-chairman, and R. E. O'Callaghan secretary.

=== Activities ===
==== Meetings and publications ====
Early VFU business was conducted through meetings in London and Manchester in October 1889, followed by further meetings in provincial centres; the union was headquartered at Memorial Hall.

From late 1889, The Vegetarian, a periodical published in London by Hills, carried a regular VFU page for the secretary's reports and notices of coming events.

The VFU's meetings continued on a semi-annual cycle in the 1890s, sometimes described as autumn or annual congresses and combined with paper readings. In 1893 the union launched the quarterly journal The Vegetarian Review, and in 1895 it introduced monthly Executive and Editorial Committee meetings in London to manage reports and notices for The Vegetarian.

==== Organisation and leadership ====
In 1892 the American vegetarian activist Franklin P. Doremus succeeded R. E. O'Callaghan as secretary and served until 1895. He had earlier been honorary secretary of the National Food Reform Society (1879–1885) and the first secretary of the London Vegetarian Society (1889–1890). He was succeeded by Oldfield, who also edited The Vegetarian until December 1896, when John Ablett replaced him. In March 1895 the committee included Adrienne Veigele, May Yates, Henry B. Amos, and O'Callaghan, then serving as an agent for the southern counties.

==== Affiliations and congresses ====
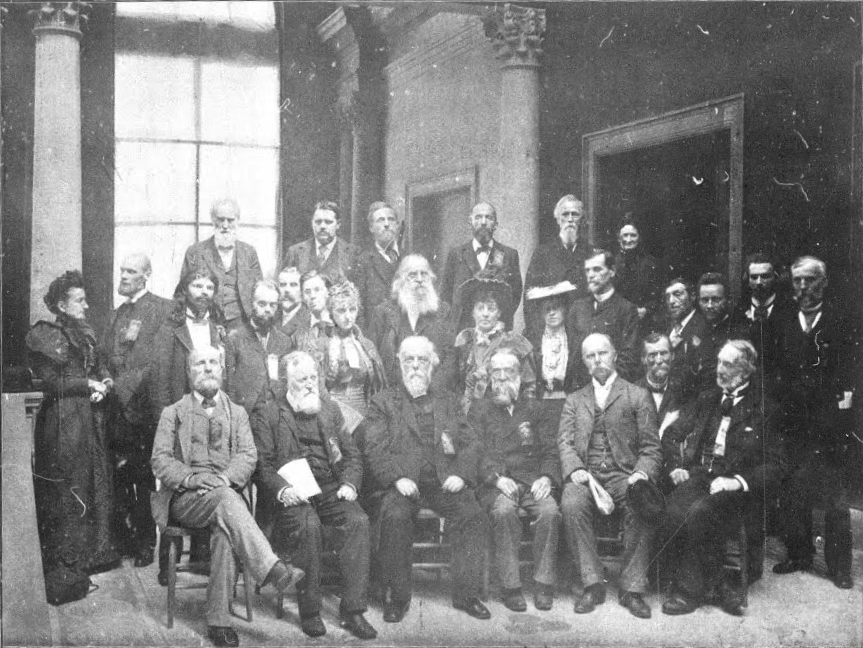
Vegetarian delegates at the World's Columbian Exposition, June 1893

Membership and correspondence were initially centred in Britain. Applications accepted at the September 1890 London meeting included three additional English groups, the Vegetarian Society of America, and the Irish Vegetarian Union; two German societies sought affiliation during the 1890 London congress. Much routine activity consisted of the VFU secretary's lecture tours and visits to local societies reported in The Vegetarian.

The union coordinated activity among affiliated societies and organised the World Vegetarian Congress in Chicago in 1893. Around forty papers from international contributors were presented, and the proceedings, nearly 250 pages, were published as a special issue of the Hygienic Review. The VFU also had a stall at the World's Columbian Exposition, with English delegates attending and May Yates and Carrica Le Favre serving as secretaries to the Congress.

In 1897 the VFU arranged the autumn International Vegetarian Congress in London, which Charles W. Forward described as among the most successful and best attended congresses the union had held in the city.

In its 1897 annual report, the VFU listed affiliated or reporting societies in England, Scotland, Wales, Ireland, Denmark, Germany, the Netherlands, the United States and New South Wales, as well as the Women's Vegetarian Union.

=== Relationship with other organisations ===
==== London Vegetarian Association ====
In 1895 the London Vegetarian Association was created as a local federation alongside the London Vegetarian Society. This added to uncertainty over the roles of the London societies and the VFU, noted in contemporary correspondence and meeting minutes.

==== Vegetarian Society ====
Forward wrote that the Vegetarian Society regarded the VFU as a possible challenge to its position as a national body and to its practice of working and collecting subscriptions without geographic restriction. He also recorded that in 1894 Hills urged that national coordination be undertaken by the VFU rather than the Society, proposing that the Society limit its remit; the proposal was declined.

=== Later developments and dissolution ===
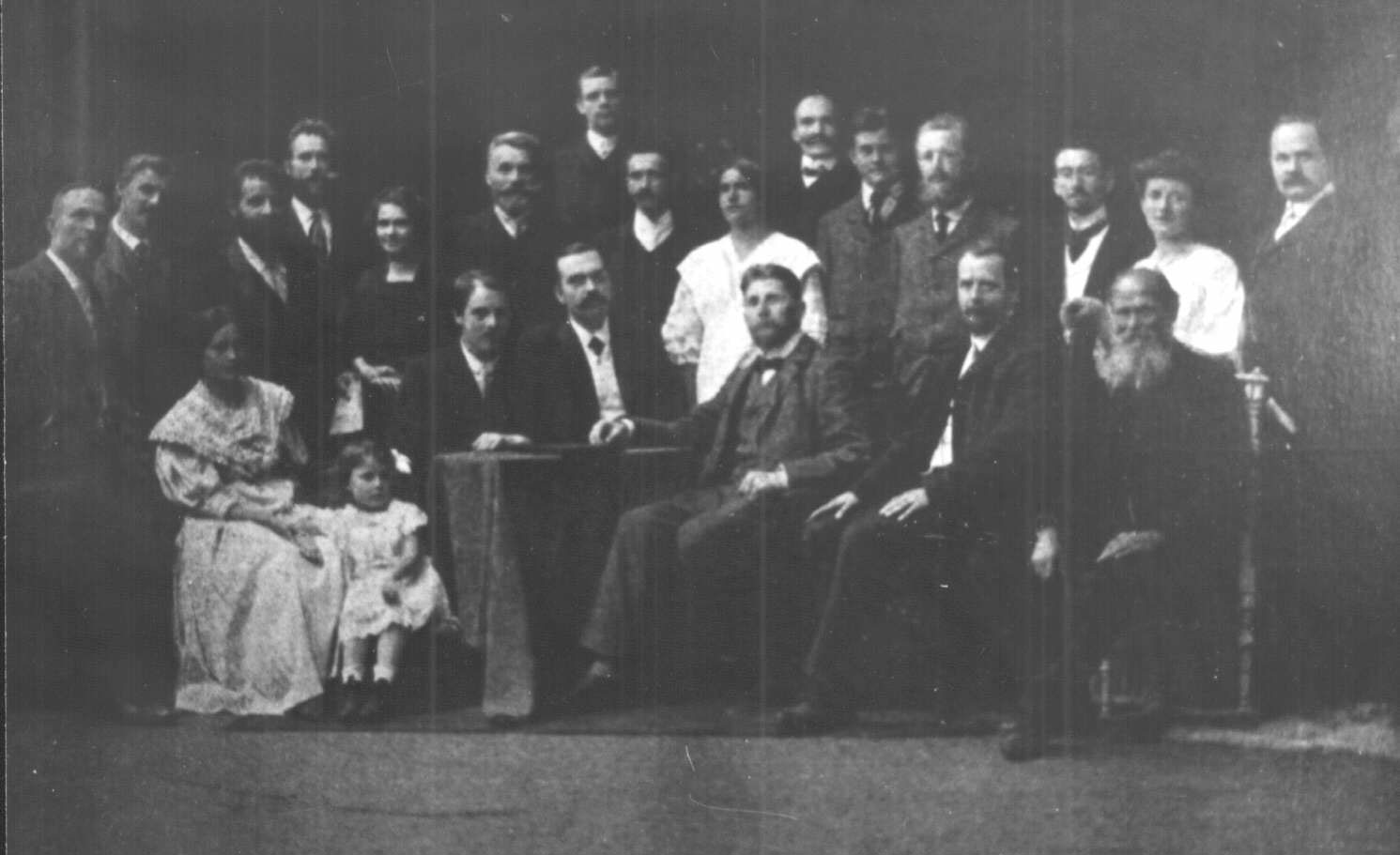
Participants at the first World Vegetarian Congress, Dresden, 1908

Participation beyond Britain remained limited. Annual and semi-annual meetings were usually held in London, and overseas representation was often by proxy rather than in person, a practice criticised by American counterparts. By the mid-1900s, VFU international congresses had little non-British input and were sometimes held alongside functions of London associations.

In 1908 the Vegetarian Society led an initiative that resulted in the creation of the International Vegetarian Union at the first World Vegetarian Congress in Dresden; the VFU and London bodies sent letters of support but no delegates.

The Vegetarian continued for a time as the organ of the VFU, but by 1911 the union's congresses had become local London gatherings. The VFU lapsed soon after.

== Publications ==
- The Vegetarian Review
- The Vegetarian (1888–1903)

== See also ==
- List of vegetarian and vegan organizations
- History of vegetarianism
- Vegetarianism in the Victorian era
