= Thirty-nine Reasons Why I Am a Vegetarian =

1903 publication by Henry Stephen Clubb

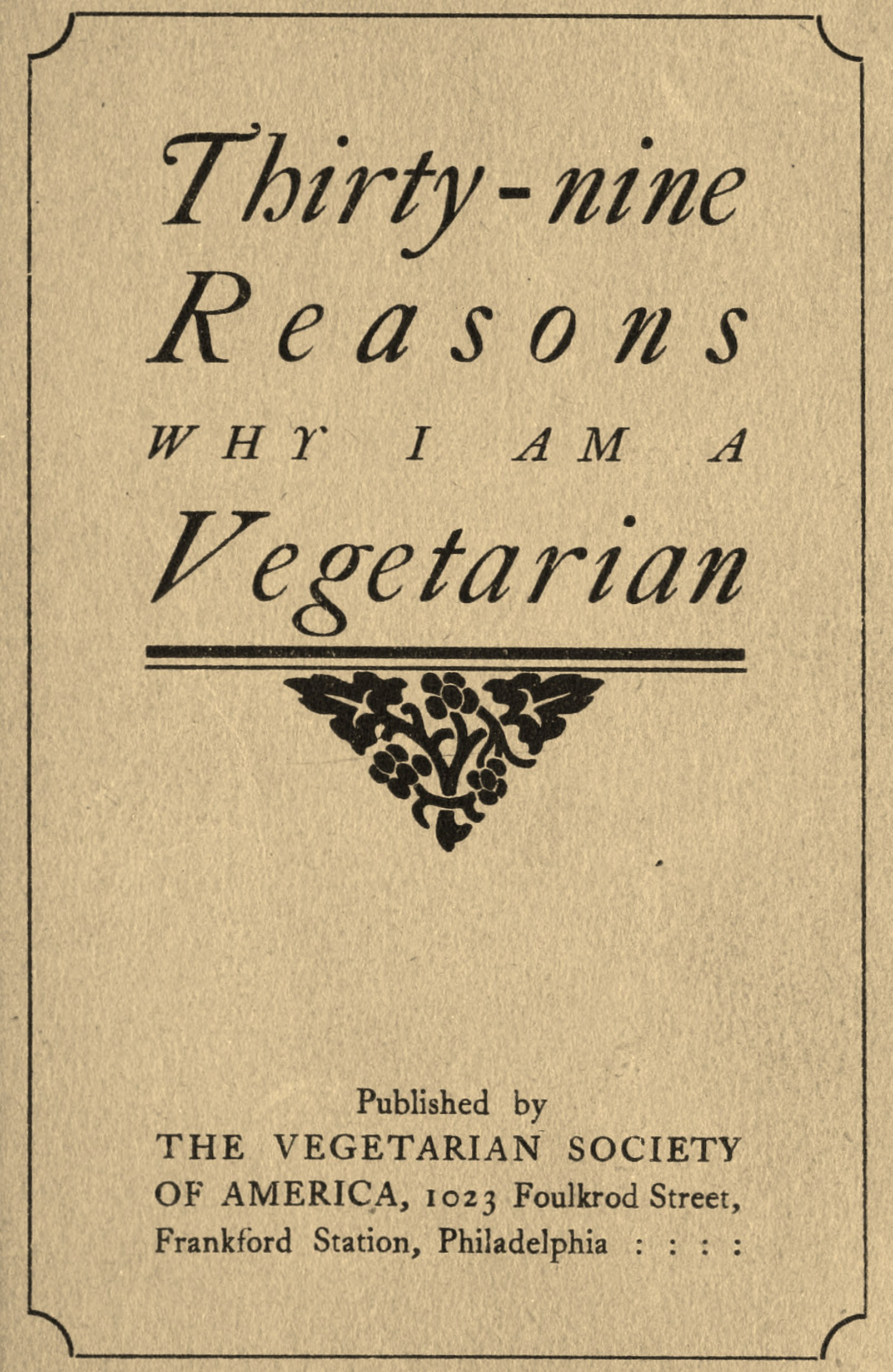
- Front matter from the 1903 publication.
- Author: Henry Stephen Clubb
- Language: English
- Genre: Vegetarianism
- Publisher: Vegetarian Society of America
- Publication place: United States
- Media type: Print (paperback)
- Pages: 12 pp
- LC Class: TX392.C64
- Text: Thirty-nine Reasons Why I Am a Vegetarian at Wikisource

Thirty-nine Reasons Why I Am a Vegetarian is a 1903 publication on vegetarianism by Henry Stephen Clubb, published by the Vegetarian Society of America.

== Publication ==
Printed on twelve pages, Thirty-nine Reasons Why I Am a Vegetarian is thus considered both a "little book," as well as a pamphlet. Initially selling for 10 cents, it was sold as a paperback with a height of 16 centimetres (6.3 in). Preceding the body of text in which Clubb lists his thirty-nine reasons for a vegetarian lifestyle, the publication serves as a portrait of the author. The list is followed by the section "Historical," which in brief gives an account for historical and modern advocation of vegetarianism, a precursor to Clubb's intention to write a much larger history of vegetarianism. Clubb, who was president of the Vegetarian Society of America, published Thirty-nine Reasons Why I Am a Vegetarian in 1903, at 1023 Foulkrod Street, Frankford Station, Philadelphia. It was entered in the Library of Congress on September 8, 1903.

It was one of several pamphlets published by The Vegetarian society of America which Clubb authored on the subject of vegetarianism, including Unpolished rice among others.

== Content ==
Among the reasons Clubb gives for a vegetarian lifestyle are that he is "an optimist" and that "eating a lamb does not make a man lamb-like in his character any more than eating a missionary converts a savage into a Christian," which contributors to Unity found "interesting." Though not stated in Thirty-nine Reasons Why I Am a Vegetarian, Clubb has been quoted as saying meat-eating "tends to excite anger, to bring out the brutal, and weaken the gentle and kindly traits."

Clubb quotes William Axon in the section "Historical" citing part of a hymn:

Bright creatures of the air and earth
We seek not to destroy,
But share with them the gifts of life,
Of duty and of joy.

Additionally, he mentions other contemporaries, such as Wesley, Swedenborg, Linneas, Graham, Alcott, Trail, and Kellogg. He also writes of the importance of the entrepreneurship of health food advocates like Ferdinand Schumacher, a vegetarian who had recently merged with three "manufactories" to form Quaker Oats Company. Clubb concludes his publication writing "the odor of flesh and fish is becoming intolerable to the advancing refinement of intelligent and progressive people who know how sweet and joyful are the homes that are free from it."

Clubb lived to the age of 95, which has been attributed to his vegetarian diet.

== Sources ==
- Clubb, Henry Stephen (1903). Thirty-nine reasons why I am a vegetarian . Philadelphia: The Vegetarian Society of America – via Wikisource.
- Good health. Vol. 40. Good Health Pub. Co. 1905.
- The Phrenological Journal and Science of Health: Incorporated with the Phrenological Magazine. Vol. 118. Fowler & Wells. 1905.
- Publishers Weekly. Vol. 67. F. Leypoldt. 1905.
- Roberts, Nancy L. (1991). American peace writers, editors, and periodicals. Greenwood Press. ISBN 9780313268427. OCLC 603722014.
- Unity. Vol. 26. Unity Tract Society, Unity School of Christianity. 1907.
- The Vegetarian Magazine. Vol. 14. Chicago Vegetarian Society. 1910.
