= C. H. Worsnop =

English businessman and inventor

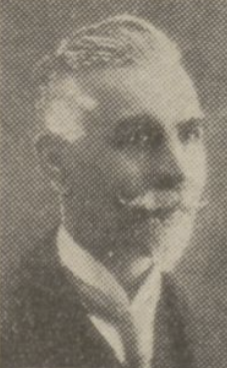
- Born: Charles Henry Worsnop; 1862
- Died: 21 January 1939; Halifax, West Yorkshire
- Occupation: Businessman

Charles Henry Worsnop (1862 – 21 January 1939) was an English businessman, inventor and vegetarianism activist.

== Career ==
Worsnop founded Worsnop and Co at Halifax, West Yorkshire in 1860. His company manufactured lamps and was one of the first to sell alkaline batteries in England. The company was renamed Alklum Electrics and remained in operation until 1925. In 1932, he founded Alklum Storage Batteries. He also managed Worsnop & Sons with his son Alfred. Worsnop was the inventor of the nickel steel electric battery.

In 1890, there was a fatal gas explosion at the premise of Worsnop's electro-plate works, killing several people, including his brother John. An inquiry concluded that the gas explosion was accidental but there was insufficient evidence to know how it was caused.

== Vegetarianism ==
Worsnop became a vegetarian as a young man after reading the booklet Pork and its Perils. He joined the Vegetarian Society in 1886 and was president of Halifax Vegetarian and Food Reform Society from 1894 to 1895. He attended the 1896 annual meeting of the Vegetarian Federal Union.

== Personal life ==
Worsnop had three brothers. His brother Frank a veterinary surgeon died in 1926. Worsnop died at his home in Rockville, Halifax in 1939, aged 78. He was buried at Stoney Royd Cemetery.
