= R. E. O'Callaghan =

English social reformer and writer (1855–1936)

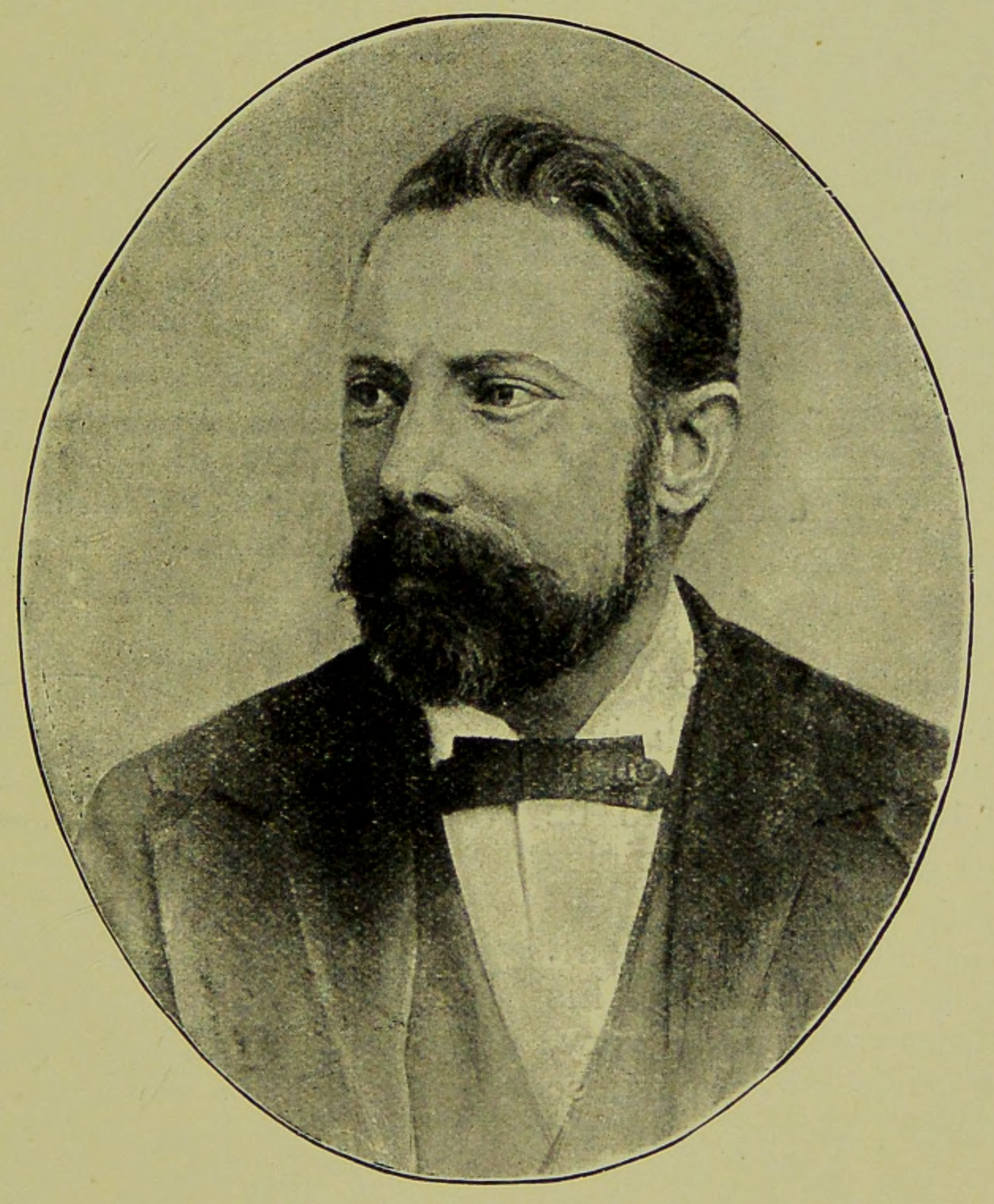
- O'Callaghan in Fifty Years of Food Reform (1898)
- Born: Robert Elliott O'Callaghan; 1855; St Pancras, Middlesex, England
- Died: 21 December 1936 (aged 81); Longsight, Manchester, England
- Resting place: Southern Cemetery, Manchester
- Occupations: Social reformer; writer
- Known for: Vegetarianism, anti-vivisection, and humanitarian activism
- Spouse: Mary Ann Barry (m. 1888)
- Children: 1

Robert Elliott O'Callaghan (1855 – 21 December 1936) was an English social reformer and writer. He was involved in the vegetarian movement from the 1880s, serving as official lecturer for the Vegetarian Association, secretary of the London Vegetarian Society, and inaugural secretary of the Vegetarian Federal Union. He was also involved in anti-vivisection and humanitarian causes, founded the Catholic Humane League in 1900, and was a member of the Humanitarian League.

O'Callaghan became interested in vegetarianism after reading a report of a lecture by Francis William Newman. He lectured on vegetarianism, often using magic lantern slides, and later became proprietor of the Wheat Sheaf vegetarian restaurant in London. His publications included The Best Diet for a Working Man and The Manual of Vegetarianism.

== Biography ==
=== Early life ===
Robert Elliott O'Callaghan was born in St Pancras, Middlesex, in the final quarter of 1855. He was of Irish Catholic descent.

=== Vegetarian activism ===
O'Callaghan's interest in vegetarianism began after he saw a report of one of Francis William Newman's lectures in a shop window. In 1880, he joined the London Food Reform Society and the following year became a member of its executive committee. He became a lecturer on vegetarianism and often illustrated his talks with magic lantern slides.

O'Callaghan served as official lecturer for the Vegetarian Association, secretary of the London Vegetarian Society (LVS), and, from 1890, inaugural secretary of the Vegetarian Federal Union (VFU). He later acted as the VFU's agent for the Southern Counties.

At a vegetarian meeting in Halifax in 1893, chaired by C. H. Worsnop, O'Callaghan argued that a vegetarian diet was more nourishing than meat eating and that vegetarian cookery was simple and economical.

In an 1898 interview in The Vegetarian, O'Callaghan said that vegetarian advocacy in the south-western counties was difficult because the area was largely agricultural, conservative, and connected with cattle, wool, leather, and related trades. He described vegetarian groups in the district as small and scattered, and said that educated middle-class and professional audiences were generally the most receptive to vegetarian arguments.

He later became proprietor of the Wheat Sheaf, a vegetarian restaurant at 13 Rathbone Place, Oxford Street, succeeding Mrs. Britton.

=== Humanitarian and anti-vivisection work ===
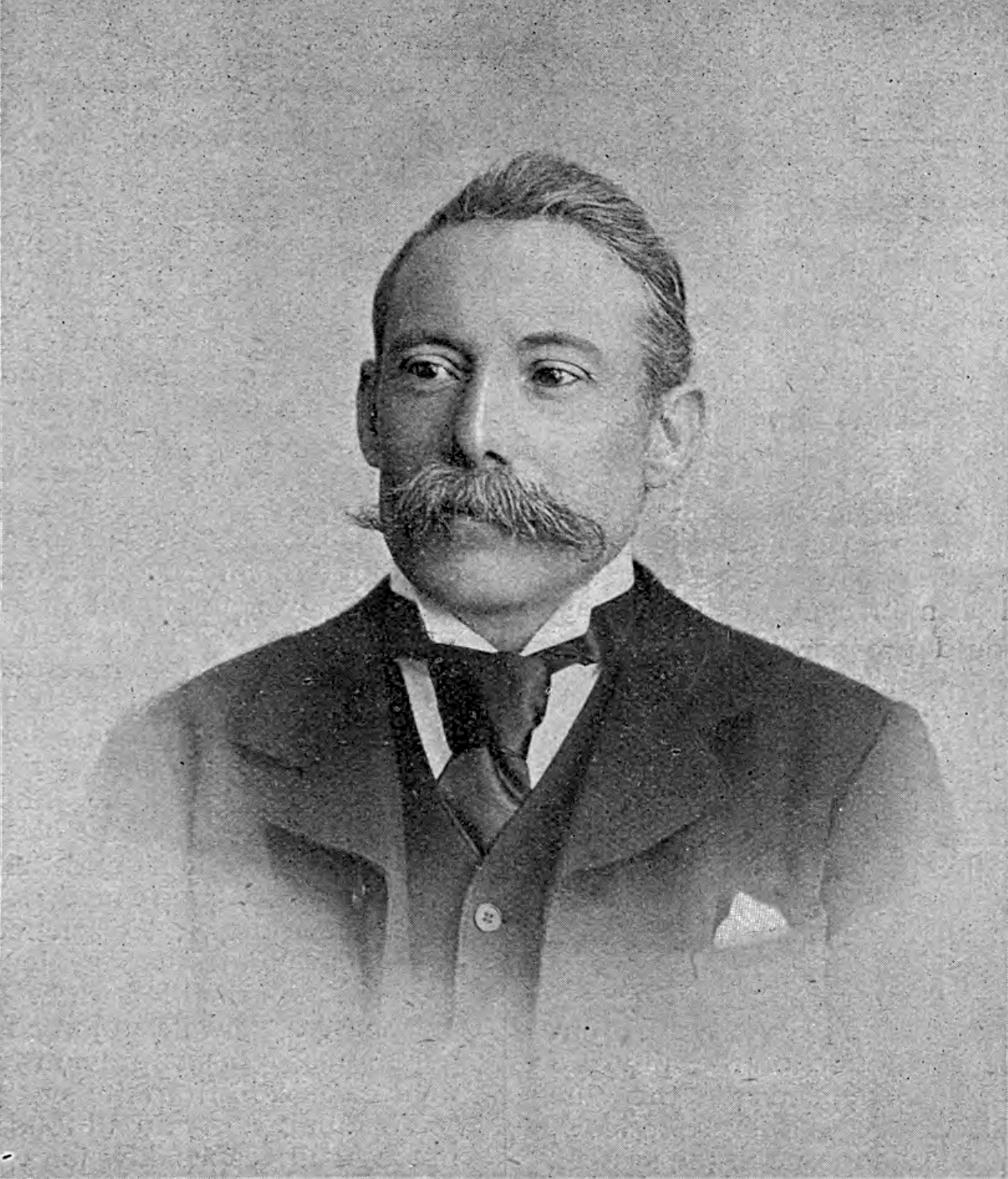
O'Callaghan, c. 1898

On the formation of the Humanitarian League in 1891, O'Callaghan served on its provisional committee.

In 1900, O'Callaghan founded the Catholic Humane League to promote humane principles among Catholics in accordance with Church teaching. He served as its honorary secretary.

By 1908, O'Callaghan was involved in the anti-vivisection movement. At Heywood, he gave an address on the movement and a lecture titled "Vivisection in Our Hospitals". He later served as secretary of the Northern Anti-Vivisection Federation and was associated with the Stockport Anti-Vivisection Society and the British Union for the Abolition of Vivisection.

=== Writings ===
In 1889, O'Callaghan published The Best Diet for a Working Man. The following year, he co-authored, with Charles W. Forward, The Manual of Vegetarianism: A Complete Guide to Food Reform. This was followed by How to Begin Vegetarianism with Month's Dietary and Cookery Book. He also published the pamphlet The Testimony of Science Against Flesh Eating and contributed the short story "The Ghost", about an ex-soldier who refuses to harm animals, to Forward's Dulce Sodalitium: A Selection of Stories and Sketches by Vegetarian Writers.

=== Personal life and death ===
In 1888, O'Callaghan married Mary Ann Barry in Fulham. They had one daughter, Florence.

By 1911, O'Callaghan was recorded as living in Manchester with his family.

O'Callaghan died at Longsight, Manchester, on 21 December 1936, aged 81. He was buried on 24 December at Southern Cemetery.

== Publications ==
- Hints to Beginners. London: London Vegetarian Society.
- The Best Diet for a Working Man. London: London Vegetarian Society. 1889. OCLC 266967686.
- Forward, Charles W. (1890). The Manual of Vegetarianism: A Complete Guide to Food Reform. London: Hygienic Publishing Union. OCLC 561996761.
- How to Begin Vegetarianism with Month's Dietary and Cookery Book. London: London Vegetarian Society. 1897. OCLC 316664483.
- The Testimony of Science Against Flesh Eating. Order of the Golden Age.

== See also ==
- History of vegetarianism
- Vegetarianism in the Victorian era
