= London Vegetarian Society =

British vegetarian organisation (1888–1969)

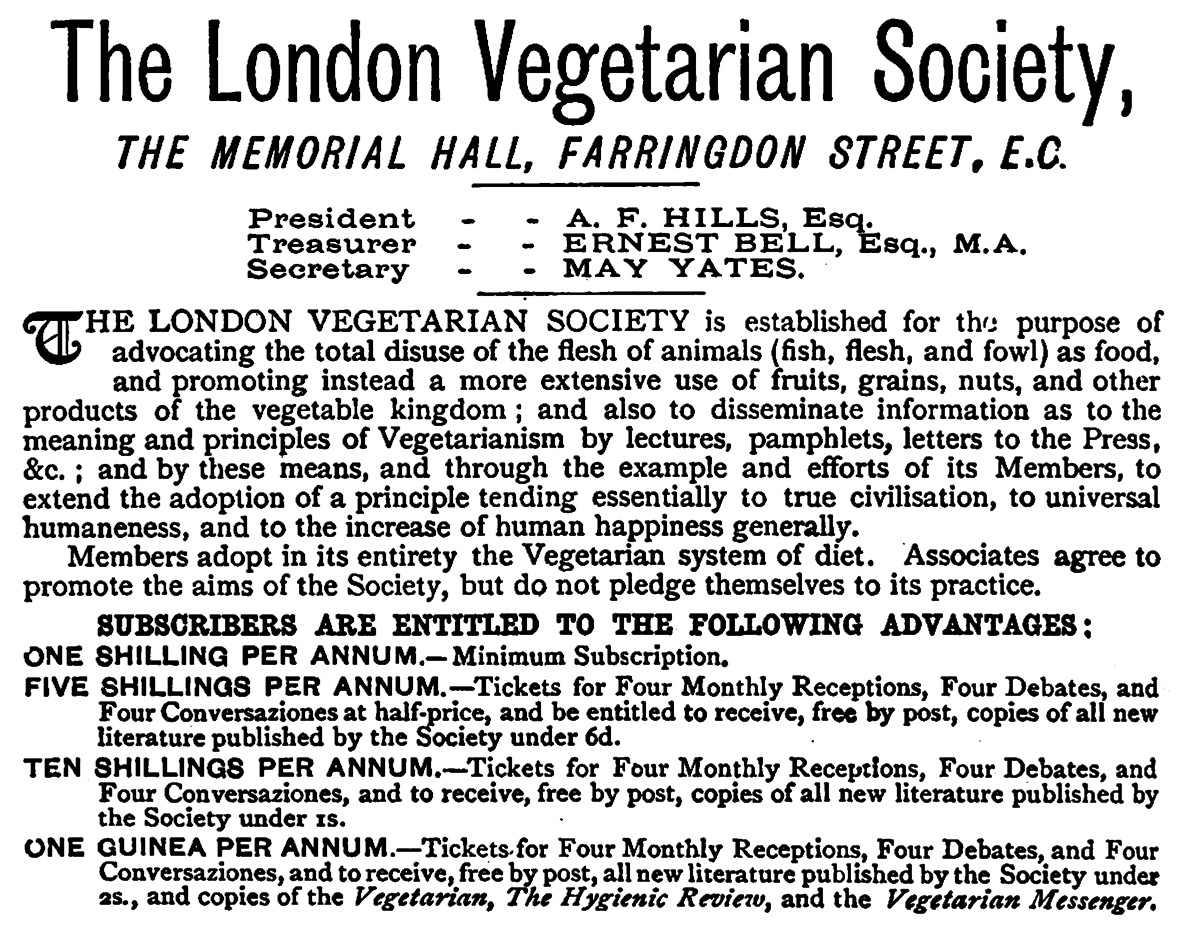
- London Vegetarian Society notice, 1891
- Abbreviation: LVS
- Predecessor: London branch of the Vegetarian Society
- Successor: Vegetarian Society of the United Kingdom
- Formation: 1888; 138 years ago
- Dissolved: 1969; 57 years ago
- Type: Vegetarian organisation
- Headquarters: Memorial Hall, Farringdon Street, London; 8 John Street, Adelphi, London; 6 Duke Street, Adelphi, London; 17 John Adam Street, Adelphi, London
- Region served: United Kingdom
- Presidents: Arnold Hills (from 1888); J. B. S. Watson; Charlotte Despard (from 1918); Bertrand P. Allinson (1922–1962); James Horsley (1962–1965); Cyril H. Oliver (1966–1969)
- Main organ: The Vegetarian (1888–1921); Vegetarian News (1921–1958); The British Vegetarian (1958–1969; with the Manchester Vegetarian Society)
- Affiliations: Vegetarian Federal Union; London Vegetarian Association

The London Vegetarian Society (LVS) was a British vegetarian organisation that existed from 1888 to 1969. It was formed after the London branch of the Vegetarian Society separated from the Manchester-based society amid disagreement over the status of the London branch. Its first president was Arnold Hills, and its members included Thomas Allinson, Josiah Oldfield and Mahatma Gandhi.

The society promoted vegetarianism through lectures, pamphlets, meetings and periodicals. Hills founded The Vegetarian in 1888. The LVS initiated the Vegetarian Federal Union in 1889, and was also connected with the London Vegetarian Association, a local union of London vegetarian societies formed in 1895.

The LVS took part in International Vegetarian Union congresses and co-organised the 1926 World Vegetarian Congress in London with the Manchester-based Vegetarian Society. During the Second World War, it was involved in rationing discussions through the Committee of Vegetarian Interests. In 1969, the London and Manchester societies amalgamated to form the Vegetarian Society of the United Kingdom.

== Background ==
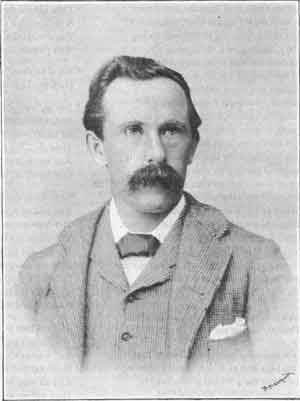
Arnold Hills, the society's first president, in 1889

The Vegetarian Society was founded in 1847 and was based in Manchester. Francis William Newman was its president from 1873 to 1884. Under Newman, the society admitted associate members and avoided linking vegetarianism with other reform causes, such as abstinence from alcohol and tobacco.

In London, the Dietetic Reform Society was formed in 1875 and was based at the Memorial Hall, Farringdon Street. Its members abstained from alcohol and tobacco as well as meat. The London Food Reform Society followed in 1877. The organisation later became the National Food Reform Society and merged with the Vegetarian Society in 1885, after which it became the Vegetarian Society's London branch.

Colin Spencer states that relations between the London and Manchester groups became strained in the 1880s. According to Spencer, the London group wanted to operate as a national reforming society, while the Manchester-based society regarded London as a branch of the central organisation.

== Formation and early work ==
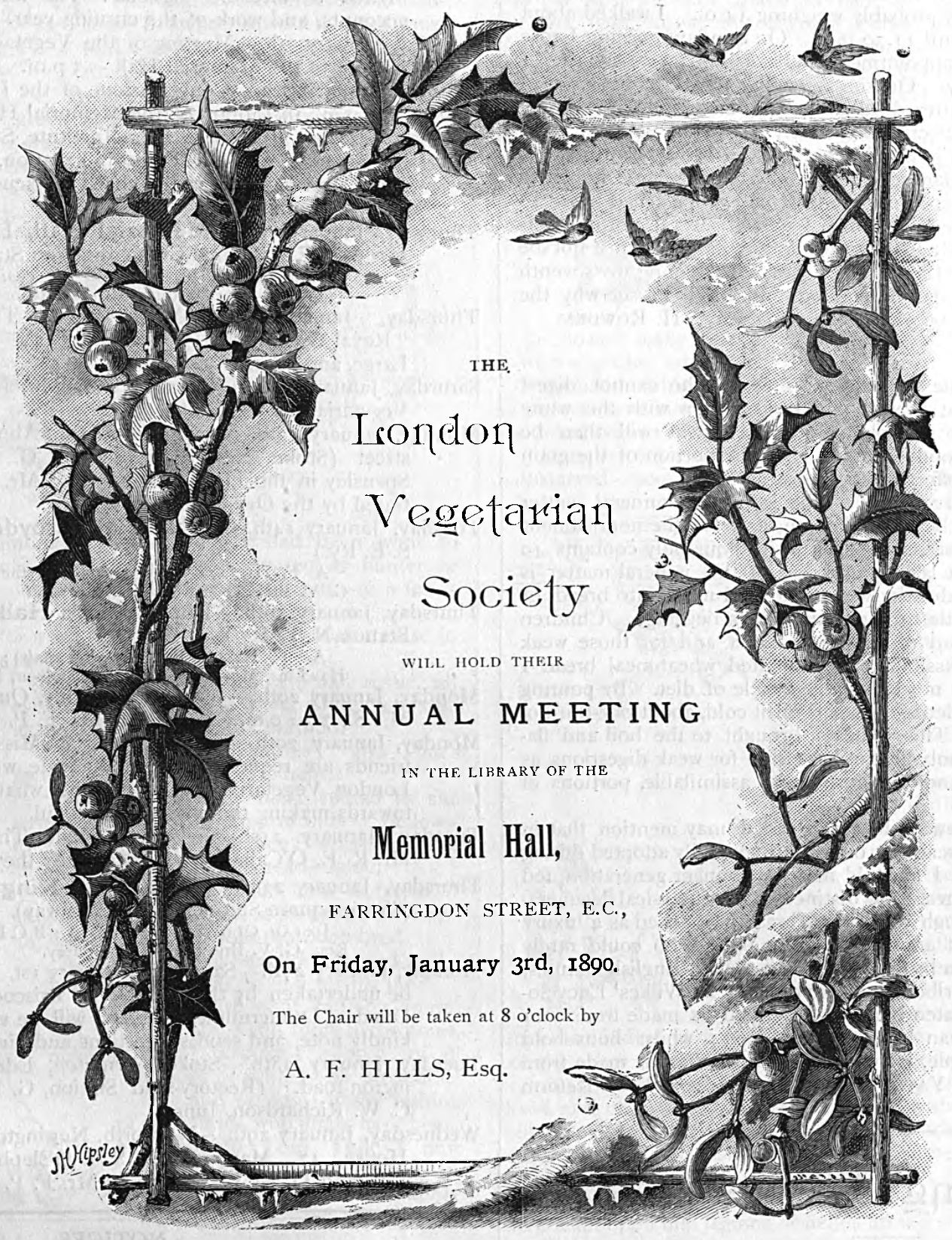
Notice for the LVS's 1890 annual meeting at Memorial Hall

In 1888, the London group separated from the original society and formed the London Vegetarian Society.

Charles W. Forward later wrote that Arnold Hills had tried to reduce divisions among London vegetarians. According to Forward, a proposal for a "fusion of forces in the Metropolis" led to a meeting at 18 St Bride Street on 13 March 1888. An amended basis of agreement was signed by Hills, Forward, Ernest Bell, H. Phillips, W. L. Beurle, F. Trier, R. Gill, S. A. M. Farnworth, S. Young, J. Hayward, and C. L. H. Wallace.

After the Manchester executive rejected the proposal, the London Vegetarian Society was formed as a separate body in place of the London Auxiliary. Hills was elected president, R. E. O'Callaghan was appointed secretary, and a committee was formed. Forward wrote that offices were taken at Memorial Hall on Hills's responsibility, and that the society began a campaign under his leadership. Richard McIlwain states that the LVS was funded by Hills, and that its members included Mahatma Gandhi, Thomas Allinson, and Josiah Oldfield.

A contemporary notice stated that the society's purpose was to advocate "the total disuse of the flesh of animals (fish, flesh, and fowl) as food" and to promote the use of "fruits, grains, nuts, and other products of the vegetable kingdom". It also stated that the society used lectures, pamphlets and letters to the press to circulate information about vegetarianism.

On 1 October 1889, the LVS initiated the Vegetarian Federal Union, which was based in the same offices and had personnel in common with the society. According to John Davis, the London Vegetarian Association (LVA) was created in 1895 as a local union of vegetarian societies in London districts. Davis states that the LVS, the LVA, the Vegetarian Federal Union shared overlapping leadership and offices, which caused confusion among members.

By the end of the 1890s, the LVS recorded about 700 members and associates. James Gregory states that this total included some members from outside London, while also omitting some London vegetarians because relatives in member households were not always listed separately. The society's annual income was nearly £1,400 in 1890, but had fallen to about £800 by 1898; £650 of the latter amount came from Hills.

== Gandhi and the society ==
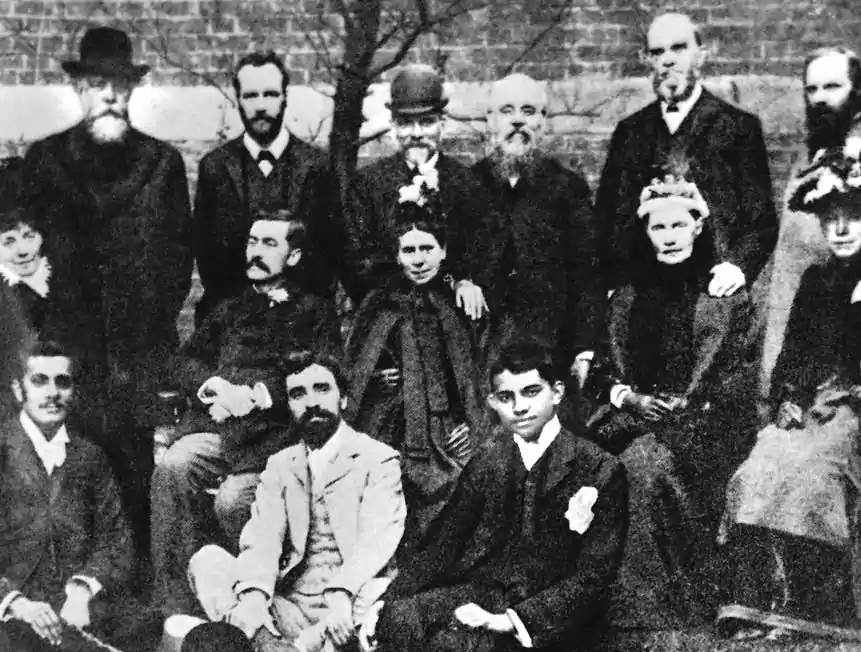
LVS members at Portsmouth, May 1891; Gandhi is seated in the front row, third from left

Gandhi lived in London from 1888 to 1891 while studying law. In his autobiography, he wrote that he joined an English vegetarian society, subscribed to its journal, and was elected to its executive committee. The International Vegetarian Union identifies this society as the London Vegetarian Society. Gandhi also started a short-lived vegetarian club in Bayswater, with Oldfield as president, Edwin Arnold as vice-president, and himself as secretary.

Gandhi later recalled a committee dispute over Allinson, who advocated birth control. Hills sought Allinson's removal from the society on moral grounds. Gandhi wrote that he disagreed with Allinson's views on birth control, but opposed excluding him from a vegetarian society for views unrelated to vegetarianism. Allinson lost the vote, and Gandhi recalled that he may have resigned from the committee after the incident.

Gandhi addressed a social meeting organised by the society on 20 November 1931, where he delivered the speech later published as "The Moral Basis of Vegetarianism".

== International congresses ==
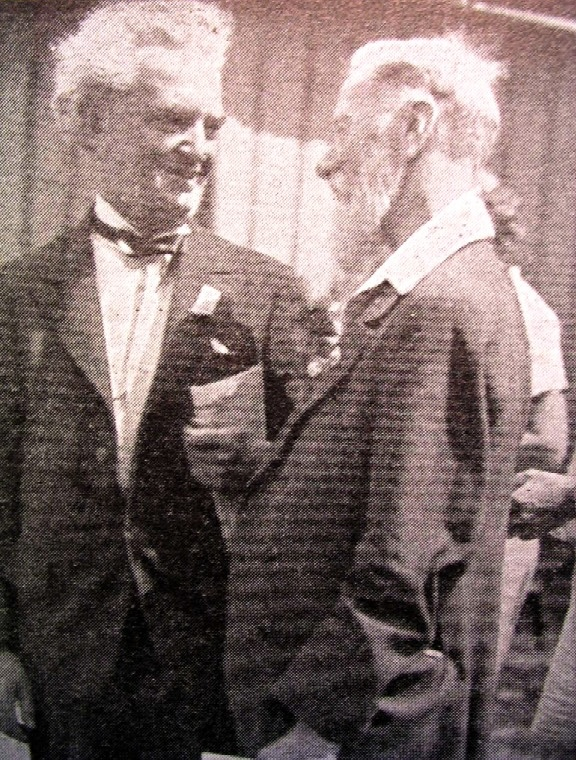
Frank Wyatt, the society's secretary, with B. O. Dürr at the 1932 IVU Congress

The society was involved with the International Vegetarian Union from its early congresses. Its secretary, Florence I. Nicholson, sent a letter of support to the first IVU Congress in Dresden in 1908 after being unable to attend. The London society was represented at the 1909 congress in Manchester, where Nicholson reported on vegetarian feeding for poor children in London. Hills was named as a member of honour of the committee for the 1910 congress in Brussels.

At the 1923 congress in Stockholm, the society was represented by Charles W. Forward, who presented a paper on "Vegetarianism and its Basis of Scientific Truth", and by Frank Wyatt, who gave a report for the LVS. The 1926 World Vegetarian Congress was held in London and was organised jointly by the LVS and the Manchester-based Vegetarian Society.

At the 1929 congress in Steinschonau, Czechoslovakia, the London and Manchester societies each sent two delegates. The British delegates presented a joint national report, and all four delegates were members of both societies. Wyatt, the London secretary, chaired a session at the 1932 IVU Congress in Berlin and Hamburg and was later elected to the IVU committee.

== Later years and merger ==
By 1912, the Rev. J. B. S. Watson was president of the LVS. Charlotte Despard became president in 1918 and was a vice-president by 1931. Dr Bertrand P. Allinson was president from 1922 to 1962. He was succeeded by James Horsley, who had served as vice-president for several years. Following Horsley's death in 1965, Cyril H. Oliver served as president from 1966 to 1969.

By 1916, the society was based at 8 John Street, Adelphi, London. During the Second World War, the society's offices at 6 Duke Street, Adelphi, were destroyed by German bombing on 10 October 1940. Frank Wyatt, then secretary of the society, was injured while working there. By 1941, the society was based at 17 John Adam Street, Adelphi. In 1941, it issued the leaflet War-Time Food Problems, which argued for a diet free from meat during wartime and stated that copies were available for free distribution. Representatives of the London and Manchester societies took part in the Committee of Vegetarian Interests, which liaised with the Ministry of Food over rationing. Vegetarians were allowed an extra ration of cheese, and the committee also dealt with the distribution of nuts and questions about who qualified as a vegetarian.

At the 1947 IVU Congress in Stonehouse, Gloucestershire, the congress noted the death during the war of Wyatt. Roy Walker, then secretary of the London society, was among the speakers. The final assembly of the congress was held in London as guests of the committee and officers of the LVS.

The London and Manchester societies worked more closely during the 1950s and 1960s. The society was registered as a charity on 17 May 1962. Its governing document stated that it had been established in 1888, with rules approved on 15 April 1961, and gave its area of benefit as "London and national". In 1969, the two societies amalgamated to form the Vegetarian Society of the United Kingdom.

== Publications ==
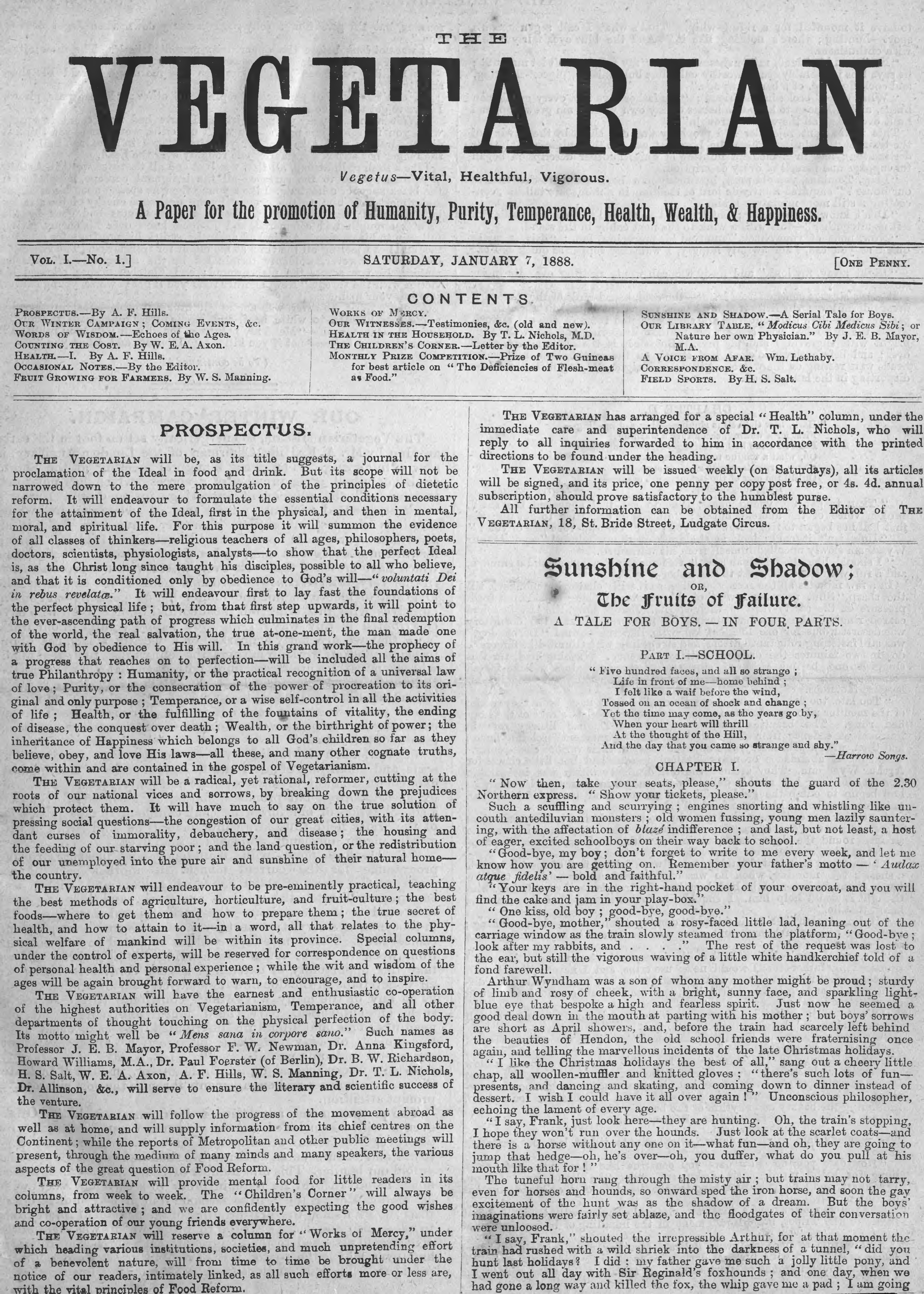
First page of the first issue of The Vegetarian

=== The Vegetarian ===
Hills founded and owned The Vegetarian, a weekly periodical first issued in January 1888. It was subtitled "A Paper for the Promotion of Humanity, Purity, Temperance, Health, Wealth, and Happiness". It was described in The Vegetarian Messenger as independent of the LVS, which was not responsible for its appearance. It was published weekly and edited by Josiah Oldfield.

By 1914 The Vegetarian, was published as the "Organ of the London Vegetarian Association".

The Vegetarian became The Vegetarian News in 1921. In 1958, it was merged with The Vegetarian, the magazine of the Manchester society, to form The British Vegetarian.

=== Leaflets and pamphlets ===
The society published the following pamphlets:

- A. M. L. The Band of Love.
- A. S. H. Fruit in Daily Use.
- Blatch, Margaret (1902). Bell, Ernest (ed.). Conservative Cookery.
- Densmore, Dr. The Curative Action of Regimen.
- Drakoules, Alice (1892). Humanity and Vegetarianism, Being a Paper Read Before the Vegetarian Federal Union.
- Evans, T. H. Temperance and Vegetarianism.
- Forward, Charles W. Cows' Milk as a Cause of Disease.
- Forward, Charles W. Value of Fats and Oils.
- A Horrible Trade.
- Hills, A. F. A Vegetarian Dietary.
- Hills, A. F. Life.
- Hills, A. F. Popular Fallacies.
- Hills, A. F. Principles and Practice.
- Hills, A. F. Vegetarianism.
- Hills, A. F. Vital Food!.
- Lewis, A. M. Humanity and Vegetarianism: Being a Paper Read Before the Vegetarian Federal Union, 1892.
- Manning, W. S. The Ideal in Food.
- Nichols, T. L. How to Live on Sixpence a Day.
- O'Callaghan, R. E. Hints to Beginners.
- O'Callaghan, R. E. (1889). The Best Diet for a Working Man.
- Oldfield, Josiah. A Word for All!.
- Oldfield, Josiah (1892). The Cost of Living.
- Oldfield, Josiah (1892). The Ideal Diet in Relation to Life.
- Oldfield, Josiah (1892). The Influenza.
- Oldfield, Josiah (1893). Longevity.
- The Penny Vegetarian Cookery.
- Rules of the London Vegetarian Society.
- Salt, H. S. Popular Fallacies; or, Answers to Objections.
- Science.
- War-Time Food Problems. 1941.
- Wood, J. Newton. Vegetarianism and the Soul.
- Wheatmeal Bread.

=== Books ===
- Salt, Henry S. (1933). The Logic of Vegetarianism. Revised and abridged.

== See also ==
- History of vegetarianism
- Vegetarianism in the Victorian era
- Mahatma Gandhi and vegetarianism
