= Gap Road Cemetery =

Cemetery in London

Coordinates: 51.4293°N 0.1948°W

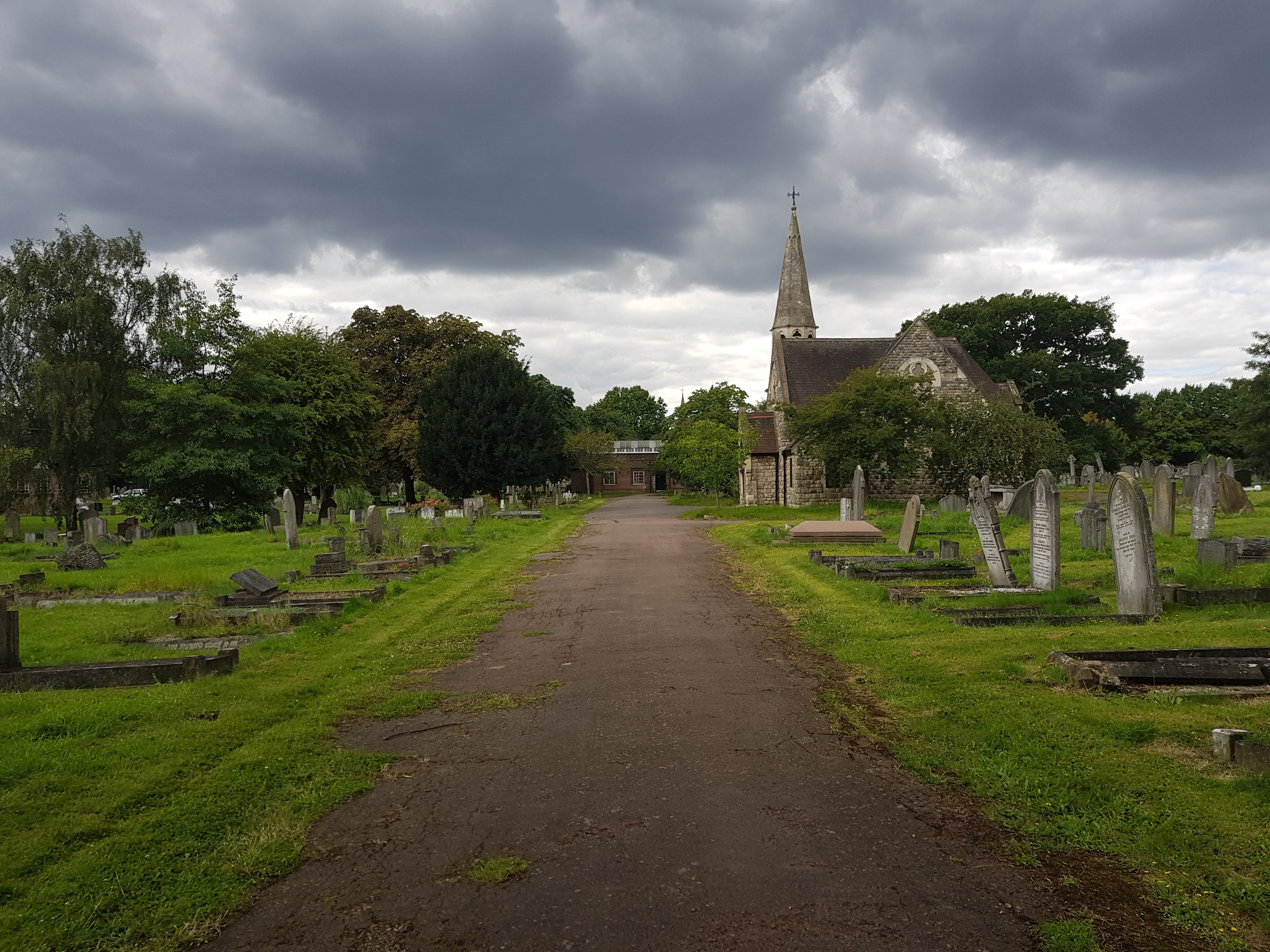
- The Cemetery in 2017

Details
- Established: 1876
- Location: Gap Road, Wimbledon, London
- Country: England
- Size: 20 acres
- Find a Grave: 2199854

Gap Road Cemetery or Wimbledon Cemetery is a cemetery located in Wimbledon, London. 20 acres in size, the cemetery was opened in 1876, and contains three chapels, including two disused historical chapels, one for Church of England services and another for Dissenters (Nonconformists).

== Notable burials ==
Notable burials include:

- Colin Scott-Moncrieff (1836–1916), British engineer, soldier and civil servant
- Imogen Hassall, (1942–1980), English actress

The cemetery also contains the war graves of 127 Commonwealth service personnel from World War I and World War II.
