= Henry S. Clubb =

English-American minister and social reformer (1827–1921)

The Reverend Henry S. Clubb
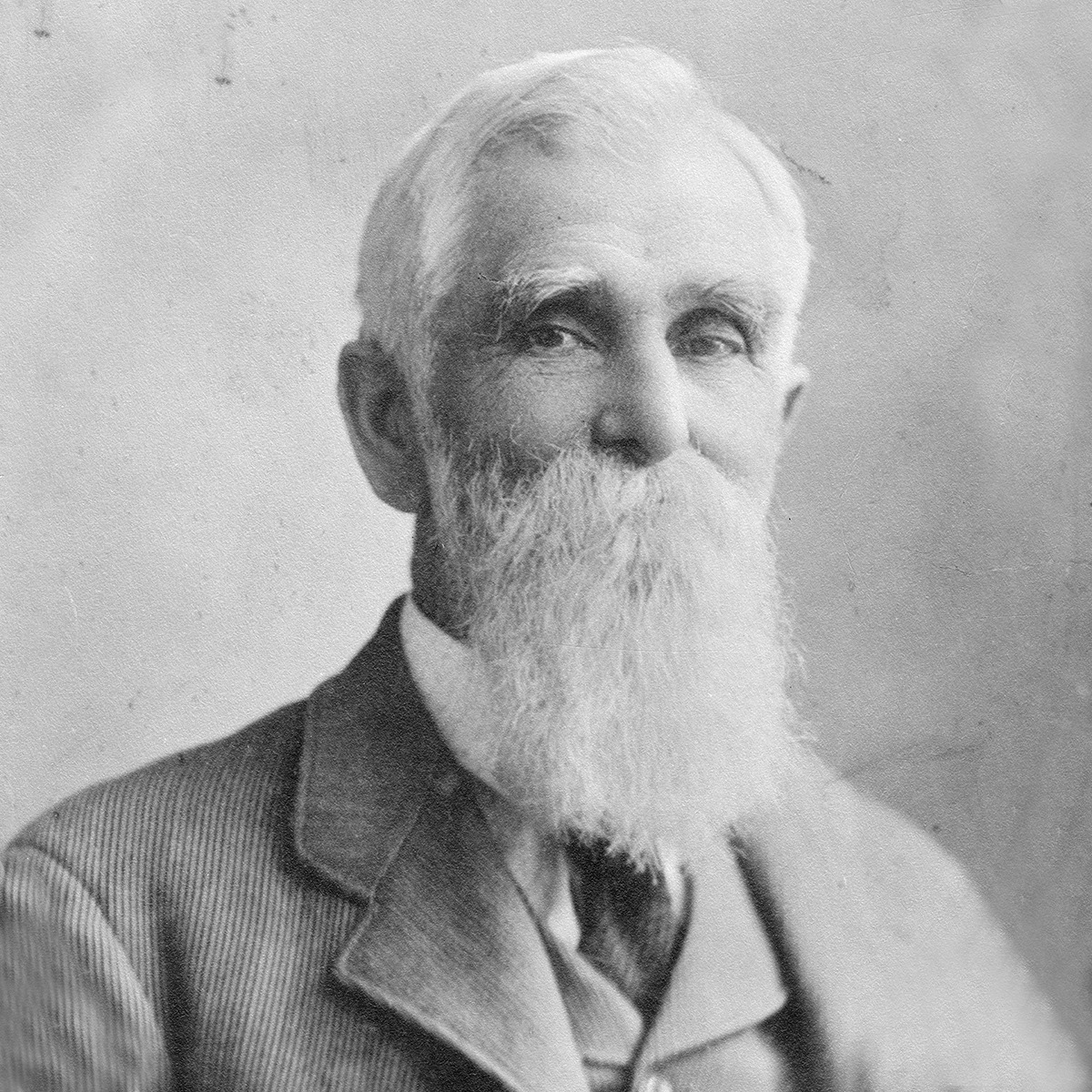
- Born: Henry Stephen Clubb; June 21, 1827; Colchester, Essex, England
- Died: October 29, 1921 (aged 94); Philadelphia, Pennsylvania, U.S.
- Resting place: Oakwood Cemetery, Sharon, Pennsylvania, U.S. 40.0231018°N 75.1007996°W
- Occupations: Minister; social reformer; journalist; writer; politician
- Years active: 1842–c. 1907
- Notable work: Thirty-nine Reasons Why I Am a Vegetarian (1903)
- Spouse: Anne Barbara Henderson (m. 1855; died 1915)
- Children: 3
- Military career
- Allegiance: United States
- Branch: Union Army
- Rank: Quartermaster
- Conflict: American Civil War; Siege of Vicksburg

Henry Stephen Clubb (June 21, 1827 – October 29, 1921) was an English-American Bible Christian minister, social reformer, journalist, writer, and politician. Born in Colchester, England, he was associated with vegetarianism, abolitionism, Chartism and pacifism. After moving to the United States in the 1850s, he worked as a journalist, took part in the attempted settlement of Octagon City, Kansas, and served in the Union Army during the American Civil War. From 1873 to 1874, he represented Michigan's 29th Senate district.

Clubb later founded the Vegetarian Society of America, serving as its first president. He edited and published vegetarian periodicals, helped organise the vegetarian congress at the 1893 World's Columbian Exposition, and wrote on vegetarianism. His best-known work, Thirty-nine Reasons Why I Am a Vegetarian, was published in 1903.

== Biography ==
=== Early life and background ===
Henry Stephen Clubb was born on June 21, 1827, in Colchester, England. He was the youngest of the nine children of Stephen and Elizabeth Clubb. His parents were first Unitarians and later Swedenborgians. They were also vegetarians for a time and were members of the Vegetarian Society, as was his brother Robert. Clubb's education, like that of many English boys of the time, came from several sources, including evening school and study of Cobbett's Grammar and Pitman's phonography until the age of 12.

=== Early activism ===
At the age of 13, Clubb became a clerk at the Colchester post office. While working there, he learned about W. Gibson Ward, a London-based commercial traveller, who spoke of the Concordium, an alternative community later known as Alcott House at Ham Common. Clubb was encouraged to become a vegetarian by Ward's visits to his father's home, where he heard Ward speak about slaughterhouses.

In 1842, at the age of 15, Clubb joined the Concordium. His journey there was via London, his first visit to the capital and his first journey by train. After the dissolution of the community, he remained in London and became proficient in Pitman's shorthand. He first worked as a shorthand teacher before becoming secretary to James Simpson, a leader in the early English vegetarian movement.

In 1850, he joined the Bible Christian Church, a sect founded by William Cowherd. He also became the local secretary of the Vegetarian Society in Salford and wrote for the Vegetarian Advocate newspaper. Around this time, Clubb and his family took part in a shorthand and vegetarian community in Stratford St. Mary (c. 1848–1851), near Colchester.

By 1848, Clubb had joined the Chartist movement. He was involved in bringing together Chartist localities and land plan branches in the region into what became known as the Essex and Suffolk Chartist Union, although his involvement appears to have been brief. The following year, he was elected president of a dietetic class at the Library Institution in Salford and earned a living by lecturing and writing on vegetarianism.

=== Career in the United States ===
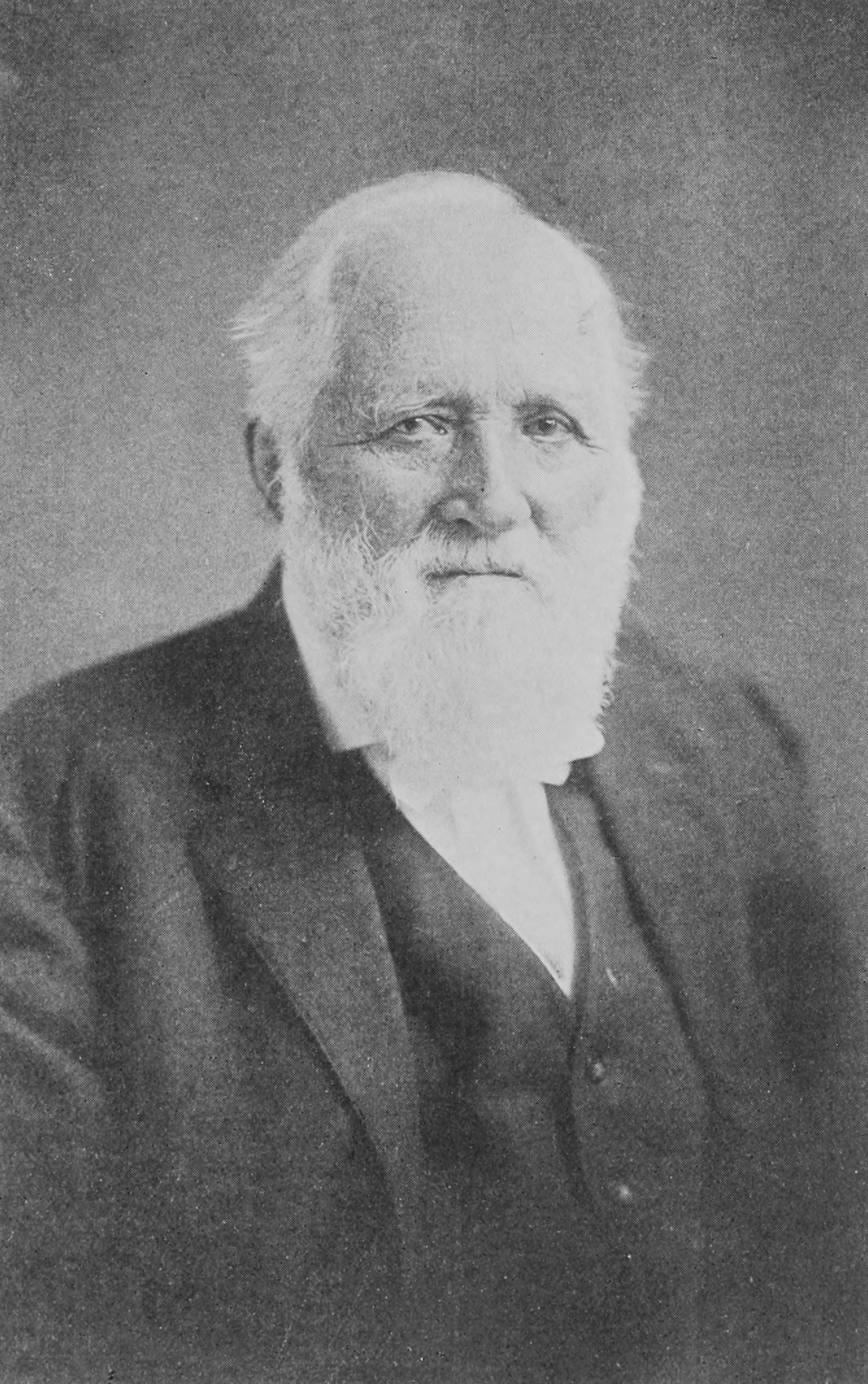
Clubb in his later years

In 1853, Clubb immigrated to the United States and worked as a journalist in New York, where he worked with Charles A. Dana for the New-York Tribune. As an abolitionist and pacifist, he lectured against slavery.

Between 1856 and 1857, he was involved with Charles DeWolfe and John McLaurin in building Octagon City, Kansas. The settlement was first planned as a vegetarian colony, but was later associated with moral reform and the octagonal architectural ideas of Orson Fowler. The project failed because of mosquitoes, malnutrition, grain thefts, and the difficulty of settlement in the area.

In the American Civil War, Clubb served in the Union Army as a quartermaster. He took part in the Siege of Vicksburg, with his wife accompanying him. Clubb was hit by a bullet, but survived because the bullet was slowed when it passed through his pocket, which contained money and his naturalization papers; the papers were destroyed.

While living in Grand Haven, Michigan, Clubb published the Grand Haven Herald newspaper and served as a state senator representing the 29th District from 1873 to 1874. He also served as clerk of the constitutional commission of Michigan and oversaw the printing of the Journal of the Constitutional Commission of Michigan.

=== Vegetarian Society of America ===
Clubb founded the Vegetarian Society of America (VSA) in 1886 and served as its first president. He published a cookbook for the organisation and founded its magazine, Food, Home and Garden. In 1893, Clubb helped organise the International Congress for Vegetarians at the World's Columbian Exposition.

In 1900, the VSA merged with the Chicago Vegetarian Society. The VSA's Food, Home and Garden was later renamed The Vegetarian and Our Fellow Creatures (1901–1903), The Vegetarian Magazine (1903–1925), The Vegetarian Magazine and Fruitarian (1925–1926), and The Vegetarian and Fruitarian (1926–1934).

=== Later life ===
Clubb briefly returned to England in 1901, visiting Salford. He published Thirty-nine Reasons Why I Am a Vegetarian in 1903, setting out his reasons for following a vegetarian diet. In 1907, he decided to write a history of vegetarianism, to be published in the Chicago Vegetarian Magazine.

=== Personal life and death ===
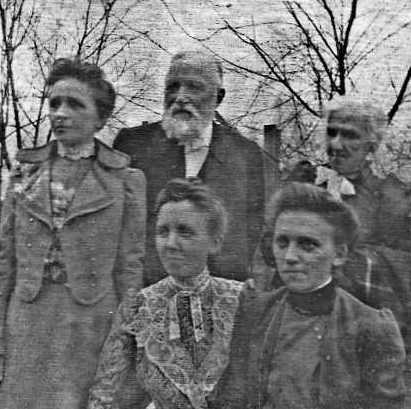
Clubb with his wife and daughters

Clubb married Anne Barbara Henderson on 15 November 1855 in Allegan, Michigan and they had three daughters. His wife died in 1915.

Clubb died in Philadelphia on October 29, 1921, aged 94, from chronic gastritis and dementia. He was buried at Oakwood Cemetery, Sharon, Pennsylvania, with his wife and daughters.

== Selected publications ==
- The Maine Liquor Law: Its Origin, History, and Results, Including a Life of Hon. Neal Dow. 1856.
- Thirty-nine Reasons Why I Am a Vegetarian. 1903.
- Unpolished Rice, the Staple Food of the Orient. 1905.

== See also ==
- Christian vegetarianism
- History of vegetarianism
- Vegetarianism in the Victorian era
- Vegetarianism in the United Kingdom
- Vegetarianism in the United States
- Temperance movement in the United Kingdom
- Temperance movement in the United States
