= Kenneth Romanes =

English translator and activist (1866–1951)

- Born: 13 March 1866; Sydenham, Kent, England
- Died: 3 May 1951 (aged 85); Darmstadt, Hessen, Germany
- Occupations: Translator; writer; activist
- Known for: Co-founding the Humanitarian League
- Spouse: Auguste Marie Flath (m. 1895)
- Relatives: George Romanes (cousin)

Kenneth Romanes (13 March 1866 – 3 May 1951) was an English translator, writer, and vegetarianism activist. He was a founding member of the Humanitarian League, a British advocacy group founded in 1891.

== Biography ==
=== Early life and family ===
Romanes was born on 13 March 1866 in Sydenham, Kent. His parents were John and Hannah Romanes. He was a cousin of the scientist George Romanes.

=== Career ===
In 1886, Romanes joined the Vegetarian Society while working as a patent agent's assistant. In 1891, he was among the founding members of the Humanitarian League, with Henry S. Salt, Howard Williams, Alice Drakoules, and Edward Maitland. His occupation was listed as translator.

Romanes later moved to Germany. He wrote articles for The Vegetarian Messenger on the German vegetarian movement, and also contributed to the German vegetarian journals Vegetarischer Vorwärts ("Vegetarian Forward") and Vegetarische Warte ("Vegetarian Review").

Romanes translated works from German into English, including one book by Heinrich Pudor and two by Louis Kuhne. He was also described in the press as an advocate of naturism.

=== Personal life and death ===
On 13 March 1895, Romanes married Auguste Marie Flath in Berlin. He died in Darmstadt, Hessen, on 3 May 1951.

== Translations ==
- Pudor, Heinrich (1894). Naked People: A Triumph-Shout of the Future.
- Kuhne, Louis (1901). The New Science of Healing.
- Kuhne, Louis (1902). Hand-Book of the Science of Facial Expression or the New System of Diagnosis.
