= Alice Drakoules =

British social reformer (c. 1850–1933)

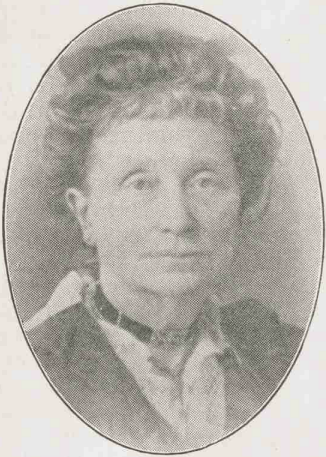
- Drakoules, from the May 1934 issue of Cruel Sports
- Born: Alice Marie Lambe c. 1850; Brussels, Belgium
- Died: 15 January 1933 (aged 83); Regent's Park, London, England
- Resting place: Kensal Green Cemetery
- Other name: Alice Marie Lewis
- Citizenship: British
- Occupations: Social reformer; humanitarian; writer
- Years active: 1886–1933
- Organizations: Vegetarian Society; Band of Mercy; Humanitarian League; Animal Defence and Anti-Vivisection Society; League for the Prohibition of Cruel Sports
- Known for: Animal welfare, anti-vivisection and vegetarianism advocacy
- Spouses: William Burrowes Lewis (m. 1876; died 1906) Platon Drakoules (m. 1907)
- Children: 1 (adopted)

Alice Marie Drakoules (Note: Greek: Δρακούλης; /drəˈkuːliːz/ drə-KOO-leez) (née Lambe; other married name Lewis; c. 1850 – 15 January 1933) was a British social reformer, humanitarian, and writer. She worked in animal welfare, anti-vivisection, and vegetarianism campaigns. Around 1887 she founded a Band of Mercy, and in 1891 she helped found the Humanitarian League, serving as its honorary treasurer until the organisation dissolved in 1919. She was also associated with the Vegetarian Society, the Animal Defence and Anti-Vivisection Society, and the League for the Prohibition of Cruel Sports.

Drakoules published in The Women's Penny Paper and The Vegetarian, including the essays "The Rights of the Non-Human Races" (1889) and "The Ethics of Diet" (1892). She also published the pamphlet Humanity and Vegetarianism in 1892. Her writings criticised meat production and vivisection, and connected moral reform, including women's emancipation, with "pity and mercy". With her second husband, the Greek reformer Platon Drakoules, she promoted humanitarian and dietary reform in southern Europe and represented Greece at the third World Vegetarian Congress in 1910. Historian Hilda Kean describes her as a "spiritual mother" of the British humanitarian movement. She was later commemorated with a memorial birdbath in St John's Wood churchyard.

== Biography ==
=== Early life ===
Drakoules was born Alice Marie Lambe in Brussels, Belgium, around 1850. She was the only child of Henry Lambe of Truro, Cornwall, who held a B.A. from Corpus Christi College, Cambridge; (Note: James Gregory identifies Lambe as having graduated from the University of Oxford. However, contemporary newspapers state he attended the University of Cambridge.) he died in Brussels in 1851, aged 29. Drakoules spent much of her early life in Cornwall.

=== Career ===
==== Vegetarian advocacy ====
According to Hilda Kean, Drakoules was a lifelong vegetarian, though James Gregory states that she first began to examine vegetarian ideas around 1884 and joined the Vegetarian Society as an associate member in 1886.

In 1888, James Burns, a spiritualist and social reformer, launched his "Threefold Food" programme, linking diet reform with spiritual and moral improvement. Soon afterwards, he announced the Progressive Food and Cooking Society, which he credited as being inspired in part by Drakoules.

Drakoules sent placards on "Kindness to Animals" to the society, alongside contributions from spiritualists and vegetarians including Frances L. Boult and the Quaker Ellen Impey. Burns later credited her with inspiring his East End Food Depot and influencing his "Pure Food" campaign.

In 1889, Drakoules supported The Vegetarian's Special Mission Fund, and The Women's Penny Paper reported on her paper on vegetarianism at the Paris Women's Congress. The same year, she contributed an article titled "Vegetarian Dinner in High Life", describing a meatless menu at a fashionable party.

She hosted a meeting of the Vegetarian Rambling Society in 1891 and published "The Ethics of Diet" in The Vegetarian in 1892. That year the London Vegetarian Society published Humanity and Vegetarianism, a paper she read before the Vegetarian Federal Union (VFU) on 26 May 1892. In the paper, she compared the treatment of women and animals as victims of male cruelty. She also wrote that women's participation in the food reform movement was limited, referring to "so few modern feminine advocates of the humaner diet". In 1897, she again addressed the VFU, and her lecture was published as Humanity and Food Reform in 1902.

==== Animal welfare work ====
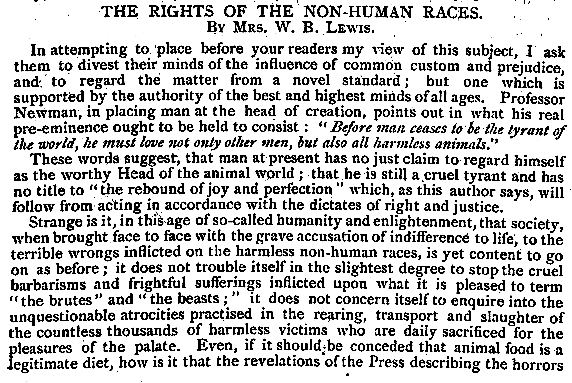
Extract from "The Rights of the Non-Human Races", The Women's Penny Paper, 14 December 1889.

In about 1887, Drakoules founded a Band of Mercy branch in Weybridge, Surrey, a youth movement affiliated with the RSPCA that taught children respect for animals. The branch organised lectures by prominent speakers. Meetings were held in a hall built in the "ancient baronial style" and capable of holding 200 people, which became a venue for reform meetings, including vegetarian gatherings. Drakoules regularly discussed vegetarianism at its meetings.

In 1889, writing on the "Rights of the Non-Human Races" in The Women's Penny Paper, Lewis argued that women's emancipation should be accompanied by "hostility towards deeds of violence" and by "the spread of the instinct of pity and mercy". In the same essay, she denounced meat production, animal transport, and vivisection, and wrote that "man at present has no just claim to regard himself as the worthy Head of the animal world."

Drakoules was a founding member of the executive council of the Animal Defence and Anti-Vivisection Society, founded by Louise Lind af Hageby in 1906. She remained involved with the organisation, supporting its campaigns for municipal slaughterhouses, humane slaughter, and the abolition of performing animals.

Her circle of associates included animal welfare advocates and spiritualists such as Edward Maitland and Anna Kingsford, with whom she shared Theosophical sympathies. She later became part of the circle of Nina Douglas-Hamilton, Duchess of Hamilton and Lind af Hageby, with whom she campaigned for many years. She was also friends with the Scottish humanitarian campaigner Henry B. Amos, who was active in the anti-blood sports and vegetarian movements.

In 1911, her home was used for a meeting to discuss the slaughter of cattle in India for food supplied to British soldiers, with Ernest Bell presiding.

==== Humanitarian League ====
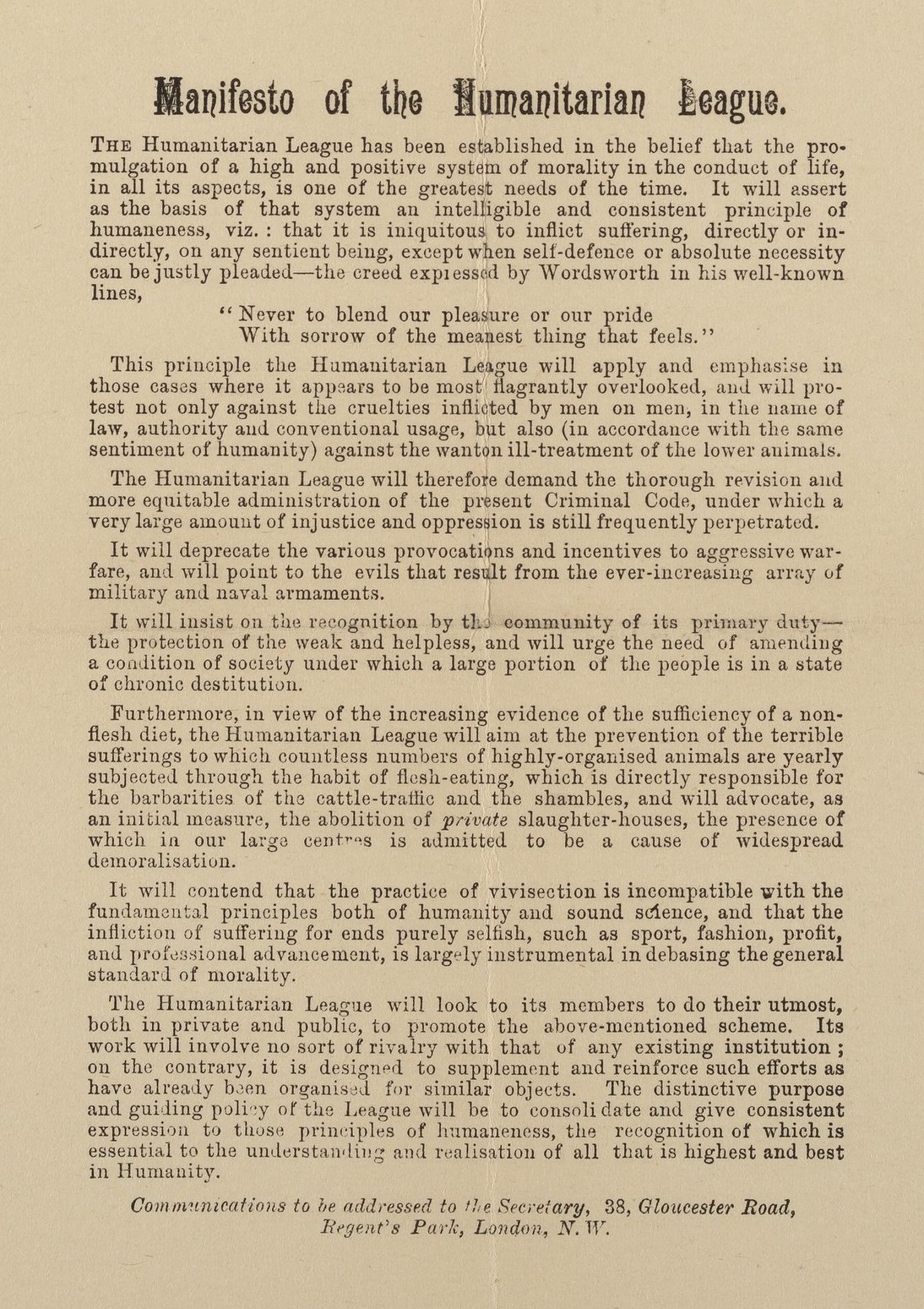
The Humanitarian League's manifesto (1910). Drakoules hosted the League's inaugural meeting at her London home.

In 1891, Drakoules helped establish the Humanitarian League, founded by Henry S. Salt "to prevent the perpetration of cruelty and wrong—to redress the suffering, as far as is possible, of all sentient life". It campaigned for changes to the Poor Laws and criminal justice system, promoted arbitration to resolve international conflicts, opposed blood sports, and sought reforms to legislation on vaccination and vivisection.

The League's first meeting took place at Drakoules's home at 14 Park Square, Regent's Park, London, which also hosted gatherings of reformers and people interested in social and spiritual causes. Her home continued to be used for humanitarian meetings for several decades.

Drakoules contributed mainly through administrative work, overseeing much of the League's day-to-day coordination and remaining on its executive committee for most of its existence. She was honorary treasurer from its foundation until its dissolution in 1919. She was also a member of the League's diet department.

When former members of the League later established the League for the Prohibition of Cruel Sports, Drakoules was among its earliest supporters.

==== International work ====
Her second husband, Platon Drakoules (also spelled Drakoulis), was a Greek sociologist, journalist, and former member of the Greek Parliament. A socialist, he founded the Socialist Labour Movement in Greece and was active in diet and health reform in Athens. He also established the Greek Anti-Carnivore Society and promoted social and humanitarian causes through his writings and lectures.

In 1906, Platon Drakoules helped inaugurate the Athena Hygeia Humane Diet Society in Athens, which promoted humane and vegetarian food reform in Greece. The society developed from a banquet he organised to encourage ethical dietary practices. Alice Drakoules supported the society's work.

Together, the couple promoted vegetarian and animal welfare ideas in southern Europe and the eastern Mediterranean, lecturing on humanitarian subjects in Egypt, Greece, Turkey and Romania. Gregory credits their efforts with helping to found several animal defence societies.

In 1910, Alice Drakoules represented Greece at the third World Vegetarian Congress in Brussels, where she and her husband were commended for their work for vegetarianism and humanitarian reform in Greece and elsewhere.

=== Personal life ===
==== Marriages ====
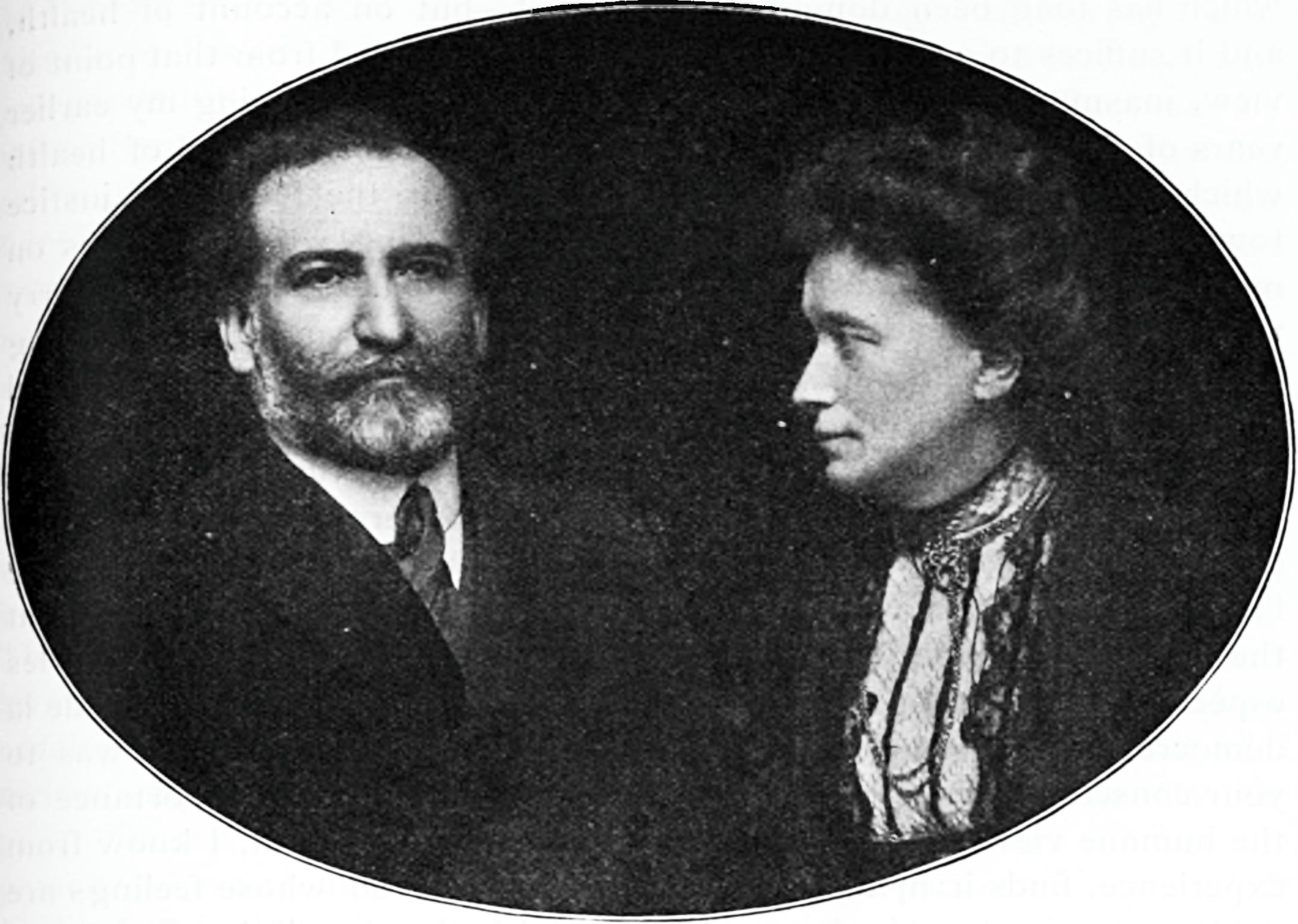
Platon Drakoules and Alice Drakoules, c. 1910

On 18 April 1876, she married William Burrowes Lewis, (Note: His middle name is sometimes spelled Burrows in contemporary sources, but Burrowes appears in legal records such as his will and probate.) of Weybridge, at the parish church of St Grade, Cornwall; he was the managing director of the Union Assurance Company. Lewis died on 1 April 1906, (Note: The Oxford Dictionary of National Biography gives his death year as 1907, but both the National Probate Calendar and FreeBMD indicate he died in 1906.) leaving her with an adopted daughter.

On 9 October 1907, she married Platon Drakoules at her Regent's Park home. He was a Greek reformer with whom she shared an interest in humanitarianism and vegetarianism.

==== Spiritualism ====
In 1887, the spiritualist journal Light reported Drakoules among the members and friends of the London Spiritualist Alliance attending a conversazione at St. James's Hall. In 1911, Light published Platon Drakoules's account of a home demonstration by the American clairvoyant Bert Reese. He stated that the manifestations were genuine, and Alice endorsed this.

=== Death and estate ===
Drakoules died at her home in Regent's Park on 15 January 1933, aged 83. She was buried at Kensal Green Cemetery on 19 January.

Under the terms of her will, Drakoules left an estate valued at £16,061 (equivalent to £993,834 in 2025), with the residue to be distributed after the death of her second husband.

Bequests were made to the London Vegetarian Society, the Manchester Vegetarian Society, the Animal Defence and Anti-Vivisection Society, the National Anti-Vaccination League, the National Canine Defence League, the People's Dispensary for Sick Animals, the National Anti-Vivisection Hospital, and the Not Forgotten Association, as well as to the Metropolitan Public Gardens Association in memory of her first husband.

== Legacy ==
=== Memorials and tributes ===
In 1934, Cruel Sports, the journal of the League for the Prohibition of Cruel Sports, published a tribute by Henry B. Amos. Amos described Drakoules as having spent nearly fifty years in humanitarian and animal welfare work, which she pursued almost until the end of her life. He also announced a memorial fund, supported by figures including Henry S. Salt, Louise Lind af Hageby, Charlotte Despard, and Nina Douglas-Hamilton, Duchess of Hamilton. The fund paid for a birdbath fountain with a trough for dogs near her home in Regent's Park.

A memorial birdbath was installed in 1937 in St John's Wood churchyard, with reliefs of animals connected with the causes she supported. It was unveiled by the Duchess of Hamilton; its inscription reads: "In memory of Alice Marie Drakoules, 1850–1934, for forty years a devoted and generous worker in London for animal welfare, this memorial is erected by her friends, 1937."

=== Historical assessment ===
James Gregory writes that Drakoules's work in the Humanitarian League, together with Henry S. Salt and Josiah Oldfield, was one reason the League included a "humane diet" among its aims. He places her 1892 pamphlet Humanity and Vegetarianism in the late-Victorian overlap between feminist and vegetarian thought, noting that such connections were made by some contemporaries, while the movement produced no tracts directed specifically at women and reported no lectures to female organisations in this period. Hilda Kean describes Drakoules as a "spiritual mother" of the British humanitarian movement, with influence based on organisational work and support rather than public prominence.

Diana Donald identifies a "strain of utopian thinking" in fin-de-siècle animal protection and argues that it was represented by the Humanitarian League, founded in 1891 by Salt and Drakoules. She also notes that Drakoules adopted vegetarianism on conscientious grounds as the movement was gaining a stronger ideological impetus.

Sky Duthie places Drakoules among reform-minded women who used the League to connect suffragist, feminist, socialist, and vegetarian causes. He identifies her as one of the League's organisers, noting that she helped found the League, served as treasurer, and campaigned throughout her life for vegetarianism, animal welfare, and related humanitarian reforms. In a study of the Aëthnic Union, a London-based feminist group in the early 1910s, Tallulah Maait Pepperell notes that Drakoules and her husband attended a meeting in September 1913. Pepperell links Drakoules's attendance to her shared work with Jessey Wade and Ernest Bell, and uses it as an example of the networks connecting feminism and vegetarian humanitarianism.

== Publications ==
- "The French Congress: Paris". The Women's Penny Paper. 1 (42). London: Women's Printing Society: 7. 10 August 1889.
- "Vegetarian Dinner in High Life". The Women's Penny Paper. 2 (58). London: Women's Printing Society: 4. 30 November 1889.
- "The Rights of the Non-Human Races". The Women's Penny Paper. 2 (60). London: Women's Printing Society: 4. 14 December 1889.
- "The Ethics of Diet". The Vegetarian. London: London Vegetarian Society. 1892.
- Humanity and Vegetarianism, Being a Paper Read Before the Vegetarian Federal Union. London: London Vegetarian Society. 1892.
- Humanity and Food Reform. 1902.
- "Treasurer's Appeal". The Humanitarian. Humanitarian League: 198. December 1916.

== See also ==
- List of animal rights activists
- List of vegetarians
- Animal welfare in the United Kingdom
- History of animal rights
- History of vegetarianism
- Vegetarianism in the Victorian era
- Louise Lind af Hageby – Swedish-British feminist (1878–1963)
- Nina Douglas-Hamilton, Duchess of Hamilton – British peeress and activist (1878–1951)
- Henry Stephens Salt – British writer and social reformer (1851–1939)
