= Joseph Stratton (clergyman) =

English clergyman, humanitarian, writer, and activist (1839–1917)

The Reverend Joseph Stratton
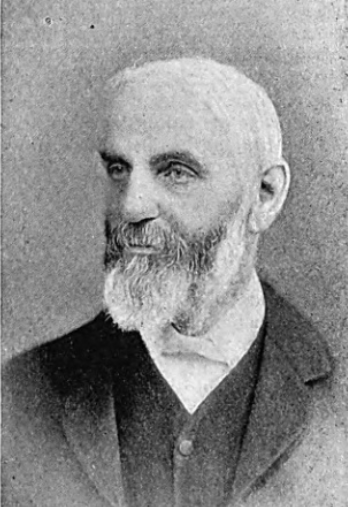
- Joseph Stratton from The Animals' Friend, 1895
- Born: 1 May 1839; Clifton Campville, England
- Died: 11 January 1917 (aged 77); Wokingham, England
- Education: Worcester College, Oxford
- Occupations: Clergyman; humanitarian; writer; activist
- Years active: 1870–1917
- Spouse: Louise Cecilia Bazalgette Lucas (m. 1892)

Joseph Stratton (1 May 1839 – 11 January 1917) was an English clergyman, humanitarian, writer, and activist. After serving in various church roles, he became Master of the Henry Lucas Hospital in Wokingham. A dedicated animal rights advocate, he campaigned successfully against the Royal Buckhounds, opposed vivisection, blood sports, and hunting, and was active in the Humanitarian League and London and Provincial Anti-Vivisection Society. Stratton also authored a number of books and pamphlets on these issues and published two poetry collections.

== Biography ==
=== Early life and education ===
Stratton was born in Clifton Campville on 1 May 1839. He was the second son of John and Anne Statton. He was educated at Appleby Grammar School and Worcester College, Oxford. He obtained his B.A. in 1862 and M.A. in 1867.

=== Ecclesiastical career ===
Stratton was ordained in 1870 and was a curate in Swansea, Burton upon Trent, New Barnet. He left the church on theological grounds in 1878, but returned in 1886 as curate of Winchfield. Stratton was appointed Master of Henry Lucas Hospital, Wokingham, from 1889 to 1917.

=== Activism ===
Stratton opposed blood sports and hunting. He aimed to abolish the Royal Buckhounds which he carried out with success. He was presented with a public testimonial in 1901. Stratton stated that he had observed the buckhounds at Wokingham and was horrified by the cruelty that had been committed in the Queen's name. He was a member of the Humanitarian League's campaign against hunting and was honorary secretary of their Sports Department. Sidney Trist noted that threats against Stratton's life had been made by those who opposed his anti-hunting views.

Stratton was an anti-vivisectionist and member of the Berkshire branch of the London and Provincial Anti-Vivisection Society. Stratton became critical of the Church Society for the Promotion of Kindness to Animals for not condemning vivisection. He was described as a "warm-hearted and tender-hearted man, who loves not only his fellow-men, but also his fellow-creatures".

=== Poetry ===
Stratton published his first collection of poetry in 1901, Fireside Poems. In 1915, he published Ethelfleda and Other Poems, initially written for the Millenary celebration of Tamworth Castle in 1913. The collection received praise, including commendation from G. W. E. Russell.

=== Personal life and death ===
In 1892, Stratton married Louise Cecilia Bazalgette Lucas, daughter of St. John Welles Lucas, M.R.C.S., and Louisa Bazalgette.

Stratton fell outside Wokingham Gas Works, likely due to a heart attack, and never recovered from the effects of the accident. He died on 11 January 1917. His funeral was held at St. Paul's Wokingham. He received a floral tribute from the Committee of the British Union for the Abolition of Vivisection for his "admiration and affection to the memory of a fearless and untiring champion of the rights of animals". Stratton's will and testament was written in verse form.

== Publications ==
- Royal Sport: Some Facts Concerning the Queen's Buckhounds (1891)
- "The Royal Buckhounds: A Plea For Their Abolition". The Animals' Friend. 1 (10): 127. 1895.
- "A Fox Hunt". The Animals' Friend. 2: 140. 1896.
- So-Called Sport: A Plea for Strengthening the Law for the Protection of Animals. London: Humanitarian League. 1896. (with William Lisle Blenkinsopp Coulson and R. H. Jude)
- Vivisection and Anti-Vivisection: Which Side Must I Take? (1898)
- Sports: Legitimate and Illegitimate (1898)
- Cruel Sport at Eton College (1899)
- Tame Stag Hunting (1899)
- Fireside Poems (1901)
- The Decline and Fall of the Royal Buckhounds (1901)
- A Defence of the Broad Churchman's Position in the Establishment (1902)
- Letter to a Friend on Theology (1902)
- The Attitude, Past and Present, of the R.S.P.C.A. Towards such Spurious Sports as Tame Deer Hunting, Pigeon Shooting and Coursing Rabbits (1906)
- Hunting the Carted Stag (1907)
- "Blood-Sports". The Animals' Cause. 1: 261–266. 1909.
- Ethelfleda and Other Poems (1915)

== Quotes ==
Suppose the Founder of our religion stood beside a table, on which a dog was pinioned, and heard its piteous howlings, while the bloody knife was cutting into its vitals; or passed pens, where animals were being deliberately starved; or saw cats being baked alive, what would He say and do? He would, most certainly, burning with indignation, empty on the vivisectors and their miserable pleas and vials of His anger and scorn as He did of old on the obstinate and hypocritical Pharisees.

— Joseph Stratton, The Church and Animal Rights, 1892
