= R. H. Jude =

English mathematician and physicist

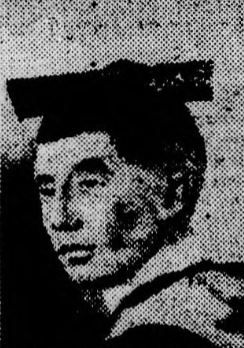
- Born: Richard Henry Jude; 1853; Camberwell
- Died: 1 June 1924 (aged 71); Eltham
- Occupations: Mathematician, physicist

Richard Henry Jude (1853 – 1 June 1924) was an English mathematician, physicist and animal rights campaigner.

== Career ==
Jude was born in Camberwell and was educated at King's College London where he won a mathematics scholarship. In 1872 he received honours from University of London and qualified B.Sc with first-class honours in mathematics. In 1878, he obtained a Doctor of Science degree in organic chemistry from the University of London and in 1880 proceeded to a Master of Arts degree at Cambridge University.

He was appointed lecturer in mathematics and science at Rutherford College in 1882 where he remained until his retirement in 1917. He was Head of the Physical and Mathematical Departments. As a teacher he was credited with playing a prominent role in the higher education of young engineers. He authored four physics textbooks which were translated into Russian and invented new physics apparatus which were patented.

== Animal rights ==
Jude was an advocate of animal rights and served on the provisional committee of the Humanitarian League in 1891. In 1891, Jude authored a paper for the National Cat Club on "Feline Intelligence". In 1892, he authored a pamphlet for the Humanitarian League criticizing the cruelty of rabbit coursing. Jude wrote that the rabbits "often half-starved, and with their legs broken, are huddled together in a sack, with no more consideration than if they were so many bundles of wood" and how they were turned loose to be chased by greyhounds and other dogs to be bitten to death or disembowelled.

Jude was an honorary correspondent of the Victoria Street Society for the Protection of Animals from Vivisection. He was a speaker at the 1892 annual meeting of the London Anti-Vivisection Society. In 1897, he contributed an article to Henry S. Salt's Cruelties of Civilization: A Programme of Humane Reform.

== Death ==
Jude towards the end of his life had diabetes and was deaf and blind. He died at Eltham on 1 June 1924, aged 71. He was buried at Borough Green Baptist Cemetery. In spite of his ill health in his last years, an obituary in the Nature journal noted that he "retained to the end a brave fortitude in his outlook, an active and a clear mentality, and his letters rarely lacked in that spark of dry humour so characteristic of him in earlier years".

== Selected publications ==
- Rabbit Coursing: An Appeal to Working Men for the Humanitarian League. London: Humanitarian League. 1892.
- So-Called Sport: A Plea for Strengthening the Law for the Protection of Animals. London: Humanitarian League. 1896. (with Joseph Stratton and William Lisle Blenkinsopp Coulson)
- Cruelties of Civilization: A Programme of Humane Reform. London: Reeves & Turner. 1897.
- First Stage Magnetism and Electricity. London: W. B. Clive. 1898.
- Physics, Experimental and Theoretical. London: Chapman and Hall. 1899.
- Matriculation Magnetism and Electricity. Cambridge: University Tutorial Press. 1910.
- Junior Magnetism and Electricity. London: W. B. Clive. 1912.
