= Jennie Brace =

English social reformer and writer (1855–1925)

- Born: Jane Chapman Ragg; 1855; Edmonton, Middlesex, England
- Died: 10 January 1925 (aged 70); Letchworth, England
- Resting place: Golders Green Crematorium
- Other names: Jennie Chapman Brace; Jennie C. Brace
- Occupations: Social reformer; writer
- Organization: Humanitarian League
- Known for: Humanitarianism, vegetarianism, and anti-vivisection activism
- Spouse: Charles Richmond Brace
- Children: 2

Jane Chapman Brace (née Ragg; 1855 – 10 January 1925), who wrote as Jennie Brace, was an English social reformer and writer. She advocated for humanitarianism, vegetarianism, and anti-vivisection. She was associated with the Humanitarian League, serving on the committee of its Humane Diet Department from 1900, and wrote on humanitarian and vegetarian causes.

== Biography ==
=== Early life and family ===
Brace was born Jane Chapman Ragg in the first quarter of 1855 at Edmonton, Middlesex. Her parents were William Ragg and Anna Ragg. By 1891, she was married to Charles Richmond Brace, and they had a son and daughter. She lived at Stamford Hill during the 1890s.

=== Career ===
Brace became interested in anti-vivisection after encountering a letter on the subject in The Animals' Friend, and this subsequently drew her towards vegetarianism. She was also opposed to trades that she regarded as harmful.

In June 1899, Brace contributed an article to The Vegetarian Messenger on what she regarded as inconsistencies among women involved in humanitarian reform. Family circumstances limited the extent of her public activity, although she attended meetings and hosted at least one meeting at her home.

Brace was a member of the Humanitarian League and joined the committee of its Humane Diet Department in 1900. She frequently contributed letters to Humanity, the League's journal, calling for cooperation between reformers and for consistency among animal advocates. She also wrote to C. W. Daniel's periodical The Crank in 1904 and 1905 in defence of vegetarianism.

=== Death ===
Following a long illness, Brace died on 10 January 1925, at Letchworth, aged 70. She was cremated at Golders Green Crematorium on 14 January.

== See also ==
- History of vegetarianism
- Women and vegetarianism and veganism advocacy
- Women in the Victorian era
- Vegetarianism in the United Kingdom
- Vegetarianism in the Victorian era
