= Platon Drakoulis =

Greek politician (1858–1942)

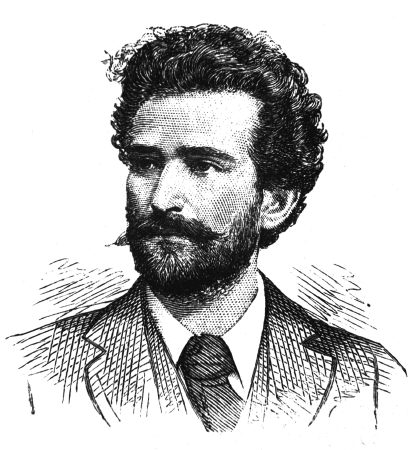
- Born: Platon Eustathios Drakoulis; 1858; Ithaca, United States of the Ionian Islands
- Died: 27 May 1942 (aged 1858); London, England
- Education: University of Oxford; National and Kapodistrian University of Athens
- Occupations: Professor, journalist, politician
- Spouse: Alice Marie Lewis (m. 1907; died 1933)

Platon Eustathios Drakoulis or Drakoules (Greek: Πλάτων Δρακούλης; 1858 – 27 May 1942) was a Greek socialist politician. He worked as a lecturer at Oxford University and was one of the pioneers of the socialist labour movement in Greece. An energetic agitator and the most prominent figure in the nascent socialist movement, Drakoulis founded the Workers League of Greece (Σύνδεσμος των Εργατικών Τάξεων της Ελλάδας). In August 1910, he was one of ten socialists elected to the national parliament and cooperated with the political party of Eleftherios Venizelos. He supported Greece's war efforts during the First World War. Drakoulis was a founder of the Greek Anti-Carnivore society and married English humanitarian and animal welfare campaigner Alice Marie Lewis (née Lambe), in 1907.

== Selected publications ==
- Mouvement cosmopolite in La Révolution cosmopolite, a French anarchist publication, where he describes the situation in Greece (1887)
- Study of the French Revolution (1890)
- Specimen for the Worker: The Foundations of Socialism (1893)
- Light Insider (1894)
- Greek Language and Literature (1897)
- Emancipation of Women (1912)
