= George Bell (publisher) =

English publisher (1814–1890)

- Born: 12 October 1814
- Died: 27 November 1890
- Children: Edward Bell

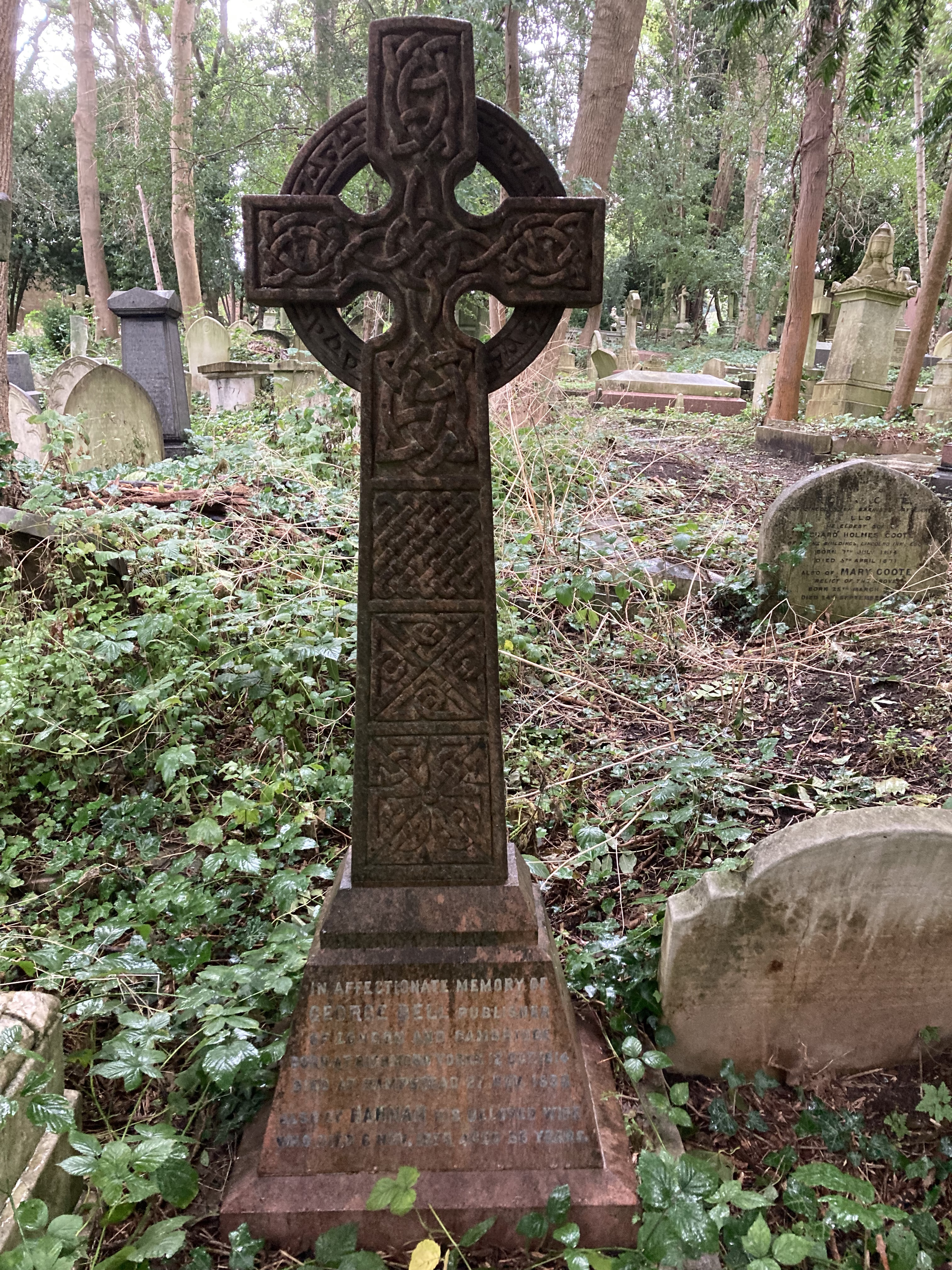
Bell's grave in Highgate Cemetery

George Bell (12 October 1814 – 27 November 1890) was an English publisher. He founded the book publishing house George Bell & Sons. He was the father of the publishers Edward and Ernest Bell.

== Biography ==
George Bell was born on 12 October 1814, the fifth of 13 children of Matthew Bell, bookseller, stationer, and bookbinder in Richmond, Yorkshire, and his wife, Mary (née Fall). After attending the local grammar school, he helped his father, before moving to London in 1832 to join Whittaker & Co. Bell later set up his own business in 1839, funded by savings and a family loan.

Bell married Hannah Simpson in 1840 and became the London representative for several academic publishers. He collaborated with the Macmillan brothers and launched notable series such as the Grammar School Classics and the Bibliotheca Classica. In 1847, he started the Journal of Education and, three years later, Notes and Queries.

Bell partnered with F. R. Daldy in 1855, and their firm published several important series and advocated for authors' rights. After Daldy left in 1873, the firm became George Bell & Sons, renowned for books on art, architecture, and archaeology. Bell's significant acquisitions included Henry George Bohn's libraries and various dictionaries and historical works.

George Bell retired in 1888, passing the business to his sons Edward and Ernest. He died of bronchitis on 27 November 1890. He is buried on the western side of Highgate Cemetery.
