= Arthur St. John =

British soldier and novelist

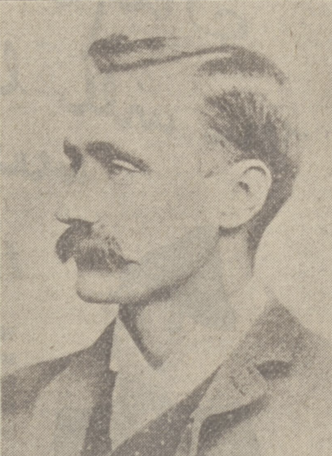
- Born: Arthur John St. John; 8 September 1862; Jullundar, British Raj
- Died: 16 February 1938 (aged 75); Bonnybridge, Scotland, UK
- Occupations: Soldier, novelist
- Spouse: Leonora Maxwell-Müller (m. 1903)

Captain Arthur John St. John (8 September 1862 – 16 February 1938) was a British soldier, novelist and Tolstoyan who campaigned for pacifism, prison reform and vegetarianism. He was co-founder and secretary of the Penal Reform League.

== Career ==
Captain St. John was born at Jullundar in 1862. He was the second son of Lieutenant Colonel Charles William St. John and Madalina Green.

In 1882, he joined the Royal Inniskilling Fusiliers and served in Malta, Aldershot and Burma. His outlook on life changed after reading Tolstoy's works. He resigned his commission and moved to Yorkshire and then Croydon in voluntarily poverty to carry out social work. He was a minimalist who spent most of his small earnings on others. He was a member of Croydon Brotherhood Church. In October 1894, he wrote a letter to Tolstoy stating that The Kingdom of God Is Within You had a "tremendous effect upon" him and that he gave up soldiering to work for peace. He left Croydon and spent time at an agricultural community, Rev. H. Mill's Farm Colony in Kendal. Captain St. John was inspired by Job Harriman's utopian community called Llano del Rio. He founded the British Llano Circle and with the help of Ernest Bairstow published the British Llano Circle Bulletin. He also visited Whiteway Colony and kept in contact with the colonists.

He visited Tolstoy at Yasnaya Polyana in 1897 and was acquainted with the persecution of Doukhobors. In 1898, he raised money for the Doukhobors through the help of Quakers but was arrested and imprisoned. It was only through the influence of his friends at the British consul that he was eventually released on the condition that he would leave Russia. He secured the escape of Doukhobors and went with them to Cyprus and then to Canada where he resided for two years. At this time his ban from returning to Russia was lifted.

Captain St. John returned to England in 1901 and married Leonora Maxwell-Müller in 1903. He edited the short-lived Midland Herald newspaper based in Bilston from June 1902 to 1905, succeeding John Coleman Kenworthy. Captain St. John and Kenworthy had both used the newspaper to promote Tolstoyism. His articles on the miscarriage of justice were published as Crime and Common Sense in 1904. He was a member of the Humanitarian League.

In 1907, in conjunction with Anne Cobden-Sanderson, he founded the Penal Reform League of which he was secretary. He allied himself with suffragettes who gave him their first hand experiences with prison conditions. At the beginning of WWI, he went to France as an ambulance worker for two years. In 1916, he returned to prison reform for several years until secretary Margery Fry was elected to continue his work. The League was incorporated into the Howard League for Penal Reform. He moved to Glenyards, Scotland to finish literary work and enjoy family life. His utopian novel was sent to the publisher on 27 January 1938. It was titled Why Not Now? and published by C. W. Daniel Company in 1939.

== Vegetarianism ==
Captain St. John was described as an animal lover who was a "staunch unswerving vegetarian" for 40 years. He made Croydon Brotherhood Church's store "a depot for wholesome non-flesh food". In 1901, he was a speaker at a Northern Heights Vegetarian Society meeting in Hampstead.

== Death ==
Captain St. John suffered from a heart complaint in 1934. He consented treatment in a private ward of the Falkirk and District Royal Infirmary when it was found that nothing could be done for him. He returned to his home and died peacefully on 16 February 1938. He had requested no flowers, mourning or grave. A small service was held at his home conducted by Rev. Ivor Ramsay and his remains were sent to Glasgow Crematorium. His ashes were scattered at Ochil Hills in Dumyat. An obituary described him as a "real Christian gentleman, leaving to all who knew him nought but fragrant memories of the kindnesses he bestowed upon young and old, rich and poor".

== Selected publications ==
- Crime and Common Sense. C. W. Daniel Company. 1904.
- "National Defence and Peace". Humane Review: 170. 1905.
- "Inside Prison Walls: First-Hand Experiences". The Standard. 29 April 1912. p. 12.
- Why Not Now? A British Islander's Dream. C. W. Daniel Company. 1939. (with an introduction by Dugald Semple)
