= Humanitarian League =

British humanitarian organisation (1891–1919)

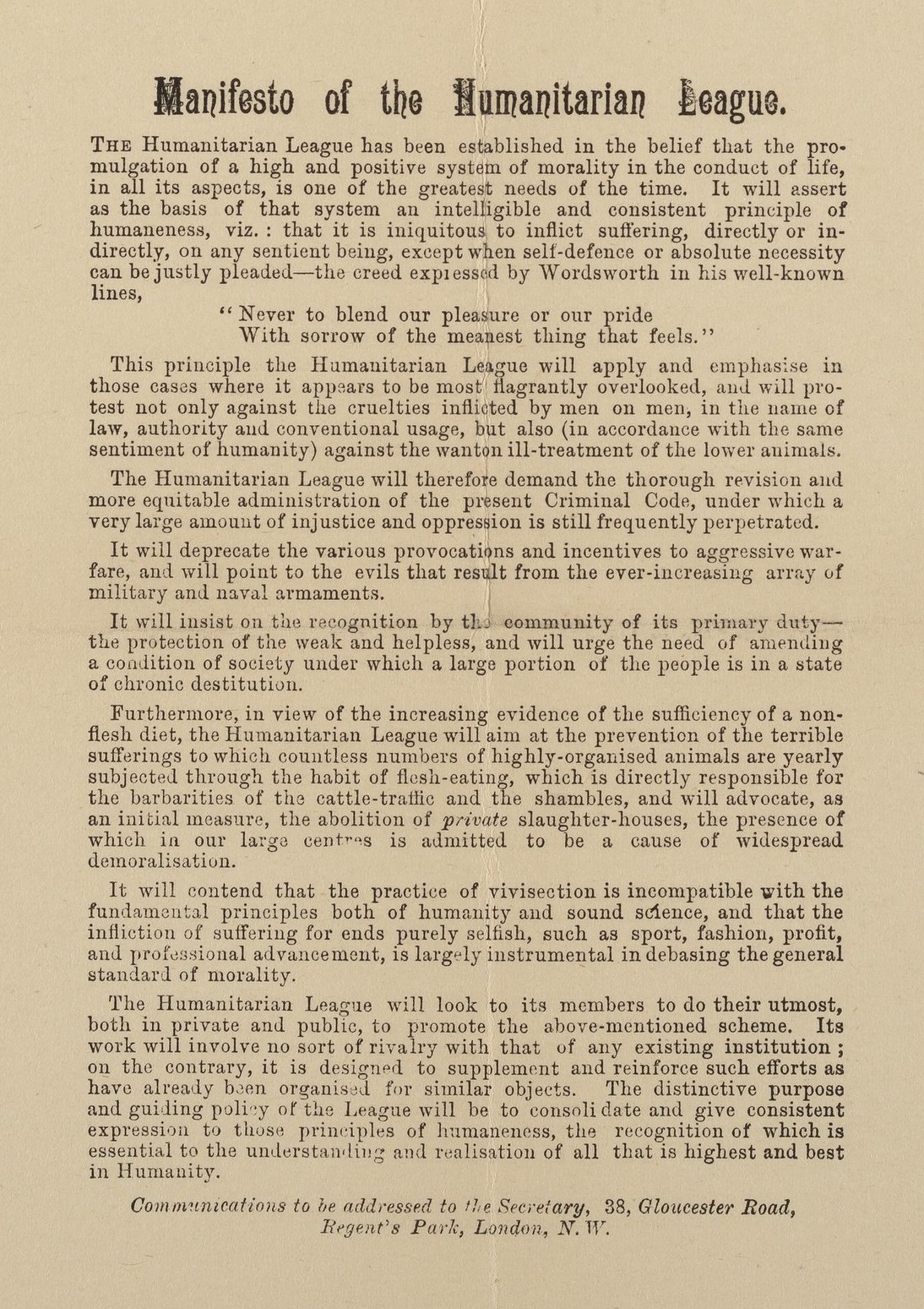
- Manifesto of the League
- Formation: 1891; 135 years ago
- Founders: Henry S. Salt; Edward Maitland; Ernest Bell; Howard Williams; Kenneth Romanes; Alice Lewis
- Dissolved: December 1919; 106 years ago
- Headquarters: Gloucester Road, London (1891–1895); Great Queen Street, London (1891–1897); Chancery Lane, London (1897–1919)
- Fields: Humanitarianism
- Main organ: Humanity; The Humanitarian

The Humanitarian League was a British humanitarian organisation based in London from 1891 to 1919. Founded by Henry S. Salt with Edward Maitland, Ernest Bell, Howard Williams, Kenneth Romanes and Alice Lewis, it opposed avoidable suffering inflicted on sentient beings and applied this principle to human and animal welfare.

The League campaigned against capital and corporal punishment, blood sports, vivisection and compulsory vaccination, and supported changes to criminal law and prison practices. It published the journals Humanity (1895–1902), The Humanitarian (1902–1919) and The Humane Review (1900–1910), as well as books and pamphlets. Its membership and activity declined during the First World War, and the organisation dissolved in 1919. Former members later helped to found the League for the Prohibition of Cruel Sports, now the League Against Cruel Sports.

== History ==
=== Background ===
In The Ethics of Diet (1883), a history of vegetarianism, Howard Williams proposed the creation of a humane society with a broader scope than any that existed at the time. Henry S. Salt developed a similar idea in an 1889 article on humanitarianism in The Westminster Review, where he argued for a consistent principle of humaneness applied to all sentient beings.

=== Formation ===
Salt founded the Humanitarian League in 1891 and served as its general secretary and editor of its publications. Other founding members included Edward Maitland, Ernest Bell (chairman of committee and treasurer), Howard Williams, Kenneth Romanes and Alice Lewis (treasurer). Its inaugural meeting was held at Lewis's house, 14 Park Square, London, and she remained treasurer throughout the League's existence. Many of the founders were also members of the Shelley Society.

The provisional committee in April 1891 consisted of William E. A. Axon, R. H. Jude, Alice Lewis, Edward Maitland, R. E. O'Callaghan, Rev. G. J. Ouseley, Kenneth Romanes, Howard Williams and Salt.

=== Aims and principles ===
The League's guiding principle was that it was iniquitous to inflict avoidable suffering on any sentient being. Its manifesto declared:

The Humanitarian League has been established on the basis of an intelligible and consistent principle of humaneness – that it is iniquitous to inflict suffering, directly or indirectly, on any sentient being, except when self-defence or absolute necessity can justly be pleaded.

The League opposed corporal and capital punishment, hunting for sport, vivisection and compulsory vaccination. Many members were vegetarians, and the League aimed to reduce animal suffering.

=== Organisation and activities ===
==== Headquarters ====
The League originally operated out of Salt's rooms in Gloucester Road, London. In 1895 the League opened an office at 79 Great Queen Street. From 1897, it was headquartered at Chancery Lane.

==== Executive committee ====
The League's executive committee consisted of Ernest Bell, Alfred Binns, Hypatia Bradlaugh Bonner, Herbert Burrows, Joseph Collinson, Helen Densmore, Edmund Harvey, Mrs. C. Mallet, W. Douglas Morrison, Henry S. Salt, Howard Williams and Llewellyn W. Williams.

==== Campaigns and departments ====
The League organised campaigns against blood sports, punishments for vagrancy, imprisonment for debt, "crimes of conscience", and what it called other "barbarisms of the age". It also campaigned for human rights, contributed to the 1906 ban on flogging in the Royal Navy, and sought reform of laws on imprisonment for debt and non-criminal offences.

In 1894 the League drafted the Sport Regulation Bill, which was introduced in Parliament by Alpheus Morton. The bill would have prohibited the hunting, coursing and shooting of animals kept in confinement.

In 1895 the League was divided into four departments: the Criminal Law and Prison Reform Department, the Sports Department, the Humane Diet Department and the Lectures for Children. Each department had a separate committee. In the same year, it held the first National Humanitarian Conference.

Joseph Stratton was honorary secretary of the Sports Department. The department condemned blood sports and any sport that caused suffering to animals. In 1897 the Humane Diet Department was renamed the Humane Diet and Dress Department, and in 1898 an Indian Humanitarian Committee was established.

The Animals Defence Committee replaced the Humane Diet and Dress Department and the Sports Department. In 1909 the committee campaigned against cruelty in slaughterhouses, stag hunting, school-beagling, the use of plumes and seal-skin, and snake-feeding at zoological gardens. Members included R. Stephen Ayling, Ernest Bell, Joseph Collinson, Charles W. Forward and George Penn-Gaskell.

In 1908 the Criminal Law and Prison Reform Department merged into the Criminal Law and Prison Reform Committee, which covered British and Indian affairs. Joseph Collinson served as honorary secretary of the committee for thirteen years.

==== Branches ====
Local branches of the League were established at Croydon and Letchworth after a meeting in 1909. A Manchester branch was formed with support from William E. A. Axon, William Byles and Rev. A. O. Broadley in 1912. By 1914 the Croydon branch had 56 members.

==== Publications ====
The Humanitarian, December 1909

The League published periodicals edited by Henry S. Salt: Humanity (1895–1902), later renamed The Humanitarian (1902–1919), and the quarterly The Humane Review (1900–1910). It also issued books and pamphlets.

=== Decline and closure ===
During the First World War, the League's membership and publication output declined. The organisation closed in December 1919, shortly after the death of Salt's wife.

== Legacy ==
=== Later influence ===
In 1924, former League members Henry Brown Amos and Ernest Bell established the League for the Prohibition of Cruel Sports, which later became the League Against Cruel Sports.

=== Reuse of the name ===
The name "Humanitarian League" was later adopted by an organisation registered in Hong Kong in 2013. This group operates alongside the Ernest Bell Library, republishing historical humanitarian pamphlets and books.

== People associated with the League ==
People associated with the Humanitarian League included formal officers, committee members, campaign supporters, writers and lecturers. The following tables list founders, office-holders, committee members and supporters identified in cited sources.

=== Founders ===
Name	Occupation	Role in League	Source
Henry S. Salt	Writer, social reformer, animal rights activist and vegetarian activist	General secretary and editor of the League's journals	
Edward Maitland	Writer and theosophist	Member of provisional and executive committees	
Ernest Bell	Publisher, writer and animal activist	Chairman of committee and treasurer	
Howard Williams	Writer, historian and vegetarian activist	Member of provisional committee	
Kenneth Romanes	Translator, writer and humanitarian activist	Member of provisional committee	
Alice Lewis	Philanthropist and activist	Treasurer and member of provisional committee	

=== People with roles ===
Name	Occupation	Role in League	Source
William E. A. Axon	Librarian, antiquarian and journalist	Member of provisional committee	
R. H. Jude	Mathematician, physicist and animal rights activist	Member of provisional committee	
R. E. O'Callaghan	Activist, lecturer and writer	Member of provisional committee	
Hypatia Bradlaugh Bonner	Activist and writer	Member of executive committee	
Herbert Burrows	Socialist activist	Member of executive committee	
Edmund Harvey	Social reformer and politician	Member of executive committee	
Joseph Stratton	Clergyman, writer and activist	Honorary secretary, Sports Department	
Joseph Collinson	Journalist and writer	Member of Animals Defence Committee; honorary secretary, Criminal Law and Prison Reform Department	
Charles W. Forward	Activist, writer and historian	Member of Animals Defence Committee	
Carl Heath	Quaker activist	Member of Criminal Law and Prison Reform Department	
James Charles Mathew	Judge	Member of Criminal Law and Prison Reform Department	
Jessey Wade	Animal welfare activist and editor	Honorary secretary, Children's Department	
Henry John Williams	Clergyman and activist	Member of Humane Diet Department	
Jennie Brace	Social reformer and writer	Member of Humane Diet Department	

=== Members and supporters ===
Name	Occupation	Source
Henry Brown Amos	Campaigner, animal rights activist and vegetarian activist	
Annie Besant	Writer, women's rights activist, home rule activist and theosophist	
Thomas Baty	Lawyer, feminist and international law reformer	
Stella Browne	Feminist and birth control activist	
Edith Carrington	Writer and animal welfare activist	
Edward Carpenter	Writer, poet, socialist and vegetarian activist	
Anne Cobden-Sanderson	Suffragist and socialist activist	
Colonel William Lisle Blenkinsopp Coulson	Army officer, prison reform activist and anti-hunting activist	
Ernest Howard Crosby	Writer and reformer	
Clarence Darrow	Lawyer, civil liberties activist and anti-death-penalty activist	
Michael Davitt	Politician, Irish nationalist and land reformer	
Charlotte Despard	Suffragist and socialist activist	
John Dillon	Politician and Irish nationalist	
G. W. Foote	Journalist, editor and secularist activist	
Isabella Ford	Labour activist and suffragist	
Sigmund Freud	Psychoanalyst	
John Galsworthy	Novelist and playwright	
Keir Hardie	Politician and trade unionist	
Thomas Hardy	Novelist and poet	
Arthur Harvie	Clergyman	
John Page Hopps	Unitarian minister and writer	
W. H. Hudson	Author, naturalist and ornithologist	
George Cecil Ives	Writer, poet, penal reform activist and homosexual law reform activist	
Lizzy Lind af Hageby	Writer, anti-vivisection activist and suffragist	
Bertram Lloyd	Writer, poet, naturalist and anti-blood-sports activist	
Tom Mann	Trade unionist and socialist activist	
J. Howard Moore	Zoologist, philosopher, animal rights activist and vegetarian activist	
Conrad Noel	Anglican priest and Christian socialist	
Josiah Oldfield	Lawyer, physician and vegetarian activist	
Sydney Olivier, 1st Baron Olivier	Civil servant, politician and Fabian socialist	
Alice Park	Suffragist and reformer	
Christabel Pankhurst	Suffragette and political organiser	
George Bernard Shaw	Playwright, critic and vegetarian activist	
Arthur St. John	Writer	
Enid Stacy	Socialist activist and suffragist	
Leo Tolstoy	Writer, philosopher, Christian anarchist and vegetarian activist	
Ralph Waldo Trine	Writer, philosopher, animal welfare activist and vegetarian activist	
Alfred Russel Wallace	Naturalist, explorer and social reformer	

== Selected publications ==
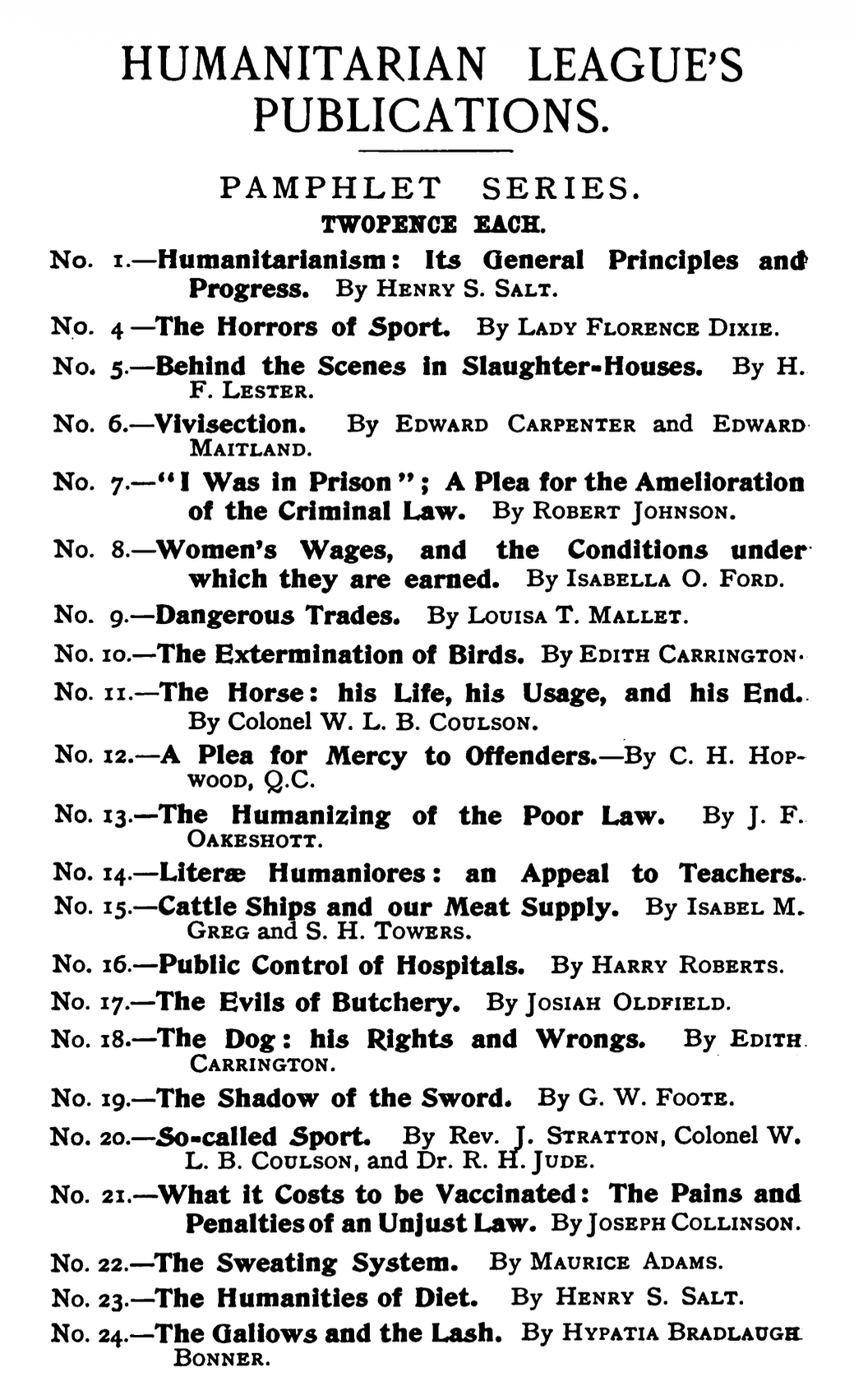
The Humanitarian League's Publications, 1897

=== Books ===
- Moore, J. Howard (1906). The Universal Kinship. Humanitarian League.

=== Pamphlets ===
==== The Humanitarian League's Publications ====
1. Salt, Henry S. (1891). Humanitarianism: Its General Principles and Progress. London: William Reeves. OCLC 7301794.
2. Stratton, Joseph (1891). Royal Sport: Some Facts Concerning the Queen's Buckhounds. London: William Reeves. OCLC 32797459.
3. Jude, R. H. (1892). Rabbit Coursing: An Appeal to Working Men. London: William Reeves. OCLC 29286962.
4. Dixie, Lady Florence (1892). The Horrors of Sport. London: William Reeves. OCLC 266995835.
5. Lester, H. F. (1892). Behind the Scenes in Slaughter-Houses. London: William Reeves. OCLC 906658421.
6. Carpenter, Edward; Maitland, Edward (1893). Vivisection. London: William Reeves. OCLC 80267577.
7. R. J. (1893). "I Was in Prison": A Plea for the Amelioration of the Criminal Law. London: William Reeves. OCLC 80380523.
8. Ford, Isabella (1893). Women's Wages and the Conditions Under Which They Are Earned. London: William Reeves. OCLC 78943043.
9. Mallett, C. (1893). Dangerous Trades for Women. London: William Reeves. OCLC 11239271.
10. Carrington, Edith (1894). The Extermination of Birds. London: William Reeves. OCLC 84021277.
11. Coulson, W. L. B. (1894). The Horse: His Life, His Usage, and His End. London: William Reeves. OCLC 266995824.
12. Hopwood, C. H. (1894). A Plea for Mercy to Offenders. London: William Reeves. OCLC 13979601.
13. Oakeshott, J. F. (1894). The Humanizing of the Poor Law. London: William Reeves. OCLC 1232459238.
14. Salt, Henry S. (1894). Literae Humaniores: An Appeal to Teachers. London: William Reeves. OCLC 1434140016.
15. Greg, Isabel M.; Towers, S. H. (1894). Cattle Ships and our Meat Supply. London: William Reeves. OCLC 1257315847.
16. Roberts, Harry (1895). Public Control of Hospitals. London: William Reeves. OCLC 32797385.
17. Oldfield, Josiah (1895). The Evils of Butchery. London: William Reeves. OCLC 61456075.
18. Carrington, Edith (1895). The Dog: His Rights and Wrongs. London: William Reeves. OCLC 1118563947.
19. Foote, G. W. (1895). The Shadow of the Sword. London: William Reeves. OCLC 44488763.
20. Stratton, J.; Coulson, W. L. B.; Jude, R. H. (1896). So-Called Sport: A Plea for Strengthening the Law for the Protection of Animals. London: William Reeves. OCLC 21055606.
21. Collinson, Joseph (1896). What it Costs to be Vaccinated: The Pains and Penalties of an Unjust Law. London: William Reeves. OCLC 14798180.
22. Adams, Maurice (1896). The Sweating System. London: William Reeves. OCLC 21634469.
23. Salt, Henry S. (1897). The Humanities of Diet. London: William Reeves. OCLC 9377479.
24. Bradlaugh Bonner, Hypatia (1897). The Gallows and the Lash. London: William Reeves. OCLC 2563121.

==== Others ====
1. Suckling, Florence H. (1896). Lectures for Children. Humanitarian League.
2. Suckling, Florence H. (1896). Our Insect Helpers. Humanitarian League.
3. Suckling, Florence H. (1896). The Ant. Humanitarian League.
4. Suckling, Florence H. (1896). The Cat. Humanitarian League.
5. Suckling, Florence H. (1896). The Dog. Humanitarian League.
6. Verschoyle, John Stuart (1901). Slaughter-House Reform. Humanitarian League.
7. Collinson, Joseph (1902). The Fate of the Fur Seal. William Reeves for the Humanitarian League.
8. Dickerson, Philip (1904). The Eton College Hare-Hunt. Humanitarian League.
9. Salt, Henry S. (1912). The Case Against Corporal Punishment. Humanitarian League.
10. Salt, Henry S. (1915). Salt, Henry S. (ed.). Killing for Sport: Essays by Various Writers. G. Bell & Sons.

=== Series ===
- Animal Life Readers
- Lantern Lectures for Children

== See also ==
- Order of the Golden Age, Christian vegetarian and humanitarian organisation
- Progressive League, a later group operating on the same basis
- Ethical Union, now known as Humanists UK, its sister organisation
- List of animal rights groups
