= Florence H. Suckling =

English activist and writer (1848–1923)

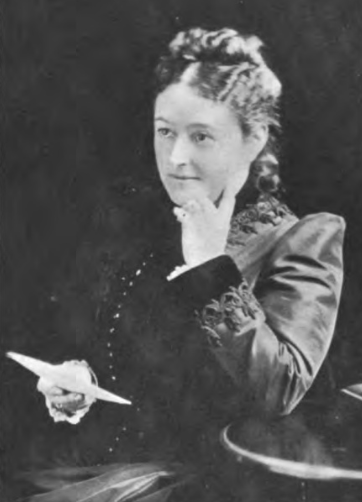
- Born: Florence Horatia Nelson Suckling; 8 October 1848; Romsey, England
- Died: 10 December 1923 (aged 75); Romsey, England
- Occupations: Activist; writer; educator; historian
- Spouse: Thomas Suckling (m. 1876)
- Children: 1

Florence Horatia Nelson Suckling (8 October 1848 – 10 December 1923) was an English animal welfare activist, writer, humane educator, and local historian. She organised one of the earliest Bands of Mercy in Britain, running classes and magic lantern shows to teach children kindness to animals. An opponent of vivisection, she was active in the RSPCA and Royal Society for the Protection of Birds, and served as the English representative of the American Humane Education Society. Suckling published books and storybooks for children on humane education and natural history, contributed to the RSPCA's Animal World, and wrote historical articles on Hampshire for the Hampshire Field Club & Archaeological Society.

== Biography ==
=== Early and personal life ===
Suckling was born at Romsey on 8 October 1848. She was the daughter of Admiral William Benjamin Suckling and resided at Highwood for many years. She married her cousin Captain Thomas Suckling in 1876. They had one son born 1877 but lived only two months due to cerebral meningitis. In 1905, she donated a memorial window of Reverend Maurice Suckling (1676–1730), grandfather of Lord Nelson to Barsham church.

=== Humane education and Bands of Mercy ===
Suckling was a devoted Bands of Mercy worker to educate children. From 1874 at her residence at Highwood House in Romsey she delivered humane classes and magic lantern shows to encourage kindness to animals. During the classes she would read chapters from Caroline Bray's Our Duty to Animals; the reading group was originally called the "Humanity Class". She also established a humane library. Suckling's humanity class has been cited as the first Band of Mercy and was she referred to as the "Animals' Friend". In the 1890s her humanity class became known as the "Army of Kindness". She authored a series of "Lectures for Children" on insects and mammals that were published by the Humanitarian League.

=== Work with animal welfare organisations ===
Suckling worked for the Romsey branch of the RSPCA of which she was honorary secretary. She authored articles for the RSPCA's Animal World. She was an opponent of vivisection and stabled old horses she had saved from slaughter. Suckling was the English representative of the American Humane Education Society. She was a member of the Animals' Friend Society and an honorary local secretary of the Royal Society for the Protection of Birds.

=== Historical research and writing ===
Suckling was a historian of Hampshire who did research from a variety of sources including John Latham's manuscripts, Heywood Sumner's maps and wills. She attended meetings and authored articles and pamphlets. Her work was published by the Hampshire Field Club and archived by the Romsey Local History Society.

=== Death ===
Suckling died in Romsey on 10 December 1923, aged 75. She was buried at St Mark's Church, Ampfield, next to her husband. An obituary noted that she had "devoted practically the whole of her life in the cause of animals". In 1927, Edward G. Fairholme at the 50th annual meeting of the Winchester and Romsey Branch of the RSPCA proposed a memorial for Suckling.

== Selected publications ==
- The Humane Educator and Reciter. London: Simpkin, Marshall, Hamilton, Kent & Co. 1891.
- Lectures for Children. London: Humanitarian League. 1896.
- Our Insect Helpers. London: Humanitarian League. 1896.
- The Ant. London: Humanitarian League. 1896.
- The Dog. London: Humanitarian League. 1896.
- The Humane Playbook. London: Animals' Friend Society. 1900.
- The Brotherhood of Love: Stories of the Saints and Their Animal Friends. London: George Bell & Sons. 1910.
- "English Animals and the War". Our Dumb Animals. 51 (2): 27. 1918.
- "A Century of Humane Effort in England". Our Dumb Animals. 53 (2): 27. 1920.
