= Edith Carrington =

English activist and writer (1853–1929)

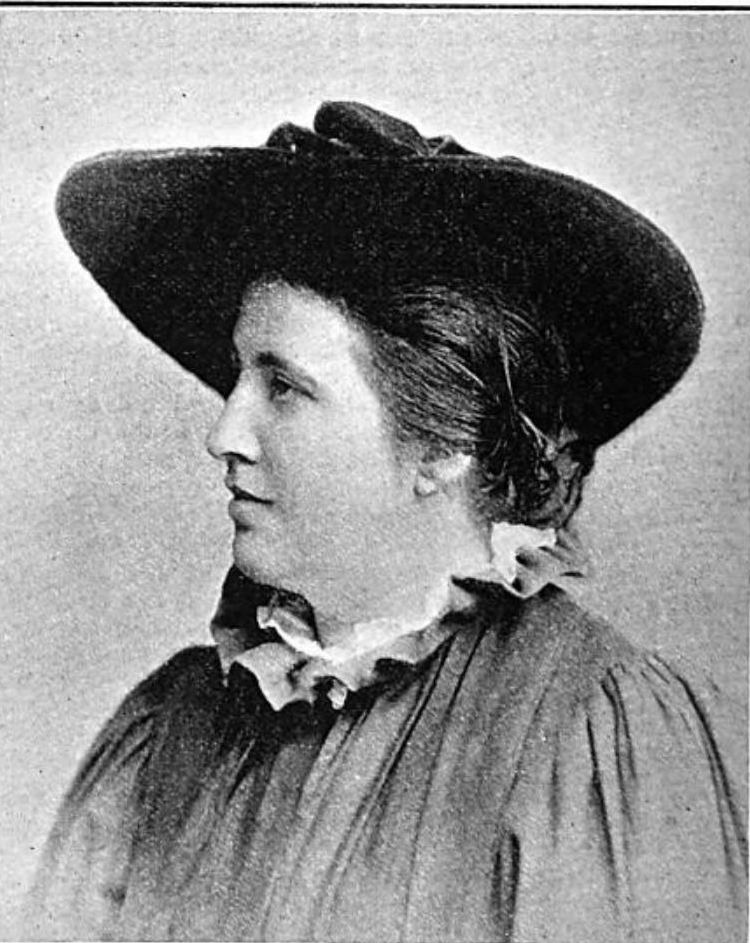
- Carrington in 1894
- Born: 1853; Swainswick, Bath, England
- Died: 23 January 1929 (aged 75); Bristol, England
- Occupations: Activist, writer
- Known for: Animal welfare and vegetarianism activism

Edith Carrington (1853 – 23 January 1929) was an English activist and writer. She was an advocate for animal welfare and vegetarianism. Carrington was for sometime an artist and later wrote several animal stories for children. She was a vocal opponent of Eleanor Anne Ormerod's campaign seeking the extermination of the house sparrow and was an anti-vivisectionist.

== Life and work ==
Carrington was born in Swainswick, Bath, into a wealthy family of naturalists. Her parents were Henry Carrington (died 1859) and Emily Heywood Johns (1814–1890). She was influenced by Charles Kingsley, who introduced her to study natural history and took on herself the "wish for no higher mission than to live and die in the cause of God's beautiful and sinless mute creatures."

She wrote regularly in the Animals' Friend (established in 1894), was a collaborator of Henry Stephens Salt, and was a participant in the Humanitarian League (established 1891). She was a member of the Church Society for the Promotion of Kindness to Animals but resigned in 1894 as the Society refused to condemn vivisection.

Carrington's first book Stories for Somebody was written when she was 35. She later wrote a number of animal stories for children. One series, Animal Life Readers, edited by Carrington and Ernest Bell was illustrated by Harrison Weir and others. She also ran a children's magazine called Our Animal Brothers.

Carrington died at the age of 75, on 23 January 1929 in Bristol. She was buried on 29 January in Alderholt, Dorset.

== Selected publications ==
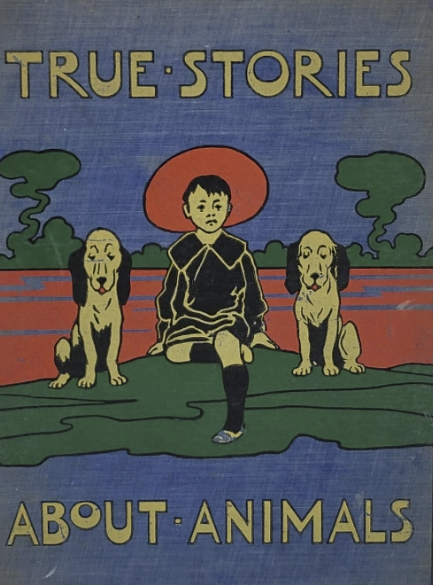
Front cover of Carrington's True Stories About Animals, 1905

- Stories for Somebody
- Nobody's Business (1891)
- Workers Without Wage (1893)
- Mrs Trimmer's History of the Robins and Keeper's Travels (1895)
- From Many Lands (1895)
- Dick and His Cat (1895)
- Spare the Sparrow (1897)
- Man's Helpers (1897)
- Wonderful Tools (1897)
- The Farmer and the Birds (1898)
- True Stories About Animals (1905)
- Nobody's Dog (1908)
- Flower Folk
- Friendship of Animals
- Ten Tales Without a Title
- Bread and Butter Stories
- Appeals on behalf of the Speechless: A Series of Tracts
- The Extermination of Birds
- A Narrow, Narrow World
- A Story of Wings
- Five Stars in a Little Pool
- The Dog: His Rights and Wrongs
- The Cat: Her Place in Society and Treatment
- Animals in the Wrong Place
- Anecdotes of Horses
- The Ass, his Welfare, Wants, and Woes
- Ages Ago
