= Animals' Friend Society (1910) =

British animal welfare organisation established in 1910

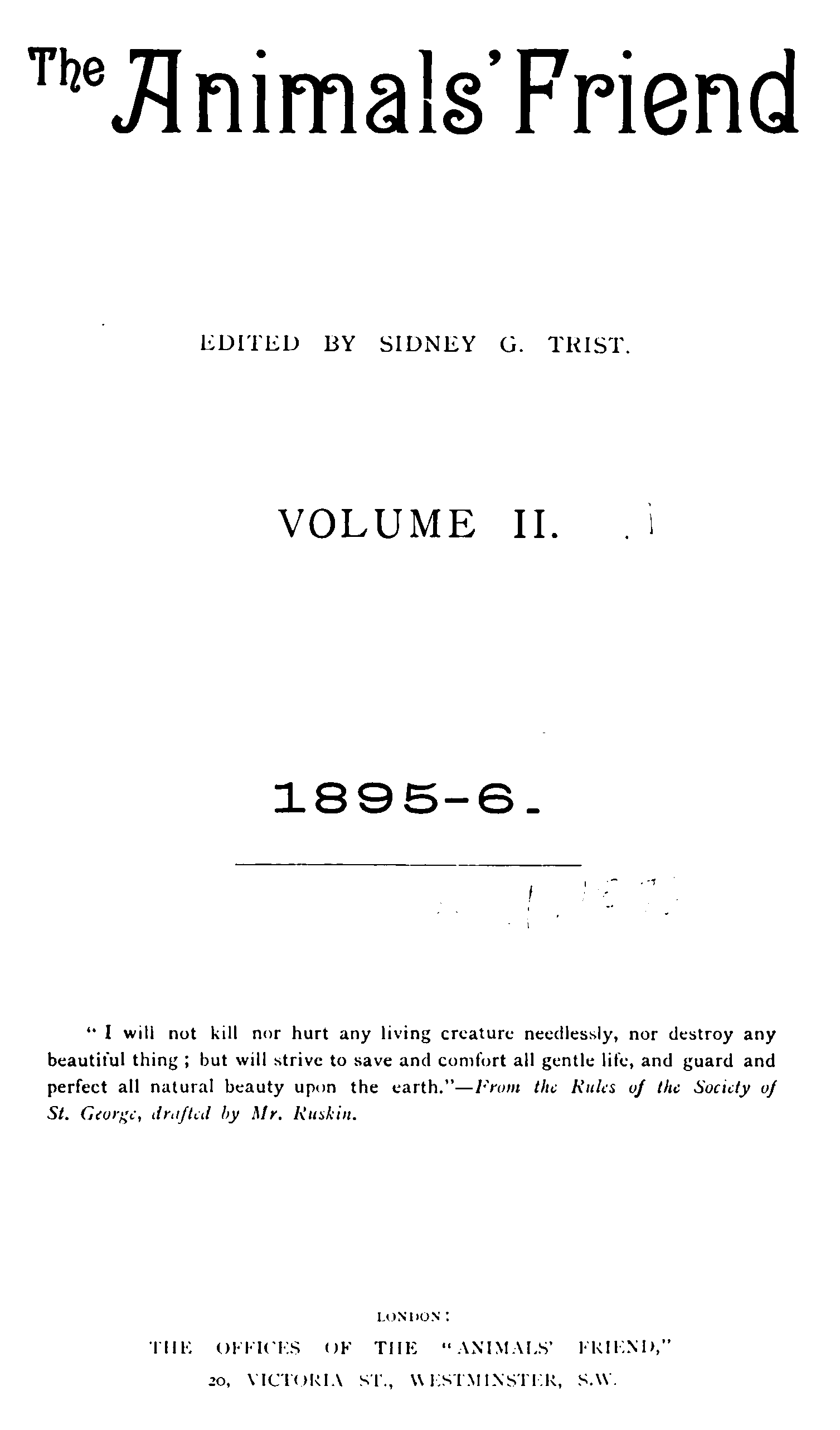
- Title page of The Animals' Friend (1896), which became the society's official journal in 1910
- Founded: 1910; 116 years ago
- Headquarters: York House, 6 Portugal Street, London
- Fields: Animal welfare
- Publication: The Animals' Friend

The Animals' Friend Society was a British animal welfare organisation established in London in 1910. It was separate from the society founded by Lewis Gompertz in 1832. The publisher and animal protection campaigner Ernest Bell served on its committee. His periodical The Animals' Friend, launched in 1894, became the society's official journal in 1910.

== History ==
The society's offices were at York House, 6 Portugal Street, London, also the premises of George Bell & Sons. In June 1927, the newly formed Cats Protection League was based at the Animals' Friend's Office at York House. A newspaper notice described its aims as preventing suffering among stray cats and providing temporary homes for cats during their owners' absence. The society declared its opposition to all forms of animal cruelty and made humane education a part of its work. It worked with George Bell & Sons to produce books and teaching materials. These included publications about animals' behaviour and mental abilities, intended to encourage more humane treatment. According to Li, novelist Thomas Hardy was among the society's supporters.

== Publications ==
=== The Animals' Friend ===
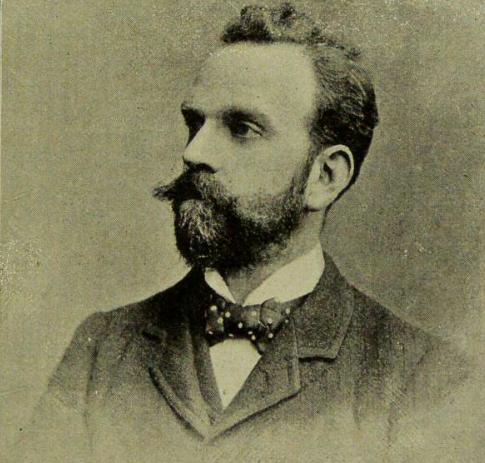
Ernest Bell, a committee member of the Animals' Friend Society and editor of The Animals' Friend

The Animals' Friend was launched in 1894 through the George Bell & Sons publishing business, before the foundation of the 1910 society. Ernest Bell was its long-serving editor. A Children's Supplement began in 1897 and was later known as Little Animals' Friend (1911–1944). Jessey Wade, Bell's personal secretary, became editor of the children's publication after Edith Carrington and contributed articles to The Animals' Friend. In 1910, the magazine became the society's official periodical. The society coordinated additional publications and teaching aids with Bell's firm.

The publishing company also produced Animal Life Readers and Life and Light Books, as well as illustrated kindness cards, posters and lantern slides for humane education.

The magazine printed articles opposing vivisection, including the series "Why I Oppose Vivisection" in 1895–1896, with contributions by Arthur Beale, John Makinson and Lawson Tait. Sidney Trist also edited the magazine.

Bell retired from the editorship in 1929 after more than thirty years. In October that year, Lady Clifford Cory presented him with a commemorative book bound in imitation leather with vegetable-parchment pages, at a meeting in Central Hall, Westminster. The National Council for Animals' Welfare published the magazine in 1930.

=== The "A. F." pamphlet series ===
The society issued the following pamphlets:

- An After-Life for Animals by Ernest Bell
- Animals in Their Relation to Empire by Mrs. Charlton
- Animals Under British Rule by Mrs. Charlton
- For Love of Beasts by John Galsworthy
- Bird-Caging and Bird-Catching by Ernest Bell
- Cruelties in Dress by Jessey Wade
- Cruelty to Animals in India by Mrs. Charlton
- Docking and Nicking by J. Lee Osborn
- Dog-Stealing by C. R. Johns
- Drag-Hunting and Its Possibilities by Basil Tozer
- Horse-Racing, a Cruel Sport by Ernest Bell
- Horses in Warfare by Ernest Bell and H. Baillie-Weaver
- How Sealskins Are Obtained by Joseph Collinson
- How to Kill Animals Humanely by Edith Carrington and C. Cash
- Humane Slaughtering, with a preface by R. C. P. Paddison
- Humane Teaching in Schools by J. Howard Moore
- The Hunted Otter by Joseph Collinson
- Morality of Field Sports by E. A. Freeman
- Mother Love in the Animal World by Jessey Wade
- The Other Side of the Bars
- The Pitiful Story of the Performing Animal by an Ex-Trainer, edited by C. R. Johns, with a preface by Ernest Bell
- A Plea for Horses in War by the Hon. Mrs. Charlton
- The Rights of Animals by Ernest Bell
- The Sentimental Vegetarian by M. Little
- Sport by G. G. Greenwood
- The Teaching of Inhumanity by Emily Cox
- Treatment of Animals by John Galsworthy
- Ways of Helping by Lettice Macnaghten
- Why Do Animals Exist? by Ernest Bell

=== "Animals' Friend" leaflets ===
The society issued the following leaflets:

- A Lethal Box for Cats, by Horace Snow
- Christmas Cheer: What it Means, by Ernest Bell
- The Chaining of Dogs, by Ernest Bell
- The Church and Cruel Sports, by Joseph Collinson
- The Collier's Dog, by Moses Lee
- The Cost of a Skin, by J. Howard Moore
- The Cruel Steel Trap, by Jerome K. Jerome
- Driving, by A. F. and C. Carter
- Egret Plumes, by William Dutcher
- Fur Coats, by Jessey Wade
- Guinea-Pigs and Wives, by G. G. Greenwood
- Hats and the Woman, by Jessey Wade
- The Horse's Prayer, also issued as a poster
- Horses in War, by Ernest Bell
- Humanity and Diet, by Ernest Bell
- Hunted for Seven Hours
- Is Horse Racing Cruel?, by Ernest Bell
- Is It Cruel to Keep Birds in Cages?, by Ernest Bell
- Juvenile Cruelty, by Ernest Bell
- Little Father Christmas, by Jessey Wade
- Mr Andrew Lang on Otter Hunting
- The Otter Worry, by Norman Gale
- Ostrich Feathers: A Dialogue, by Ernest Bell
- The Pitiless Hunt of the Otter, by Joseph Collinson
- Sealskins, by Joseph Collinson
- Tiny Dogs: How they are Manufactured, by Mrs Kenningale Cook
- Tortoiseshell: How it is Procured, by Ernest Bell
- What Are the Rights of Animals?, by Ernest Bell
- Winter Cruelties, by Jessey Wade
