= Henry B. Amos =

Scottish activist (1869–1946)

- Born: Henry Brown Amos; 24 May 1869; Tyninghame, Scotland
- Died: 22 October 1946 (aged 77); Hendon, England
- Occupations: Activist; draper
- Organizations: Humanitarian League; Vegetarian Federal Union; Vegetarian Cycling Club; Order of the Golden Age; Vegetarian Society; League for the Prohibition of Cruel Sports
- Spouse: Ruth Helen Bowker Sharp (m. 1899; died 1905)
- Children: 4

Henry Brown Amos (24 May 1869 – 22 October 1946) was a Scottish animal rights, vegetarian, humanitarian, anti-vivisection, and anti-blood sports activist. He worked as a draper and held offices in several vegetarian and animal protection organisations. In 1925, he co-founded the League for the Prohibition of Cruel Sports.

== Biography ==
=== Early life and family ===
Amos was born in Tyninghame, Scotland, on 24 May 1869. He first became interested in vegetarianism when he was a teenager, in about 1886. He later worked as a draper.

On 7 February 1899, Amos married Ruth Helen Bowker Sharp (1869–1905). They had four children, two of whom died in infancy.

=== Vegetarian and humanitarian work ===
Amos was a member of the Humanitarian League and a former member of the RSPCA. In the mid-1890s, he was an organiser in London for the Vegetarian Federal Union. In 1895, he was honorary secretary of the Vegetarian Cycling Club. He was also associated with Sidney H. Beard and the Order of the Golden Age from 1901 to 1903. From 1913 to 1914, he succeeded Albert Broadbent as secretary of the Vegetarian Society.

In 1915, Amos published Economical, Nourishing Dishes for Times of Stress and How to Cook Them, a short pamphlet on cooking vegetarian meals.

=== Opposition to blood sports ===
Amos opposed blood sports. His letters campaigning against rabbit coursing in Surrey led to its prohibition in 1924. He organised the Leeds Rodeo Protest Committee in the same year.

In 1925, Amos co-founded the League for the Prohibition of Cruel Sports, later the League Against Cruel Sports, with Ernest Bell and George Greenwood as its first president. The League sought to end the hunting of deer, foxes, hares and otters, and the coursing of hares and rabbits.

Amos criticised the RSPCA for declining to campaign against hunting. His criticism caused disputes within the League; Greenwood resigned from the organisation in 1927, and Bell resigned in 1931.

The League published a monthly journal, Cruel Sports, which Amos edited. According to E. S. Turner, the journal "criticised the RSPCA for its toleration of fox-hunting, and attacked the Church for sheltering behind the RSPCA." In the January 1927 edition, Amos wrote that "little has been done either by religion or education to stem the tide of cruelty involved in hunting."

In 1935, Amos was briefly imprisoned after throwing a copy of Henry Stephens Salt's Creed of Kinship through a stained glass window at Exeter Cathedral during evensong. The protest was directed at the Church's support for hunting.

=== Later life and death ===
Amos suffered for years from a bronchial illness. He retired from his work with the League at the end of 1936.

Amos died in Hendon, north London, on 22 October 1946, aged 77.

== Publications ==
- The Food Reformer's Year Book and Health Annual (editor for multiple years, 1909)
- Economical, Nourishing Dishes for Times of Stress and How to Cook Them (1915)
- Opinions in Favour of Vegetarianism by Leading Temperance Reformers (1919)
