= John Stuart Verschoyle =

Irish clergyman and journalist

- Born: 1853; Saggart
- Died: 30 July 1915 (aged 61–62); Taunton
- Occupation: Clergyman

John Stuart Verschoyle (1853 – 30 July 1915) was an Irish clergyman, editor and journalist. He was assistant editor of The Fortnightly Review and authored the first biography of Cecil Rhodes.

== Career ==
Verschoyle was born in Saggart. He graduated from Pembroke College, Cambridge in 1880 and was ordained in 1881. He was curate of Holy Trinity Church, Marylebone from 1881 to 1891, rector of Creeting St Peter from 1891 to 1893 and of Huish Champflower from 1893 to 1915.

Verschoyle met Frank Harris and worked as his advisor and confidant. He was the official assistant editor of The Fortnightly Review from 1889 to 1891. Verschoyle was known for his biographies and memoirs. He wrote under the pseudonym "Imperialist" and was the first to author a full length biography of Cecil Rhodes in 1897. In 1900, under the pseudonym "Vindex" he authored Cecil Rhodes: His Political Life and Speeches, 1881-1900.

He took interest in the history of ancient civilizations.

== Animal welfare ==
Verschoyle was a staunch opponent of vivisection and was an active member of the British Union for the Abolition of Vivisection. He was editor of The Abolitionist.

Verschoyle campaigned to abolish private slaughterhouses and establish public abattoirs. He served on the committee of the London Model Abattoir Society. His article "Slaughter-House Reform" from the Humane Review was republished by the Humanitarian League as a pamphlet in 1901. In 1906, Verschoyle was a committee member of a presentation in honour of Walter Hadwen at Charing Cross, the headquarters of the British Union for the Abolition of Vivisection.

== Death ==
Verschoyle died at a nursing home in Taunton in July 1915.

== Selected publications ==
- The History of Ancient Civilization. London: Chapman and Hall. 1889.
- Cecil Rhodes: A Biography and Appreciation by Imperialist with Personal Reminiscences by Dr Jameson. London: Chapman and Hall. 1897.
- Cecil Rhodes: His Political Life and Speeches, 1881-1900. London: Chapman and Hall. 1900.
- Slaughter-House Reform. London: Humanitarian League. 1901.
