= The Kingdom of God Is Within You =

1894 philosophical treatise by Leo Tolstoy

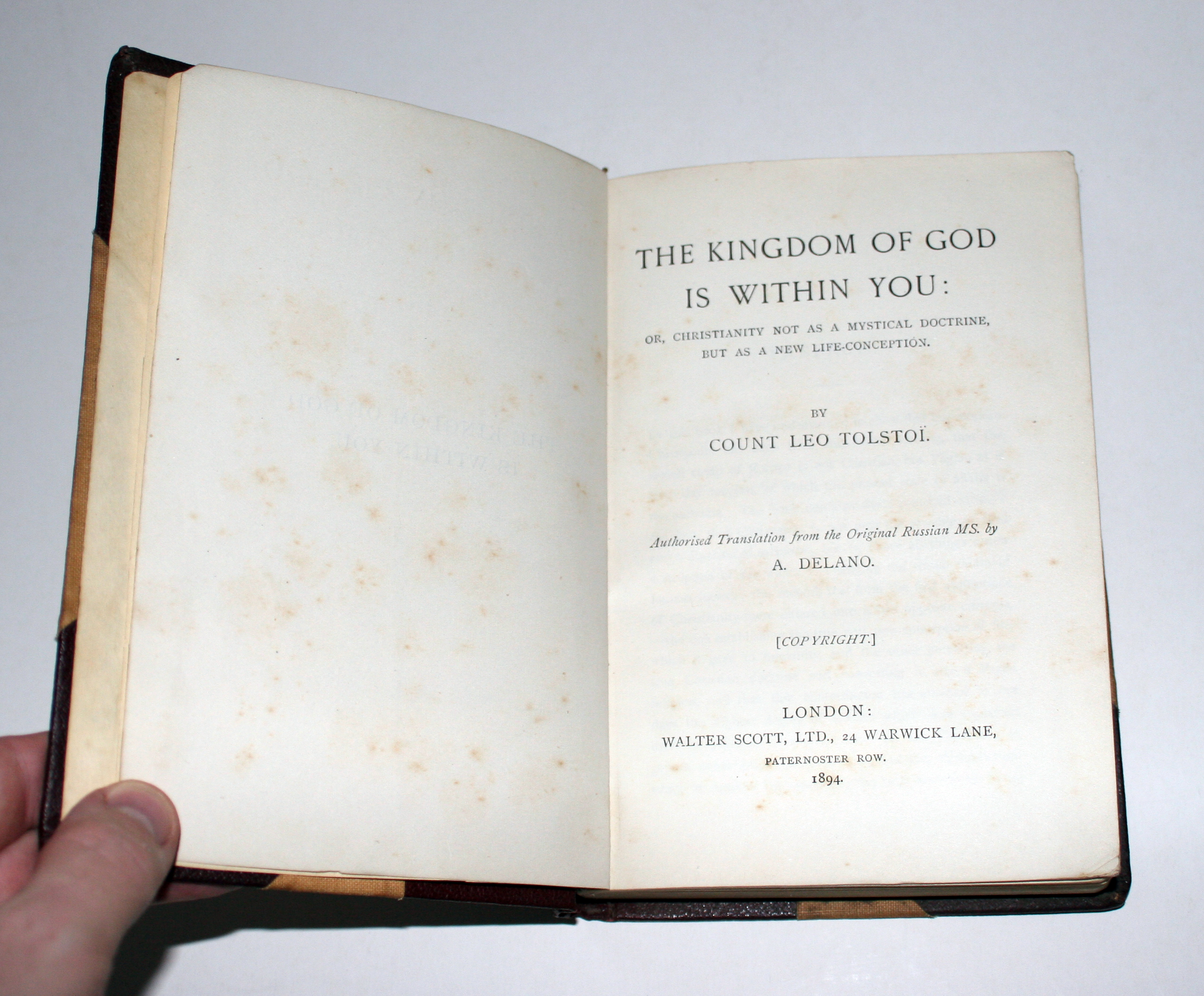
- The first English edition of The Kingdom of God Is Within You
- Author: Leo Tolstoy
- Original title: Царство Божіе внутри васъ
- Language: Russian
- Subject: Christian theology, philosophy, anarchism
- Published: 1894
- Publication place: Russia (written); Germany (first published)
- Media type: Hardcover, Paperback
- Pages: 335 pages (1927 edition, hardcover)
- ISBN: 1603863826
- Text: The Kingdom of God Is Within You at Wikisource

The Kingdom of God Is Within You (pre-reform Russian: Царство Божіе внутри васъ; post-reform Russian: Царство Божие внутри вас, romanized: Tsárstvo Bózhiye vnutrí vas) is a non-fiction book written by Leo Tolstoy. A Christian anarchist philosophical treatise, the book was first published in Germany in 1894 after being banned in his home country of Russia. It is the culmination of 30 years of Tolstoy's thinking and lays out a new organization for society based on an interpretation of Christianity focusing on universal love.

The Kingdom of God Is Within You is a key text for Tolstoyan proponents of nonviolence, of nonviolent resistance, and of the Christian anarchist movement.

== Background ==
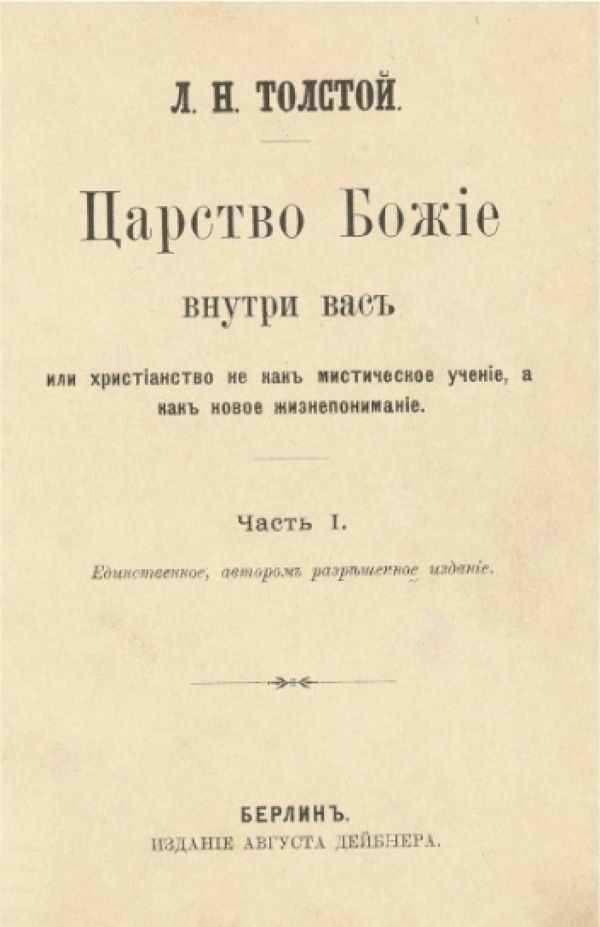
The first edition of The Kingdom of God Is Within You, 1894

The title of the book is a reference to Luke 17:21. In the book, Tolstoy speaks of the principle of nonviolent resistance when confronted by violence, as taught by Jesus Christ. When Christ says to turn the other cheek, Tolstoy asserts that Christ means to abolish violence, even the defensive kind, and to give up revenge. Tolstoy rejects the interpretation of Roman and medieval scholars who attempted to limit its scope.

"How can you kill people, when it is written in God's commandment: 'Thou shalt not murder'?"

Tolstoy was largely inspired by the writings of American Christian anarchists Adin Ballou and William Lloyd Garrison, who also shared his viewpoint that all governments who waged war were an affront to the New Testament and Christian ethics. Tolstoy discusses Ballou and Garrison's texts and biographies at length in the book, including a whole excerpt of Ballou's Non-Resistance Catechism (originally published in 1844). As the Russian Orthodox Church was at the time an organization merged with the Russian state which was completely subservient to the state's policies, Tolstoy sought to separate its teachings from what he believed to be the true gospel of Christ, specifically the Sermon on the Mount.

Tolstoy advocated nonviolence as a solution to nationalist woes and as a means for seeing the hypocrisy of the church. In reading Jesus' words in the Gospels, Tolstoy notes that the modern church is a heretical creation:

Nowhere nor in anything, except in the assertion of the Church, can we find that God or Christ founded anything like what churchmen understand by the Church.

Tolstoy presented excerpts from magazines and newspapers relating various personal experiences, and gave keen insight into the history of non-resistance from the very foundation of Christianity, as being professed by a minority of believers. In particular, he confronts those who seek to maintain status quo:

That this social order with its pauperism, famines, prisons, gallows, armies, and wars is necessary to society; that still greater disaster would ensue if this organization were destroyed; all this is said only by those who profit by this organization, while those who suffer from it – and they are ten times as numerous – think and say quite the contrary.

In 1894, Constance Garnett, who translated the work into English, wrote the following in her translator's preface:

One cannot of course anticipate that English people, slow as they are to be influenced by ideas, and instinctively distrustful of all that is logical, will take a leap in the dark and attempt to put Tolstoy's theory of life into practice. But one may at least be sure that his destructive criticism of the present social and political regime will become a powerful force in the work of disintegration and social reconstruction which is going on around us.

== Reception ==
=== Tolstoy's relationship with Mohandas Gandhi ===
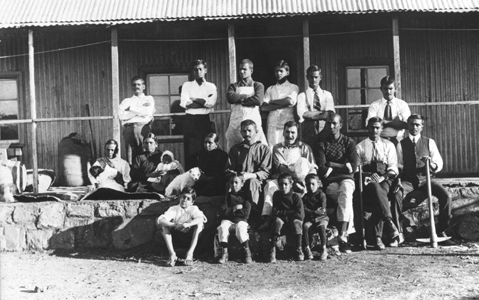
Mohandas K. Gandhi and other residents of Tolstoy Farm (a colony established as part of the Tolstoyan movement), South Africa, 1910

Mohandas Gandhi wrote in his autobiography The Story of My Experiments with Truth (Part II, Chapter 15) that Tolstoy's book "overwhelmed" him, and "left an abiding impression". Gandhi listed Tolstoy's book, as well as John Ruskin's Unto This Last and the poet Shrimad Rajchandra (Raychandbhai), as the three most important modern influences in his life. Reading this book opened up the mind of the world-famous Tolstoy to Gandhi, who was still a young protester living in South Africa at the time.

In 1908, Tolstoy wrote A Letter to a Hindu, which Gandhi would read, and which outlined the notion that only by using love as a weapon through passive resistance could the native Indian people overthrow the colonial British Empire. This idea ultimately came to fruition through Gandhi's organization of nationwide nonviolent strikes and protests during the years 1918–1947. In 1909, Gandhi wrote to Tolstoy seeking advice and permission to republish A Letter to a Hindu in his native language, Gujarati. Tolstoy responded and the two continued a correspondence until Tolstoy's death a year later in 1910. The letters concern practical and theological applications of nonviolence, as well as Gandhi's wishes for Tolstoy's health. Tolstoy's last letter to Gandhi "was one of the last, if not the last, writings from his pen."

=== With other nonviolent activists ===
In 1894, The Kingdom of God is Within You inspired the soldier Arthur St. John to become a pacifist. It also had a great effect upon James Bevel, a major 1960s strategist of the civil rights movement. After reading the book while serving in the U.S. Navy, Bevel came to the conclusion that he would be unable to kill another person. He thereafter sought and was granted an honorable discharge, and entered a seminary for religious training.

==== Importance of Jesus' words ====
"The Kingdom of God is Within You" is the key phrase in Luke 17:21 which furthers the idea of nonviolence. Jesus said, "for, behold, the kingdom of God is within you" in response to the Pharisees asking when the Kingdom of God will come. The saying has numerous explanations including that enlightenment is within oneself, in one's heart, and one's spark of God has always been there. Therefore only a nonviolent, peaceful nature will result in nonviolent, peaceful, Kingdom of God outcomes.

== See also ==
- Leo Tolstoy bibliography
- Adin Ballou
- Divine presence
- Kingdom of God
- The Gospel in Brief
- List of books about anarchism
