= Joseph Collinson =

English humanitarian and journalist

- Born: 11 November 1871; Wolsingham
- Died: 24 August 1952 (aged 80)
- Occupation: Journalist
- Spouse: Jessie Humble (m. 1896)

Joseph Collinson (11 November 1871 – 24 August 1952) was an English humanitarian, journalist and animal rights campaigner.

== Biography ==
Collinson was born at Wolsingham. He became interested in humanitarian issues, prison reform punishments, vaccination, vivisection and cruelties of the seal fishery. He took part in activism which led to the rejection of the Flogging Bill in 1900. In 1906, Collinson campaigned to outlaw birching in the Royal Navy. He was honorary secretary of the Humanitarian League's Criminal Law and Prison Reform Committee for thirteen years. Henry Stephens Salt described Collinson as a "north-countryman, self-taught, and full of native readiness and ingenuity, who at an early age had developed a passion for humanitarian journalism".

Collinson was an opponent of vaccination and vivisection. He married Jessie Humble in 1896.

== Animal activism ==
Collinson was an advocate of animal rights who supported improving animal welfare legislation. In 1896, he commented that "in the sense that men have rights, animals have their rights, though in a smaller degree". This included the right of a "restricted freedom", so that animals can live a "natural life in harmony with the requirements of the community". He criticized the selective nature of animal welfare legislation, suggesting that "it is inconsistent to include some animals within the pale of protection, and not certain others, quite as intelligent".

Collinson was a member of the Animals' Friend Society and authored pamphlets on animal rights and welfare issues. In 1900, he denounced cruelty against turtles where they were hung over burning leaves to remove their shells. In his 1902 pamphlet The Cruel Treatment of Fish, he commented that there is "no justification whatever for such wanton treatment of fish – not even the base one of utility... humane treatment would financially benefit the trader".

Collinson was secretary of the Indian Humanitarian League. In 1907, he sent a letter to John Morley Secretary of State for India complaining about the torture of buffaloes, goats and sheep during religious ceremonies. In 1910, he authored How Sealskins Are Obtained which compared the suffering of seals to animals in Chicago slaughterhouses where "there seems to be no doubt that pigs are scraped alive".

In 1911, Collinson authored The Hunted Otter, the first pamphlet solely based on exposing the cruelty of otter hunting. He described otter hunting as a "brutal and disgusting sport". Part of the pamphlet was published by the League Against Cruel Sports in their Cruel Sports magazine in 1929.

He pushed for legislation to protect skylarks from slaughter, stating that thousands were being killed in the countryside to satisfy the appetite of greedy consumers. He argued that the only way to end such "barbarous butchery" was to extend the Wild Birds Protection Act. In 1912, Collinson wrote a letter to the Press calling attention to the "selfish and cruel spirit of the gunner and collector" who were killing British birds for the taxidermy market. In 1915, he advocated for a vegetarian diet consisting of beans, cheese, eggs, lentils, oatmeal, peas, potatoes and rice.

== Selected publications ==
- What it Costs to be Vaccinated: The Pains and Penalties of an Unjust Law. Humanitarian League. 1896.
- The Cruel Treatment of Fish. Humanitarian League. 1902.
- Facts about Flogging. A. C. Fifield. 1905.
- The Fate of the Fur Seal. Humanitarian League. 1909.
- How Sealskins Are Obtained. Animals' Friend Society. 1910.
- The Hunted Otter. Animals' Friend Society. 1911.
