= Edward Maitland (writer) =

English writer and occultist (1824–1897)

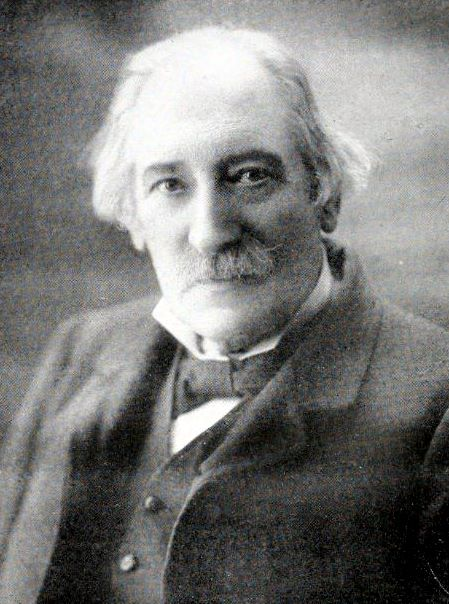
- Born: 27 October 1824; Ipswich, England
- Died: 2 October 1897 (aged 72); Tonbridge, England
- Education: Caius College, Cambridge
- Writing career
- Literary movement: Theosophy

Edward Maitland (27 October 1824 – 2 October 1897) was an English humanitarian writer and occultist.

== Biography ==
Edward Maitland was born in Ipswich on 27 October 1824, and was the son of Charles David Maitland, perpetual curate of St. James's Chapel, Brighton; he was the nephew of General Sir Peregrine Maitland, and brother of Brownlow Maitland and Charles Maitland (1815–1866). His father was a noted preacher, and Edward Maitland was brought up among strict evangelical ideas, and rigorous theories about original sin and atonement.

After education at a large private school in Brighton, he was admitted as a pensioner at Caius College, Cambridge, on 19 April 1843, and graduated B.A. in 1847. He was destined by his family for the pulpit but was diverted from taking orders by doubts as to faith and vocation, and by the feeling that the church was rather "a tomb for the preservation of embalmed doctrines" than a living organism. In his perplexity, he got a leave of absence from his home for a year and left England. He went in 1849 to California, became one of the band of 'forty-niners,' and remained abroad, on the shores of the Pacific, mainly in America and Australia, where he became a commissioner of crown lands until the one year of absence had grown into nine. He married in Australia but was left a widower with one son, after a year of wedlock.

Returning to England at the end of 1857, he devoted himself to literature, with the dominant aim of

so developing the intuitional faculty to find the solution to all problems having their basis in man's spiritual nature, with a view to the formulation of a perfect system of thought and rule of life.

Many of the vicissitudes of his life, both physical and mental, were recorded with but little distortion in his romance called The Pilgrim and the Shrine. From the Life and Correspondence of Herbert Ainslie, B.A. Cantab., which was published in 1867, and warmly acclaimed by thoughtful critics. It was followed by a romance called The Higher Law (1869), which represents the escape of a youth from the trammels, no longer of orthodox religion, but of traditional morals. Maitland became a figure in society, and was appreciated highly by Lord Houghton and Sir Francis Hastings Doyle. He began to write in the Spectator and Examiner, and did some reviewing for the 'Athenæum' from 1870 onwards. His book By and By: an Historical Romance of the Future (1873) led to his making the acquaintance of Anna Kingsford, whom he visited at her husband's vicarage of Atcham, in Shropshire, in February 1874. In conjunction with her, he produced anonymously, in 1875, The Keys of the Creeds. At the close of 1874 his mother died at Brighton, and Maitland accompanied Mrs. Kingsford to Paris. He joined her crusade against materialism, animal food, and vivisection, upon which subject he wrote a forcible letter in the Examiner in June 1876, which attracted the most widespread attention to the subject. In this same year, he first saw the apparition of his father, who had then been ten years dead, and he soon afterward recognised that he 'belonged to the order of the mystics.'

In 1876, Maitland informs us that he acquired a new sense, that of 'a spiritual sensitiveness,' using which he opened relations with the church invisible of the spiritual world. He was able to see the spiritual condition of people. In a state of mind that must have approximated that of William Blake, he tells us that he saw upon one occasion the soul of a tree. He could also, he asseverated, recall the memory of some of his past lives. He was told through a sensitivity that these had been many, that he had lived in trees and animals, and that he had been a prince. He 'remembered' a life lived in ancient Thebes; he believed that he had been Marcus Aurelius and St. John the Evangelist. St. John, he believed, was a reincarnation of the prophet Daniel.

In 1881, before a highly fashionable audience, he gave a series of lectures upon his new or, as he affirmed, revived esoteric creed; these lectures formed the groundwork of his 'revelation,' in which Anna Kingsford collaborated, The Perfect Way; or, the Finding of Christ, 1882 (revised 1887 and 1890). By publishing this in his name he admits that he cut himself off from his old friendships and all his literary and social ambitions. A striking parallel is afforded by the later life of Laurence Oliphant, with whom Maitland had a good deal in common, though he was constrained to express dissent from the spiritualistic theories embodied in 'Sympneumata.'

Maitland joined the Theosophical Society about 1883, but the vagaries of Madame Blavatsky soon compelled him to secede from the 'London Lodge,' and in May 1884, in collaboration with Mrs. Kingsford, he founded the Hermetic Society, of mystic rather than occult character, claiming no abnormal powers, and 'depending for guidance upon no Mahatmas.' In 1885, with some help from 'Anna,' he rendered into English the Minerva Mundi and other hermetic writings of Hermes Trismegistus. In 1886, he and Mrs. Kingsford visited Madame Blavatsky at Ostend, but refused to be inveigled back into the theosophical fold.

Maitland was a spiritualist. He joined the London Spiritualist Alliance in March, 1884. He was a vegetarian.

After the death of Anna Kingsford, in February 1888, Maitland lived alone at 1 Thurloe Square Studios, London, where he professed to receive continual 'illumination' from his former collaborator. In 1891, he helped found the Humanitarian League, with Henry S. Salt. Henceforth he devoted his main energies to an elaborate record of their singular partnership and co-operation, though he still found time to do a certain amount of journalistic work, and in November 1891, in response to astral intimations, he founded the Esoteric Christian Union. He corresponded with Gandhi, who in 1894, became South Africa's Esoteric Christian Union agent. Maitland was also the one who introduced Gandhi to Tolstoy's The Kingdom of God Is Within You, a book which "overwhelmed" Gandhi and led him toward nonviolence as a means to change. Gandhi and Maitland corresponded until the latter's death.

His later works were Clothed with the Sun, being the Book of the Illuminations of Anna (Bonus) Kingsford, 1889; The New Gospel of Interpretation, 1892; and Anna Kingsford. Her Life, Letters, Diary, and Work. By her Collaborator . . . with a Supplement of Post-mortem Communications, 2 vols. 1896. After the conclusion of this last, which he regarded as his magnum opus, Maitland's physical and mental decline was remarkably rapid. In 1896, he went to reside with Colonel Currie at The Warders, Tonbridge, and he lost the power of speech some months before his death, on 2 October 1897.

Maitland was buried in Tonbridge cemetery on 5 October, by his wife Esther, who died in Australia, he left a son, a surgeon-major in the Bombay medical service.

== Selected publications ==
- 1875 – The Keys of the Creeds
- 1877 – The Soul, and How It Found Me
- 1882 – The Perfect Way; or, the Finding of Christ
- 1891 – The Bible’s Own Account of Itself
- 1892 – THE “NEW GOSPEL OF INTERPRETATION”: Being an Abstract of the Doctrine and a Statement of the Origin, Object, Basis, Method and Scope of the Esoteric Christian Union
- 1893 – The Story of Anna Kingsford and Edward Maitland and of the New Gospel of Interpretation
- 1896 – Anna Kingsford – Her Life, Letters, Diary and Work
- 1912 – Addresses and Essays on Vegetarianism
- 1916 – The Credo of Christendom: and Other Addresses and Essays on Esoteric Christianity
