= Louis Kuhne =

German naturopath (1835–1901)

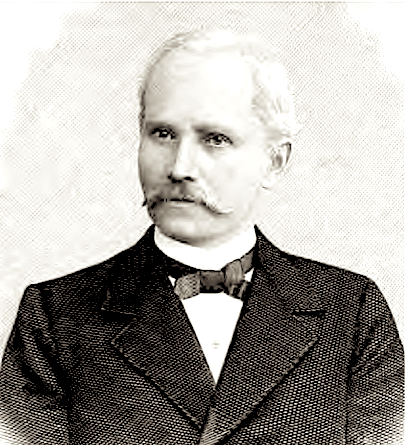
- Born: 14 March 1835
- Died: 4 April 1901 (aged 66)
- Occupation: Naturopath

Louis Kuhne (14 March 1835 – 4 April 1901) was a German naturopath primarily known for his cold water hydrotherapy methods that were meant to improve detoxification functions of the body by stimulation of the lower abdomen.

== Biography ==
Kuhne was a strict vegetarian and forbade his patients the use of salt, fine flour and sugar in the diet. His conceptual view of the cause for disease was that the average human body was overburdened with toxins that eventually led to degenerations of the internal organs. He stressed the importance of proper digestion and of avoiding constipation.

Kuhne's friction sitz bath and hip baths both involved the patient sitting in a tub filled with relatively cold water (about 10–14 °C (50–57 °F) for the friction bath in the original instructions, although slightly higher temperatures are preferred today) and rubbing the lower abdomen, hips, or genitals with a rough linen cloth. The resulting nerve stimulation by the cold water was supposed to help eliminate toxins. Immediately after the bath the patient is put to bed to warm him up again.

== Books by Kuhne ==
- The New Science of Healing (1899) — LCCN 29-11154
- The Science of Facial Expression (1917) — LCCN 27-2493
