= William Lisle Blenkinsopp Coulson =

English army officer and animal welfare campaigner (1840–1911)

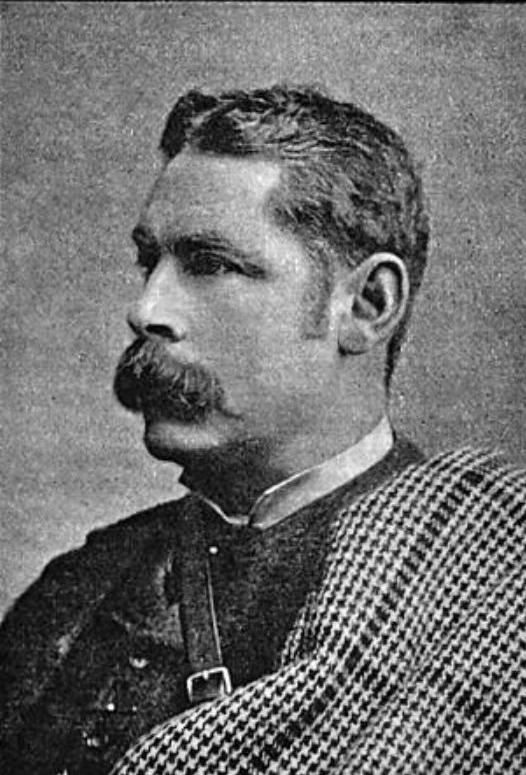
- Coulson in 1904
- Born: 3 July 1840; Haltwhistle, Northumberland, England
- Died: 1 June 1911 (aged 70); Newbrough, Northumberland, England
- Occupations: Army officer, lecturer, writer
- Known for: Campaigning for animal welfare
- Spouse: Sophia Lydia Dixon (m. 1877)
- Children: 2

William Lisle Blenkinsopp Coulson (3 July 1840 – 1 June 1911) was an English army officer and campaigner for animal welfare. He was a notable supporter of the Humanitarian League. After his death, he was memorialised by a statue in Newcastle upon Tyne.

== Life and work ==
Coulson was a member of a landowning Northumberland family, most of whose country estates were sold in 1876 to Edward Joicey. Between 1877 and 1880, he had Blenkinsopp Castle, a disused property dating originally to the 14th-century, renovated in the Victorian style. Blenkinsopp Castle was later sold to Joicey. For some years, he owned and resided at the nearby Blenkinsop Hall estate.

He served in the army from 1860 to 1892, attaining the rank of colonel. After retiring from the army, he became a magistrate and served on the boards of many charities concerned with the welfare of children and animals. Described by Henry S. Salt as "one of the first men of standing who lent their support to the Humanitarian League", he chaired its first public meeting. Coulson visited schools throughout England, lecturing about the importance of kindness to animals.

In the 1890s, he participated in the Humanitarian League's campaign against otter hunting, which he characterised as "a brutal, demoralizing amusement". He wrote letters on the subject to local, regional and national newspapers and contributed an article on "The Otter-Worry" to a Humanitarian League pamphlet about blood sports. Among his other publications were a pamphlet on the horse and Musings on Moor and Fell, a book of local and natural history.

After Coulson's death, in 1911, Henry S. Salt stated that "no one has done nobler service in a more unassuming way than Colonel Coulson [for the cause of animal welfare]".

== Memorial statue ==
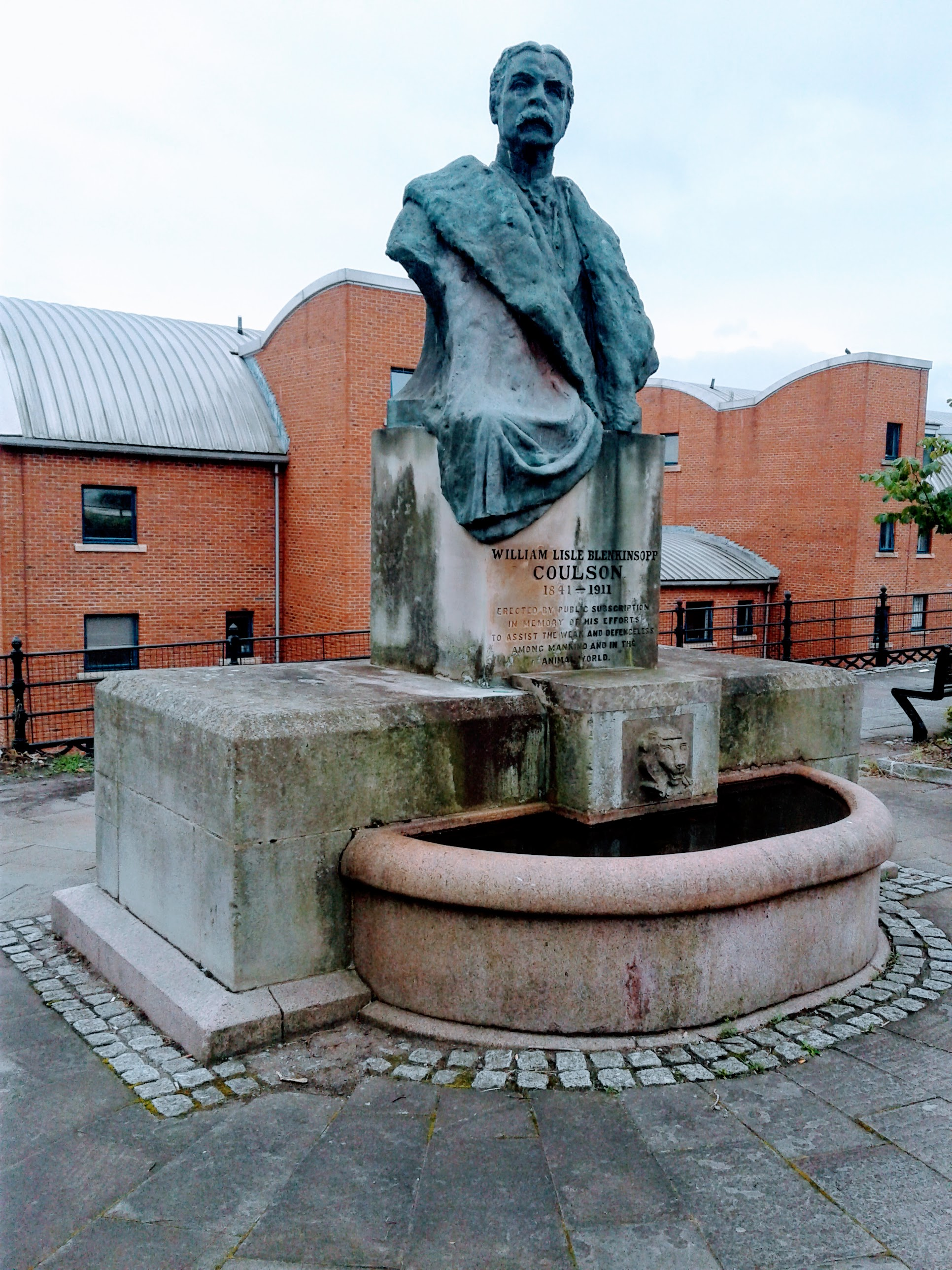
The Coulson memorial

Soon after Coulson's death, in 1911, the First Secretary to the British Embassy in Paris, George Graham, proposed the building of a memorial in Newcastle upon Tyne. He volunteered to donate £300 toward the project, which he suggested should be a drinking trough for cattle with a portrait medallion of Coulson. A Memorial Fund Committee was struck to raise the necessary funds. The committee determined that the memorial should be erected in the Haymarket. It was unveiled by the Lord Mayor on 27 May 1914. In 1950 the memorial was moved to its present location on the junction of Horatio Road and City Road overlooking the Quayside and the River Tyne. It is a Grade II listed structure.

The memorial consists of a double life size bronze portrait bust of Coulson on a concrete and stone pedestal which in turn stands on a pink granite base with drinking troughs - one for cattle and horses and the other for dogs - at the front and back. The bronze bust was sculpted by Arnold Rechberg and cast by the Rudier Foundry in France. The pedestal is inscribed on the front: "William Lisle Blenkinsopp Coulson, 1841 (Note: Coulson's actual year of birth was 1840.)–1911. Erected by public subscription in memory of his efforts to assist the weak and defenceless among mankind and in the animal world." On the back of the pedestal is inscribed a quotation from Coulson:

What is really needed is an all round education in the higher impulses, true manliness and womanliness, justice and pity. To try to promote this has been my humble but earnest endeavour and until they are more generally aroused the legislature is useless, for it is the people who make the laws. W.L.B.C
