= Ernest Bell (activist) =

English publisher and social reformer (1851–1933)

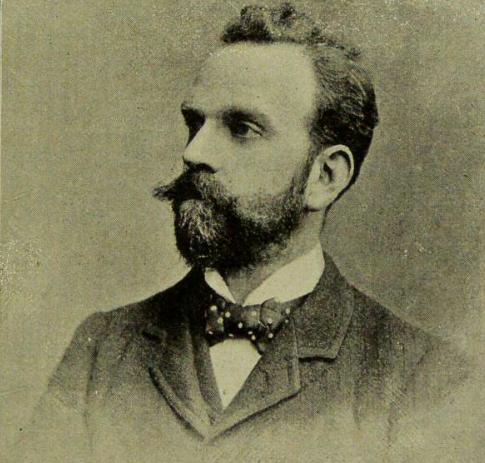
- Bell in Fifty Years of Food Reform (1898)
- Born: 8 March 1851; Hampstead, Middlesex, England
- Died: 14 September 1933 (aged 82); Hendon, Middlesex, England
- Resting place: St Mary's Churchyard, Hendon
- Education: St Paul's School, London; Trinity College, Cambridge (B.A., 1873; M.A., 1876)
- Occupations: Publisher; writer; social reformer
- Employer: George Bell & Sons
- Known for: Animal and vegetarianism advocacy; co-founding the League Against Cruel Sports
- Spouses: Wilhelmina E. Wölfel (m. 1875; died 1881) Marie Anna von Taysen (m. 1893)
- Children: 1
- Father: George Bell
- Awards: Joint recognition by 22 animal organisations (1929)

Ernest Bell (8 March 1851 – 14 September 1933) was an English publisher and social reformer who campaigned for animal rights, animal welfare and vegetarianism. He worked for the family firm George Bell & Sons, becoming a partner in 1888 and its chairman in 1926. He edited The Animals' Friend and published works on animal protection and vegetarianism.

Bell served on the committee of the Animals' Friend Society, established in 1910, and was president of the Vegetarian Society from 1914 until his death. He was active in the Humanitarian League and anti-vivisection organisations, and helped found the League Against Cruel Sports in 1925. In 1929, 22 animal protection organisations jointly honoured him for his work. The Ernest Bell Library was established after his death to preserve his writings and other reform literature.

== Biography ==
=== Early life and education ===
Ernest Bell was born on 8 March 1851 at West Croft, England's Lane, Hampstead, the second son of the publisher George Bell (1814–1890) and his wife, Hannah Bell (née Simpson; d. 1875). He attended St Paul's School, London and entered Trinity College, Cambridge in 1869. He graduated with a B.A. in 1873 and an M.A. in 1876. He also spent time in Dresden learning German.

=== Publishing career ===
Bell worked for much of his life at his father's publishing firm, George Bell & Sons, in London, and became a partner in 1888. He translated German works for Bohn's Standard Library and edited the All England Series of Athletic Sports. According to Virginia Smith in the Oxford Dictionary of National Biography, Bell was the first English publisher to take an interest in the works and followers of Ralph Waldo Emerson.

From the 1890s, the firm published works for the Vegetarian Society and Humanitarian League. Bell succeeded his brother Edward as chairman of George Bell & Sons in 1926. His publications included The Animals' Friend (1904), an illustrated book, and In a Nutshell: Cons and Pros of the Meatless Diet (1920). He edited the periodical The Animals' Friend and the Animal Life Readers, a series of books for schools.

=== Animal activism ===
Bell joined the RSPCA in 1873. From 1893, he devoted much of his time to administering and raising funds for animal protection, vegetarian and humanitarian organisations.

He was honorary secretary of the Hampstead Society for the Prevention of Cruelty to Animals for thirty years and chairman of the National Anti-Vivisection Society. He also served on the governing councils of the Royal Society for the Protection of Birds, the National Canine Defence League (now Dogs Trust), the Cats Protection League, the Pit-Ponies Protection Society and the Anti-Bearing Rein Association.

Bell was a committee member of the Animals' Friend Society, established in 1910. It was separate from the earlier society established by Lewis Gompertz. The society adopted The Animals' Friend, the periodical Bell had launched in 1894, as its journal. Its offices were at York House, Portugal Street, London.

In 1925, Bell and Henry B. Amos established the League for the Prohibition of Cruel Sports, with George Greenwood as its first president and Bell as honorary treasurer. In 1929, he received a lifetime award presented jointly by 22 animal protection organisations.

An early member of the Humanitarian League, Bell was its chairman and treasurer for more than twenty years. He worked with Henry Stephens Salt and Jessey Wade, who was his secretary until his death.

=== Vegetarianism ===
In 1874, Bell adopted a vegetarian diet after reading T. L. Nichols' pamphlet How to Live on Sixpence a Day. In a 1925 interview, he stated that he had been a vegetarian for fifty years and attributed his continued good health to a meat-free diet. He also argued that wider adoption of vegetarianism would reduce chronic disease.

Bell became a vice-president of the Vegetarian Society in 1896 and was its president from 1914 until his death in 1933. He wrote the preface to E. W. Bowdich's vegetarian cookbook New Vegetarian Dishes in 1892, and was a regular speaker at Vegetarian Society meetings. He stated that meat eating was unethical, and argued that animals could not receive moral consideration or rights while they were treated as food.

=== Personal life and death ===
On 10 April 1875, Bell married Wilhelmina E. Wölfel (Note: Her name is also recorded as Elize Wilhelmina Wolfel and Elise Wilhelmina.) of Dresden at St Saviour's Church, Hampstead. They had one daughter. Wilhelmina appears to have died in 1881. In 1893, Bell married Marie Anna von Taysen. They apparently had no children together.

Bell believed that animals have souls and survive death. In his pamphlet An Afterlife for Animals, he wrote about an alleged encounter with a ghost dog that had been investigated by the Society for Psychical Research.

Bell died on 14 September 1933, aged 82, at his home, Althorpe, Waverley Grove, Hendon. His funeral took place at St Mary's Churchyard, Hendon, two days later and was attended by his widow, other family members, and representatives from organisations including the Vegetarian Society, National Anti-Vivisection Society, National Canine Defence League, National Council for Animals' Welfare and the Cats Protection League. Obituaries and tributes appeared in Animal World and The Vegetarian Messenger and Health Review, and were also written by Henry B. Amos and Stephen Coleridge.

== Ernest Bell Library ==
A library to preserve Bell's writings, known as the Ernest Bell Library, was proposed by Henry S. Salt in 1934 and established by the executive of the Vegetarian Society in 1936. The library contains more than 1,500 books, journals, magazines and newspapers. It is currently cared for by The Humanitarian League, a Hong Kong-based organisation named after the original Humanitarian League.

== Contributions to organisations ==
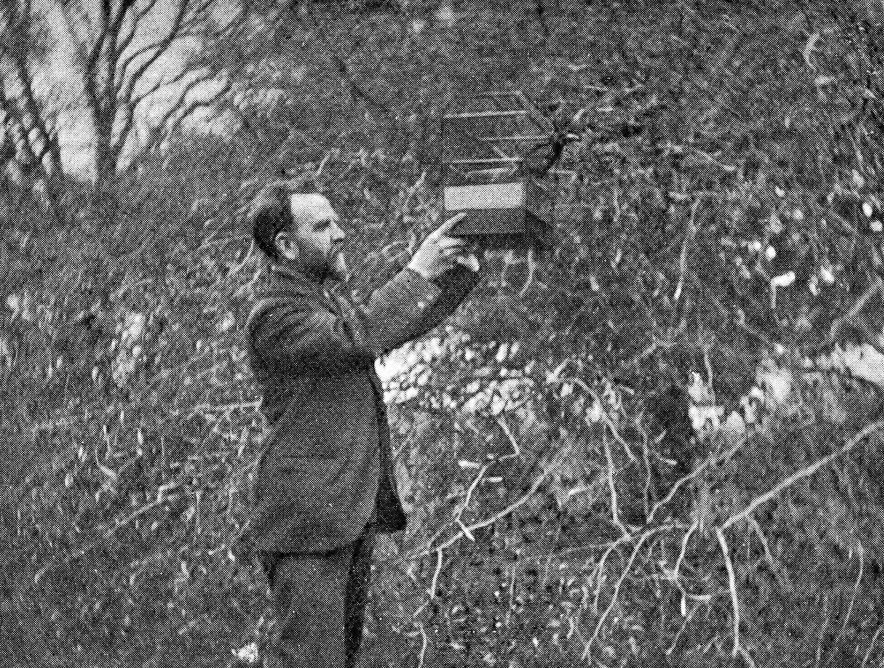
Bell freeing a caged bird c. 1902

Bell donated much of his income to societies during his life. He also co-founded or worked for animal and vegetarian organisations:

- Animals' Friend Society (1910) (committee member)
- Anti-Bearing Rein Association (honorary secretary)
- Anti-Vivisection Society (chairman)
- Cats Protection League (now known as Cats Protection; treasurer)
- Humanitarian League (chairman and treasurer for over 20 years)
- League for the Prohibition of Cruel Sports (now known as the League Against Cruel Sports; co-founder and honorary treasurer)
- London Vegetarian Society (chairman of committee)
- National Anti-Vivisection Society (chairman)
- National Canine Defence League (council member)
- National Equine Defence League (treasurer)
- National Society for the Abolition of Cruel Sports (co-founder)
- Performing and Captive Animals' Defence League (co-founder)
- Pit Ponies' Protection Society (treasurer)
- Royal Society for the Protection of Birds (council member)
- Society for the Prevention of Cruelty to Animals (honorary secretary of the Hampstead branch for 30 years)
- Universal Mercy Band Movement British Empire Division (treasurer)
- Vegetarian Society (vice-president 1896–1914; president 1914–1933)

== Selected publications ==
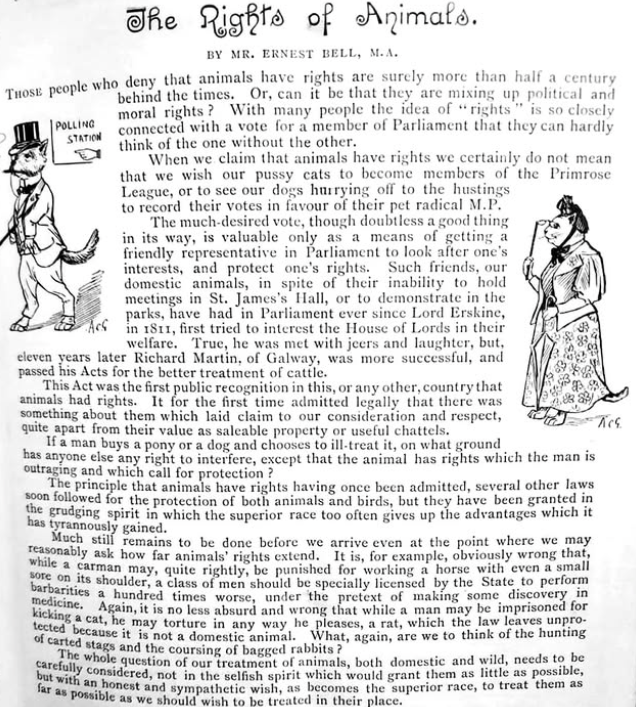
"The Rights of Animals" authored by Bell in The Animals' Friend, 1894

=== Writing ===
- The Animals' Friend. 1904., illustrated book
- Christmas Cruelties. 1907.
- Stray Thoughts About Vegetarians. 1910.
- Why Do Animals Exist?. 1910.
- Big-Game Hunting. 1915.
- The Need for Humane Education. 1915.
- In a Nutshell: Cons and Pros of the Meatless Diet. 1920.
- An After-Life for Animals. 1922.
- Some Social Results of the Meatless Diet. 1924.
- Bell's Joy Book. 1926., a collection of games and puzzles; Bell donated the profits to the Vegetarian Home for Children
- Fair Treatment for Animals. 1927.
- The Humane Diet and Common Sense. 1927.
- Proper Relationship between Men and the Other Animals. 1927.
- Superiority in the Lower Animals. 1927.
- Summer School Papers: Animal, Vegetable and General. 1928.
- The Wider Sympathy. 1932.

=== Editing ===
- The Inner Life of Animals. 1913.
- Speak Up for the Animals: Poems for Reading and Recitations. 1923.

== See also ==
- History of animal rights
- History of vegetarianism
- Vegetarianism in the Victorian era
- List of animal rights advocates
- Timeline of animal welfare and rights
