= J. Howard Moore =

American zoologist and philosopher (1862–1916)

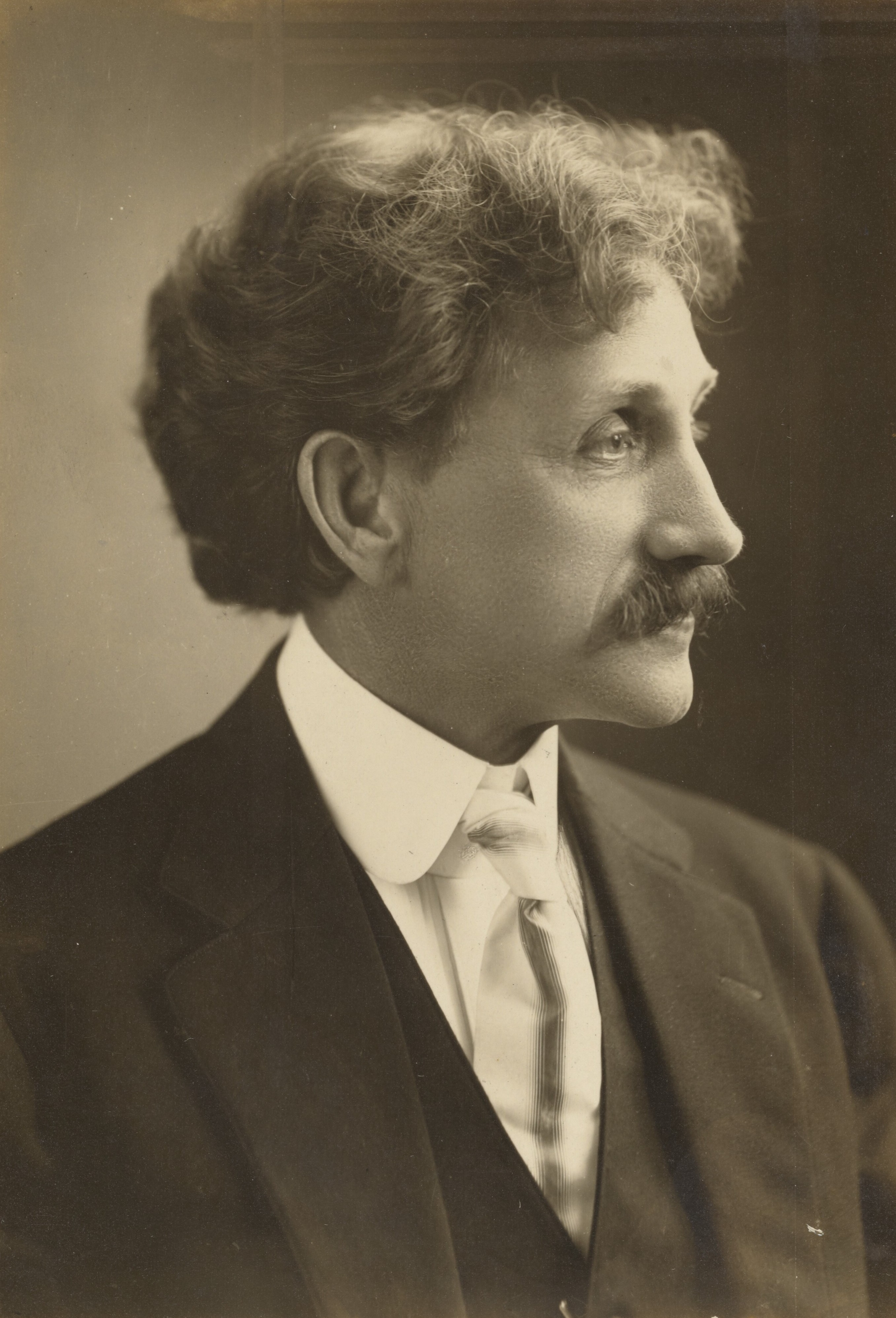
- Moore, c. 1914
- Born: John Howard Moore; December 4, 1862; Rockville, Indiana, U.S.
- Died: June 17, 1916 (aged 53); Wooded Island, Jackson Park, Chicago, Illinois, U.S.
- Resting place: Excelsior Cemetery, Mitchell County, Kansas, U.S. 39.3967018°N 98.3578033°W
- Education: Oskaloosa College; Drake University; University of Chicago (A.B. in zoology, 1896)
- Occupations: Zoologist; philosopher; educator; social reformer
- Years active: 1890–1916
- Organizations: Chicago Vegetarian Society; Humanitarian League
- Known for: Animal rights and ethical vegetarianism advocacy
- Notable work: The Universal Kinship (1906)
- Spouse: Louise Jesse "Jennie" Darrow (m. 1899)
- Relatives: Clarence Darrow (brother-in-law)

John Howard Moore (December 4, 1862 – June 17, 1916) was an American zoologist, philosopher, teacher, and social reformer who wrote about animal ethics, ethical vegetarianism, humane education, socialism, temperance, and evolutionary biology. In The Universal Kinship (1906), he drew on Darwinian evolutionary theory to argue that the Golden Rule should extend to all sentient beings, rather than humans alone.

Moore was born near Rockville, Indiana, and grew up in Linden, Missouri, before living in Kansas and Iowa. He attended Oskaloosa College, Drake University, and the University of Chicago, earning an A.B. in zoology in 1896. He adopted vegetarianism, rejected Christianity, and became a socialist. At Chicago, he helped found the university's Vegetarian Eating Club and won a national oratorical competition on prohibition. From 1898, he taught at Crane Technical High School and other Chicago schools.

Moore belonged to the Chicago Vegetarian Society and the British Humanitarian League. His books included Better-World Philosophy (1899), The Universal Kinship (1906), The New Ethics (1907), and works on moral education and evolution. His writings circulated among vegetarian, socialist, and humanitarian reformers, including Henry S. Salt, Clarence Darrow, Mark Twain, Jack London, and Eugene V. Debs. He died by suicide in Jackson Park, Chicago, in 1916, following years of illness and chronic pain.

== Biography ==
=== Early life and education ===
John Howard Moore was born on December 4, 1862, near Rockville, Indiana. (Note: Several sources give Moore's place of birth as Linden, Atchison County, Missouri. A Cawker City Ledger obituary records his place of birth as Rockville, Indiana and that he moved to Linden shortly afterwards. The 1910 United States census also lists Moore as being born in Indiana.) He was the eldest of the six children of William A. Moore and Mary Moore (née Barger). He had three brothers and two sisters. His family moved to Linden, Missouri, when he was six months old. Over the next 30 years, the family moved between Kansas, Missouri, and Iowa.

Moore was raised in a Christian household. According to Donna L. Davey, his childhood religious teaching presented humans as having dominion over the Earth and other animals. Moore later wrote that, while growing up on a farm, he hunted and accepted the view that animals existed for human purposes.

Moore studied at High Bank School in Linden until the age of 17, then attended a college in Rock Port, Missouri, for one year. He attended Oskaloosa College in Iowa from 1880 to 1884 without graduating. He later attended Drake University. According to Davey, his study of Darwin's theory of evolution contributed to his rejection of Christianity and his opposition to the view that animals existed solely for human use. Moore also studied law under C. H. Hawkins in Cawker City, Kansas.

=== Early career ===
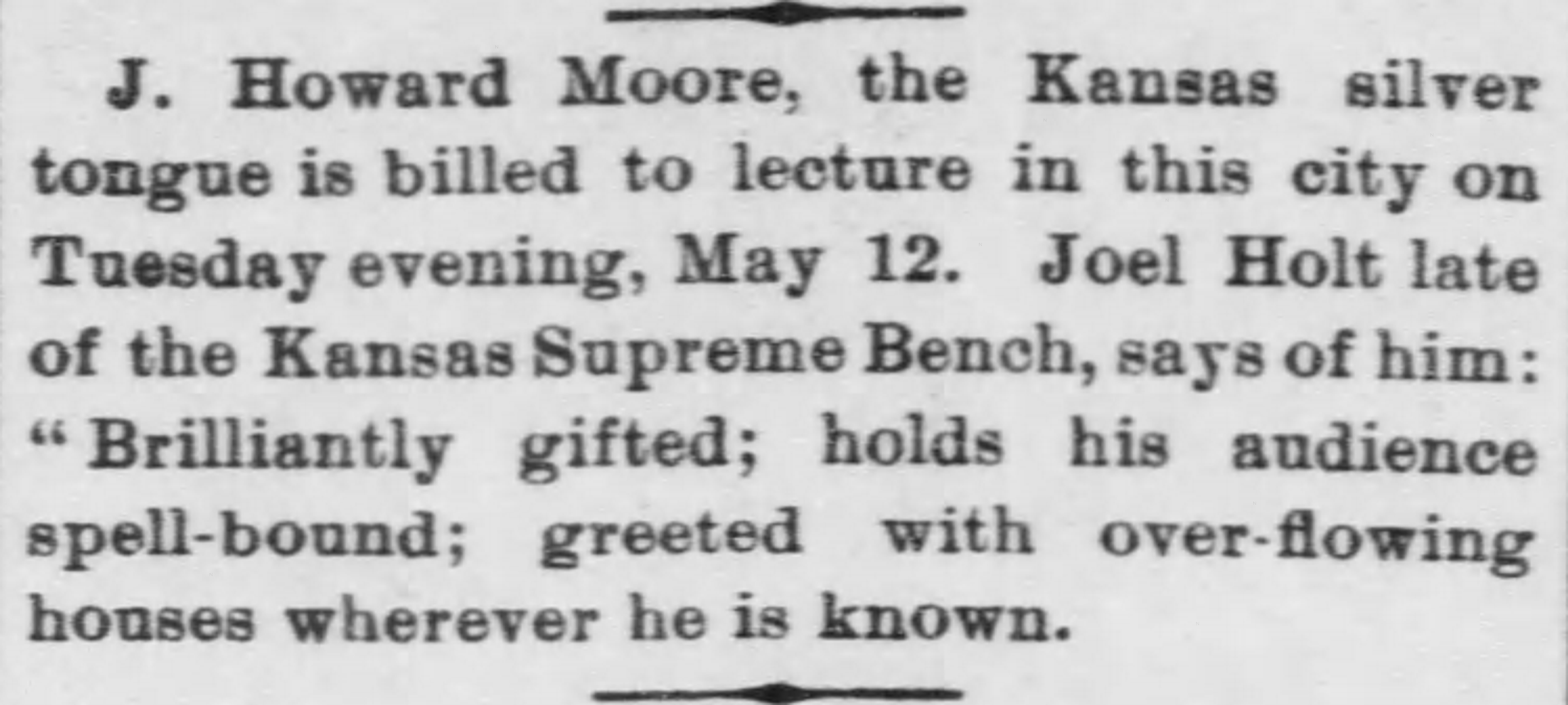
Lecture billing notice, 1891

In 1884, Moore was appointed as an examiner for the Board of Teachers in Mitchell County, Kansas. In 1886, he ran for a seat in the United States House of Representatives and finished last out of five candidates. During this period, he adopted vegetarianism for ethical reasons.

In 1889, Moore worked for the National Lecture Bureau. A newspaper described him as the "silver tongue of Kansas" and a "youthful Luther", and praised his speaking and singing voice. In the summer of 1890, he studied voice culture in singing and speaking at the Chautauqua Institution in Chautauqua, New York. From 1890 to 1893, Moore lectured in Kansas, Missouri, and Iowa. He also lectured for the Woman's Christian Temperance Union.

I came to the conclusion out there on the Kansas prairies that the animals were not treated right by human beings. I thought we had not even a right to kill them for food and came to the University of Chicago to study the matter. At that time I had never heard of vegetarianism.

— J. Howard Moore

Moore's first pamphlet, A Race of Somnambulists (1890), condemned the treatment of animals for food, sport, and fashion. According to Davey, Moore criticized Thanksgiving as an occasion for gluttony and killing, and argued that the sympathy extended to enslaved people and women should also extend to animals.

During this period, Moore lived on a farm south of Cawker City and worked as a reporter for The Beloit Daily Call, submitting rural correspondence about local events.

=== University of Chicago studies and activities ===
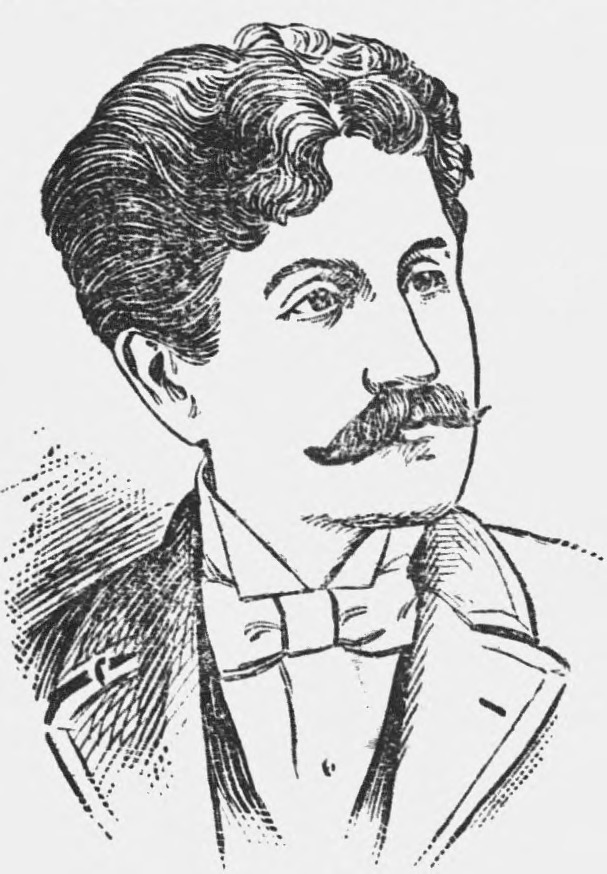
Moore, 1895

Moore entered the University of Chicago with advanced academic standing in 1894. He graduated in April 1896 with an A.B. degree in zoology.

While studying there, he became a socialist and served as vice president of the university's Prohibition Club. He also co-founded its Vegetarian Eating Club, serving as president in 1895 and as purveyor (Note: As purveyor, Moore supplied food for the club; he took care to "preserve a proper balance of albumenoids, carbo-hydrates, phosphates and mineral in each menu.") the following year.

In 1895, Moore won the Prohibition Club's annual oratory contest with a speech titled "The Scourge of the Republic". He also won the state prohibition contest at Wheaton, Illinois, that April. He later won first honors at the national contest in Cleveland. A newspaper profile described Moore as a supporter of women's suffrage.

=== Chicago Vegetarian Society ===
Moore belonged to the Chicago Vegetarian Society and the British Humanitarian League. According to historian Bernard Unti, he modeled the Chicago society on the League.

In 1895, Moore delivered an address to the Society that was published as Why I Am a Vegetarian and serialized in its journal, the Chicago Vegetarian, in 1897. Arguing that concern for suffering should extend to all sentient beings, he explained his refusal to eat meat: "I never want happiness that gives another pain". He treated meat consumption as one example of sacrificing the interests of other beings for human convenience.

Favorable reviews appeared in The Phrenological Journal of Science and Health in 1899 and 1900. Laurence Gronlund, a Danish-born American lawyer, lecturer, and political activist, wrote a pamphlet in response titled Why I Am Not a Vegetarian: Why He is Wrong. In reply to Gronlund's critique, Moore asserted that for a carnivore, "every meal is a murder" and argued that explaining why one is "not a vegetarian" is an attempt to justify predation.

In 1898, Moore was given a full-page column in the Society's journal, the Chicago Vegetarian.

=== Teaching career ===
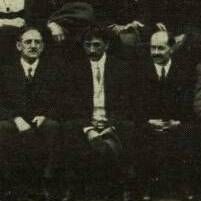
Faculty of Crane Technical High School, Chicago; Moore is seated at center, 1914

In the summer of 1896, Moore lectured on social progress through the University of Wisconsin's extension program.

In 1898, Moore began teaching ethics and zoology at Crane Technical High School, where he remained for the rest of his career. He also taught at other schools in Chicago, including Calumet High School and Hyde Park High School. In 1908, Moore taught courses on elementary zoology, physiographic ecology, and the evolution of domestic animals at the University of Chicago for three quarters.

An Illinois law passed in 1909 required public schools to teach morals for 30 minutes each week. According to Davey, Moore welcomed the requirement, unlike many of his colleagues, and began preparing teaching materials.

In February 1912, some members of the Schoolmasters' Club of Chicago objected to Moore's political views during a meeting. Moore responded: "I am a radical and a socialist, but I do not allow my radicalism nor my socialism to enter into my teachings."

In 1913–1914, Moore opposed a Chicago Board of Education proposal to discontinue teaching sex hygiene, writing to the board in support of the subject. In January 1914, he spoke on the issue at Hull House in Chicago. The board later dropped the proposal.

=== Writings ===
==== Better-World Philosophy ====
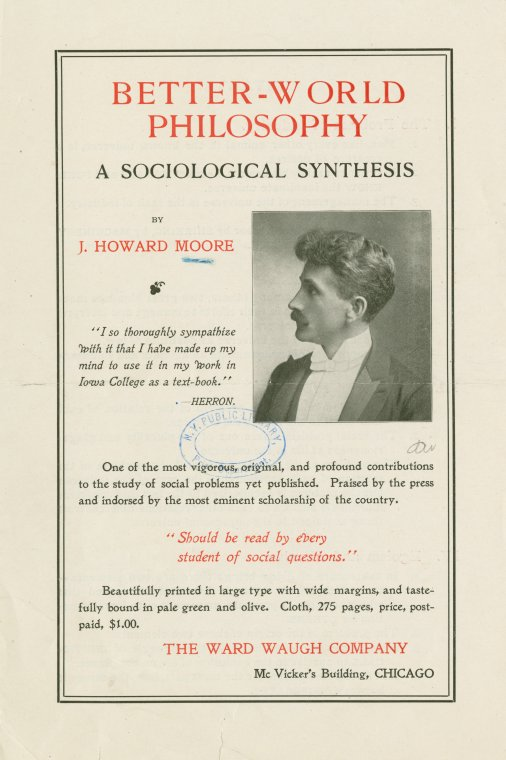
Advertisement for Better-World Philosophy, 1899

Moore's first book, Better-World Philosophy: A Sociological Synthesis, appeared in 1899. According to Davey, it argued that sentience was the basis of moral consideration, including consideration for nonhuman animals. The book also discussed eugenics, procreation, moral education, and the relationship between self-interest and concern for others.

The book received mixed reviews. Lester Frank Ward praised its independent thought, and David Starr Jordan praised its style and conclusions.

==== Fermented Beverages ====
Moore's Fermented Beverages: Their Effects on Mankind (1900) examined the physical, psychological, and social effects of alcohol. It addressed its harms and possible benefits and questioned some arguments for strict prohibition.

==== The Universal Kinship ====
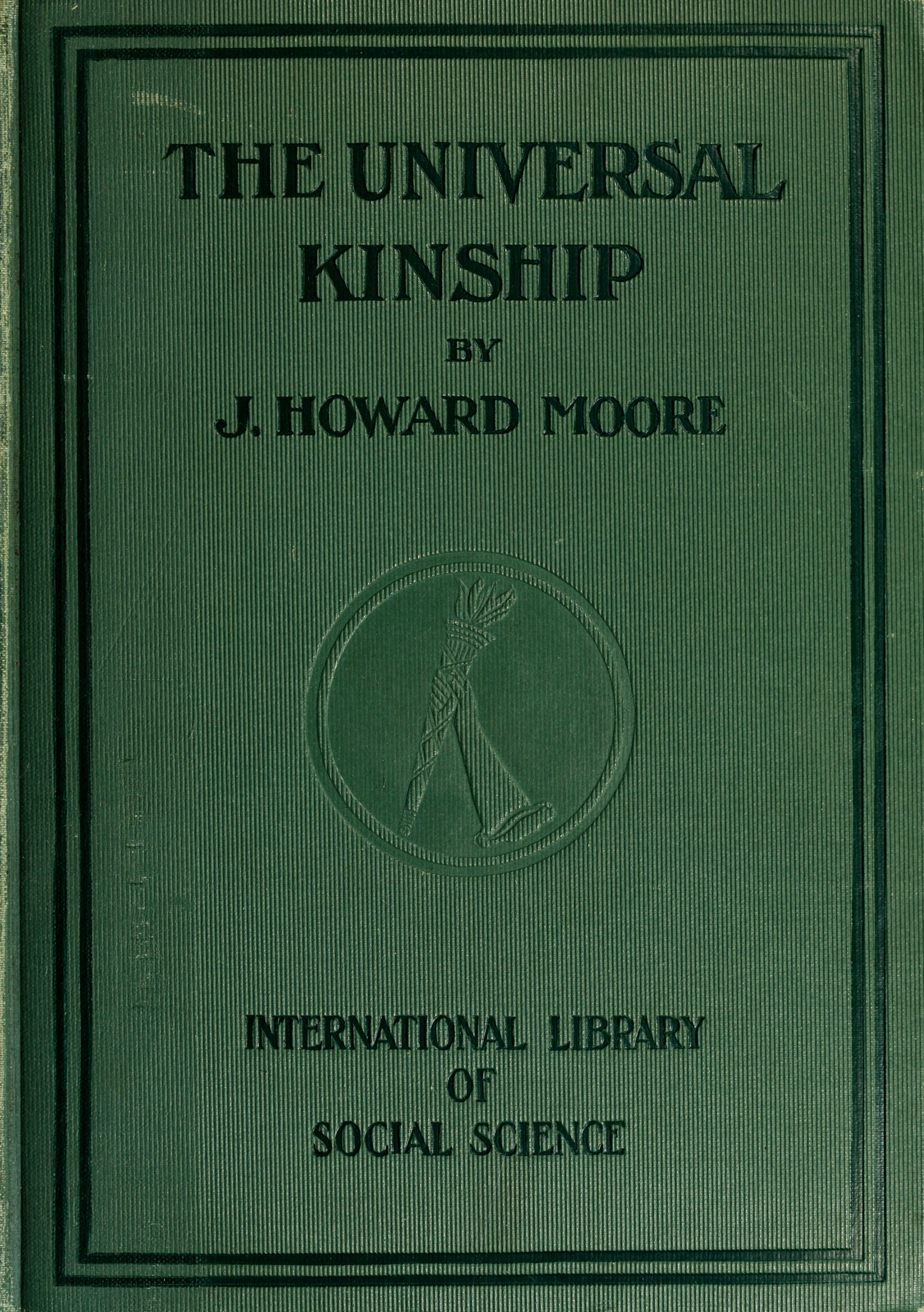
Cover of The Universal Kinship, 1906

Moore published The Universal Kinship in 1906. The book examined Darwinian evolution and the physical, mental, and ethical relationships between humans and other animals. Moore drew on evolutionary writers including Darwin, Huxley, Haeckel, Romanes, and Lubbock.

Moore used the theory of evolution to challenge the separation of humans from other animals and argued that the Golden Rule should apply to all sentient beings.

The book received favorable reviews. It was endorsed by Mark Twain, Jack London, Eugene V. Debs, Mona Caird, Richard F. Outcault, and Ella Wheeler Willcox. It also received favorable mentions in British publications, including The Humanitarian, Reynold's Newspaper, and the Manchester News.

==== The New Ethics ====
Moore published The New Ethics in 1907. Davey describes it as a further argument against anthropocentrism, based on Moore's interpretation of Darwinian evolution.

==== Ethics textbooks ====
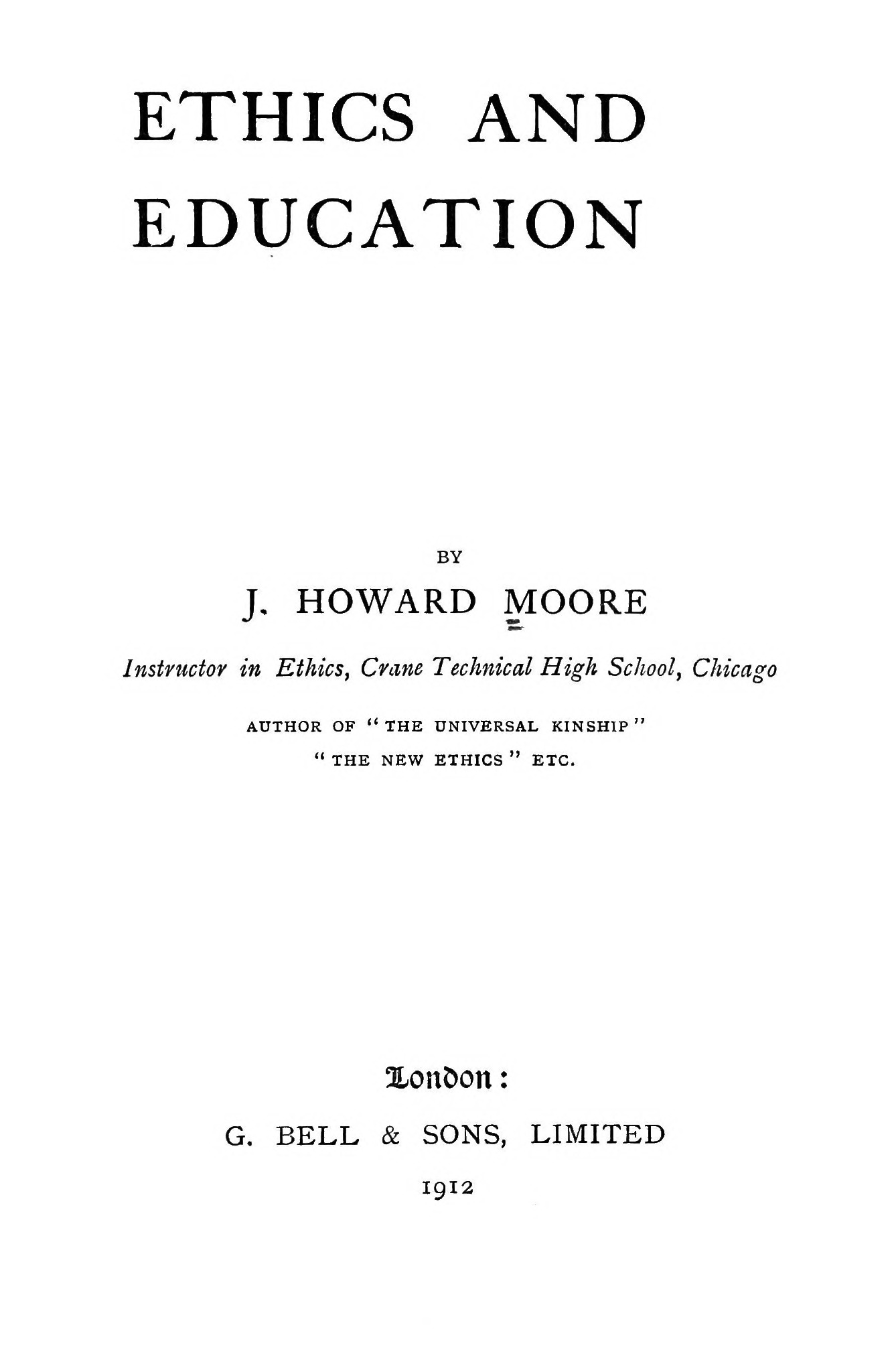
Title page of Ethics and Education, 1912

Moore wrote Ethics and Education (1912) for teachers following the introduction of compulsory moral instruction in Illinois public schools. He discussed physical, vocational, intellectual, and ethical education, and argued that moral teaching should extend concern to all sentient beings.

Before publication, Moore drew controversy after circulating extracts that criticized the courts and marriage. In an interview, he defended the book and invited the Board of Education to investigate him.

Also in 1912, Moore published High-School Ethics: Book One, intended as the first of four volumes for a high school ethics course. Its subjects included school conduct, care of pets, women's rights, birds, the use of sealskin and ivory, and personal habits.

Moore also published The Ethics of School Life, a pamphlet based on a lesson he gave to students at Crane Technical High School.

==== The Law of Biogenesis ====
Moore published The Law of Biogenesis: Being Two Lessons on the Origin of Human Nature in 1914. The book comprised 32 discourses developed from lectures at Crane Technical High School. The book includes an introduction by Mary Marcy, a radical socialist writer and editor of the International Socialist Review. Moore used the term "biogenesis" for physical and mental recapitulation, defining it as the process by which beings repeat the evolutionary development of their ancestors.

A reviewer for Life, in 1915, described the book as authoritative and straightforward.

==== Savage Survivals ====
His final book, Savage Survivals (1916), collected 63 lectures delivered at Crane Technical High School. Its five sections discussed domesticated animals, human ancestry, and characteristics that Moore regarded as survivals from earlier stages of human development. It contained 27 illustrations by Roy Olson and L. F. Simmons.

F. Stuart Chapin's 1917 review in the American Journal of Sociology praised the book as a presentation of organic and social evolution for children and as a treatise on prehistoric human evolution, but stated that some of its anthropology was outdated.

==== Other works ====
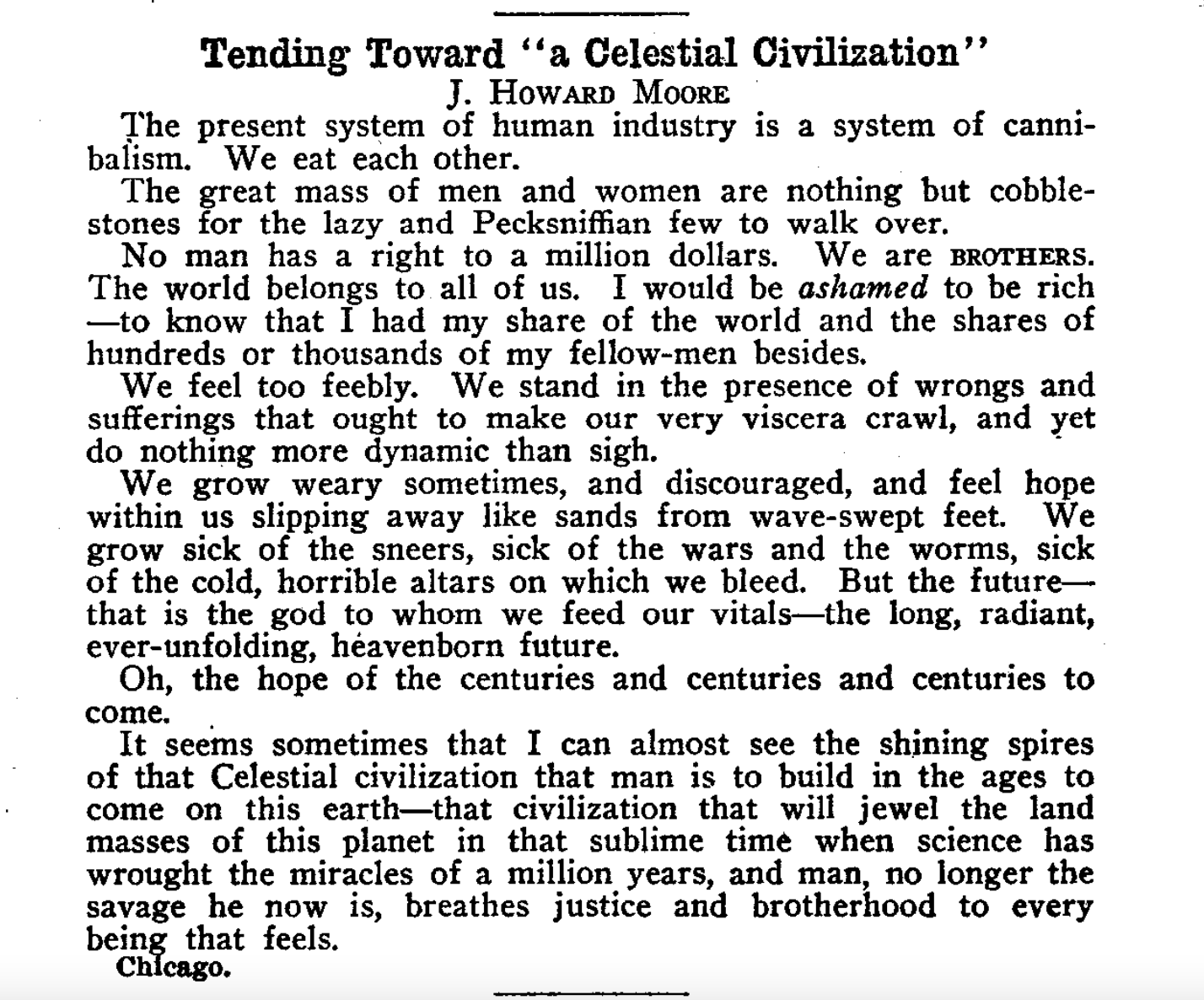
"Tending Toward 'A Celestial Civilization'", 1910

Moore wrote articles and pamphlets for humane organizations and journals, including the Humanitarian League, Millennium Guild, Massachusetts SPCA, American Anti-Vivisection Society, American Humane Association, and the Order of the Golden Age. His subjects included vegetarianism, animal rights, human-animal relations, temperance, and humane education.

In "America's Apostasy" (1899), Moore criticized American imperialism and the Philippine–American War. He argued that the United States had abandoned its principles of liberty and justice and compared American soldiers in the Philippines to British redcoats during the American Revolution.

In 1908, he criticized Theodore Roosevelt's plans for his hunting expedition to Africa in an article. In another article, published in 1910, he described Roosevelt as a forceful personality with an intense interest in killing animals.

In June 1916, Moore published "The Source of Religion" in the International Socialist Review. The article argued that religion was a human creation that arose early in mental development and persisted through tradition after science had given natural explanations for the world. The article provoked discussion.

An obituary in the Los Angeles Times stated that Moore had completed a book titled The Life of Napoleon, but it was not published.

=== Advocacy and public speaking ===
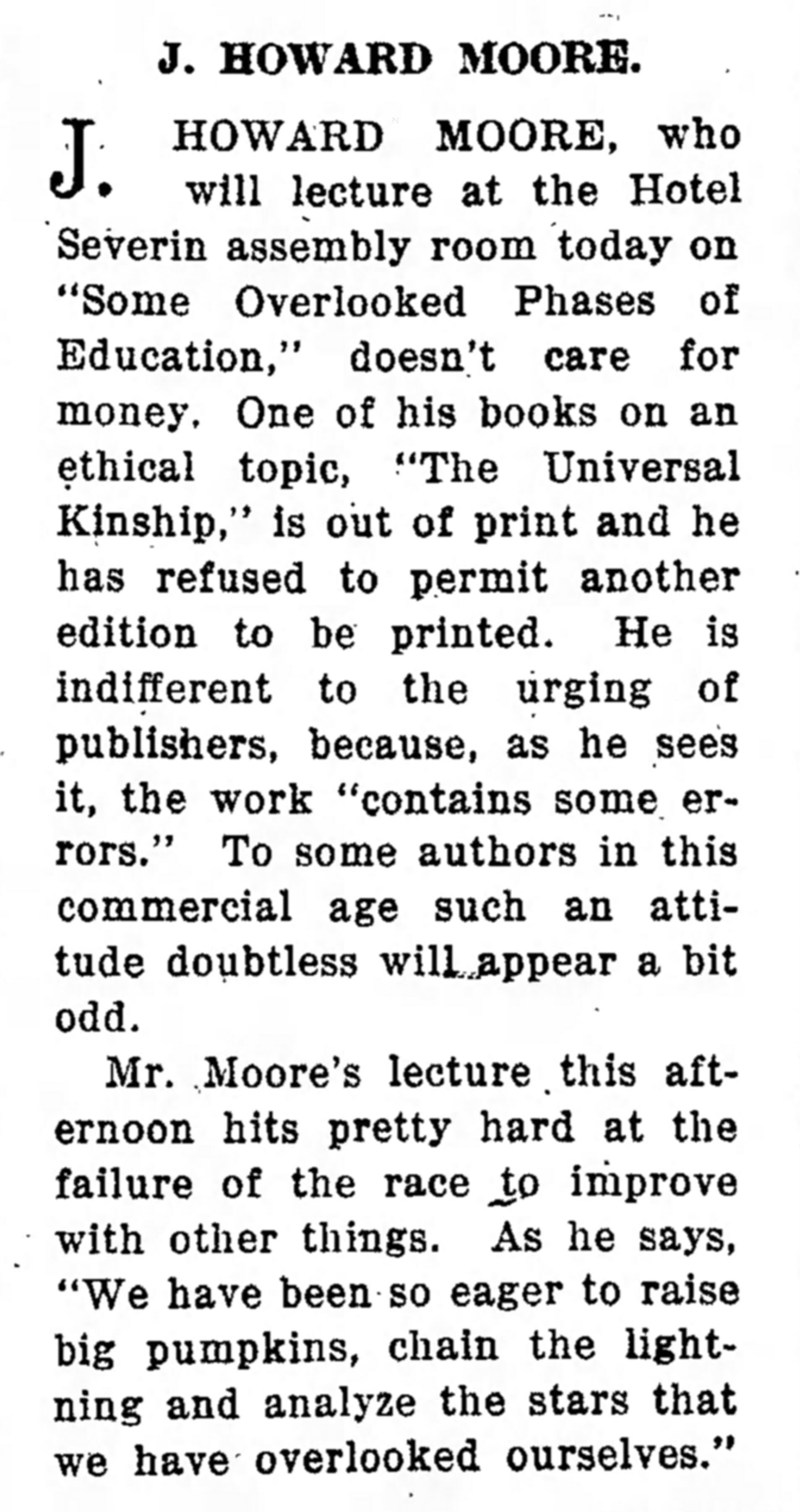
Lecture billing notice, 1914

Moore continued public speaking while working as a teacher. Many of his speeches were printed as pamphlets, some distributed free of charge. Davey writes that he spoke on vegetarianism, fur, socialist candidates, animal rights, ethics, women's suffrage, hunting, war, and alcohol.

In November 1906, Moore's speech "The Cost of a Skin" caused controversy at the American Humane Association's convention. In the speech, Moore denounced the use of fur and feathers in fashion as "conscienceless and inhumane". Audience reaction was mixed; some applauded, others remained silent, and two women left before the speech ended. The speech was later published as a chapter in The New Ethics (1907), as a pamphlet by the Animals' Friend Society of London, and in The Herald of the Golden Age. In the version published in The New Ethics (1907), Moore also criticised leather as a by-product of the meat trade and advocated the development of plant-derived substitutes for leather, particularly for footwear.

On October 25, 1908, Moore addressed the Young People's Socialist League in support of Eugene V. Debs, the Socialist Party candidate for U.S. president. The Chicago Daily Tribune reported that Moore argued that Debs would imprison wealthy people rather than the usual prisoners, and that young people and university students were receptive to socialist teaching.

The Millennium Guild, founded by Emarel Freshel in 1912, has been described as the first animal rights society established in the United States. In 1913, Moore was listed as a member of the Boston branch.

In 1913, Moore spoke at the International Anti-vivisection and Animal Protection Congress in Washington, D.C. He argued that vivisection and meat consumption arose from anthropocentrism and that Darwin's On the Origin of Species had weakened claims of human superiority or uniqueness.

=== Personal life ===
==== Marriage ====
Moore married Louise Jesse "Jennie" Darrow on February 21, 1899, in Racine, Wisconsin. She was the sister of attorney Clarence Darrow and worked as a schoolteacher. (Note: Moore's wife taught first grade at McCosh School and later taught home economics at Crane Technical High School, where Moore also taught.) She also supported animal rights and vegetarianism. Both Moore and his wife admired the character Tess from Thomas Hardy's Tess of the d'Urbervilles, and Moore used "Tess" as a pet name for his wife. He was also an enthusiast of the works of Alexandre Dumas, which he first encountered at the Cawker City library.

==== Henry S. Salt ====
Howard Moore was one of the truest and tenderest of our friends, himself prone to despondency and, as his books show, with a touch of pessimism, yet never failing in his support and encouragement of others and of all humanitarian effort. "What on earth would we Unusuals do, in this lonely dream of life," so he wrote in one of his letters, "if it were not for the sympathy and friendship of the Few?"

— Henry S. Salt

Henry S. Salt, co-founder of the Humanitarian League and author of Animals' Rights: Considered in Relation to Social Progress, became acquainted with Moore's writing through Better-World Philosophy (1899). Salt reviewed the book and began a correspondence with Moore that became a close friendship.

In a letter to Salt, Moore described writing as a demanding process and said that he was often immobilized by feelings of horror. He wrote that he disliked writing and believed he could be relatively content without the pressure to produce literary work.

On March 25, 1911, Moore wrote to Salt about depression and a breakdown caused by overwork. He said that although his books might not accomplish much, he had put a great deal of effort into them.

In his 1921 memoir, Salt discussed Moore's reasons for suicide and criticized what he considered the guarded coverage of his death in English animal advocacy journals. Salt dedicated his 1923 book The Story of My Cousins to Moore and, in his 1930 autobiography Company I Have Kept, wrote about their friendship despite the fact that they never met in person.

Salt later described Moore's The Universal Kinship as the "best ever written in the humanitarian cause." A selection of Moore's letters to Salt was included in the appendix of the 1992 edition, edited by Charles R. Magel.

==== May Walden Kerr ====
Moore was a close friend of May Walden Kerr, the wife of Charles H. Kerr, who published many of Moore's books. After the Kerrs divorced in 1904, Moore and Walden continued corresponding, and Moore and his wife sometimes vacationed with Walden and her daughter.

==== Lightning strike ====
In 1885, Moore was struck by lightning, receiving burns to his arm and chest and temporarily losing his sight and speech. He recovered after six days of bed rest. For the rest of his life, Moore suffered from severe headaches that were attributed to the injury. In 1908, he published an account of the incident in the Cawker City Public Record.

==== Wilderness preservation ====
Moore advocated wilderness preservation. In 1914, he purchased 116.5 acres (47.1 ha) near Mobile Bay, Alabama. In a letter written on his birthday that year, he described the land as containing many kinds of trees. Moore wanted the property to serve as a wildlife sanctuary and a place for public enjoyment, and stated in his will that the land should be preserved as it was. He described it as remote, inhabited by many animals, and containing about a mile of water from a river and brook.

=== Death ===
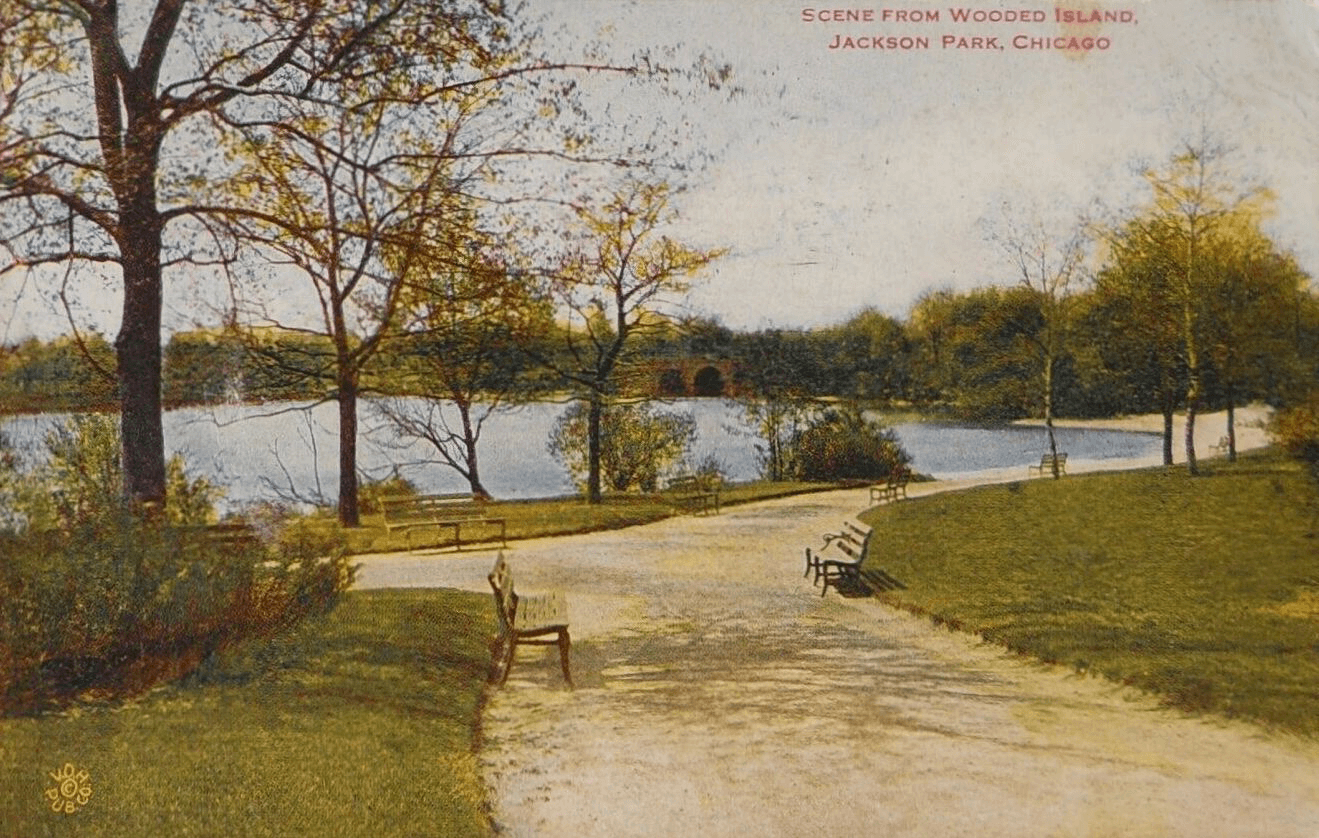
Wooded Island in Jackson Park, Chicago, 1916

Clarence Darrow's eulogy

On June 17, 1916, Moore died by suicide on Wooded Island in Jackson Park, Chicago, at the age of 53. He had often visited the island to observe and study birds.

Moore had experienced illness and chronic pain since undergoing surgery for gallstones in 1911. He had also expressed despondency about human indifference to animal suffering. In a note found on his body by a police officer, he wrote to his wife:

The long struggle is ended. I must pass away. Good-by. Oh, men are so cold and hard and half conscious toward their suffering fellows. Nobody understands. O my mother, and O my little girl! What will become of you? And the poor four-footed! May the long years be merciful! Take me to my river. There, where the wild birds sing and the waters go on and on, alone in my groves, forever. (Note: Moore owned an orchard on the shores of a river, near Earlville, Alabama; according to Clarence Darrow, this was the place he was referring to.) O, Tess, (Note: Tess was Moore's pet name for his wife. They were both admirers of Thomas Hardy's Tess of the d'Urbervilles.) forgive me. O, forgive me, please!

The contemporary verdict attributed Moore's suicide to a "temporary fit of insanity". His wife initially requested cremation and burial of his ashes on land he owned in Mobile County, Alabama. His brother-in-law, Clarence Darrow, was affected by his death.

A funeral service was held at Oakwood Chapel in Chicago on June 19. Darrow delivered a eulogy, calling Moore a "dead dreamer" who had died while "suffering under a temporary fit of sanity". The eulogy was later published in The Athena. Moore's body was returned to his former home near Cawker City, where a funeral service was held at Plainview Church. He was buried alongside his father in Excelsior Cemetery, Mitchell County, Kansas.

== Philosophy ==
=== Universal Kinship ===
Yes, do as you would be done by—and not to the dark man and the white woman alone, but to the sorrel horse and the gray squirrel as well; not to creatures of your own anatomy only, but to all creatures. You cannot go high enough nor low enough nor far enough to find those whose bowed and broken beings will not rise up at the coming of the kindly heart, or whose souls will not shrink and darken at the touch of inhumanity. Live and let live. Do more. Live and help live. Do to beings below you as you would be done by beings above you.

— J. Howard Moore

Moore's doctrine of Universal Kinship drew on Darwinian evolution to argue for moral obligations among sentient beings. He argued that advances in human knowledge and technology had not been matched by comparable changes in ethical conduct, particularly toward animals.

Moore criticized moral anthropocentrism as an expression of human arrogance. Philosopher David Lamb discusses Moore's use of Darwinian evolution to challenge the idea that humanity occupies a privileged position in nature, quoting his observation that "Man is not the end; he is but an incident, of the infinite elaboration of Time and Space".

Moore used the phrase "moral provincialism" to criticize the exclusion of animals from ethical concern. According to Kerry S. Walters and Lisa Portmess, he compared discrimination against animals with prejudice based on race and gender. He argued that because animals were conscious and capable of suffering, they had claims to humane treatment and should be treated as ends-in-themselves, rather than solely as sources of food or clothing. Davey connects Moore's despair over this issue with his suicide.

For Moore, applying the Golden Rule beyond humanity required treating animals with consideration rather than merely as commodities.

=== Zoöcentricism ===
The ideal relation of the inhabitants of the universe to each other, then, is that relation which will most actively conduce to the welfare of the universe; and the welfare of the universe means, not the welfare of any one individual or guild, but the welfare of all the beings who now inhabit it, and of those who shall come after—the welfare of that mighty and immortal personality who comprehends all species and continues from generation to generation—the Sentient Cosmos.

— J. Howard Moore

Moore called his ethical position zoöcentricism, placing sentient beings rather than humanity alone at its center. He argued that actions should be judged by their effects on the welfare or suffering of sentient beings. In his account, nonsentient things could not enter into moral relationships because they lacked experiences to which ethical consideration could apply. On this basis, he contended that without sentience there would be no ethics.

=== Ethical vegetarianism ===
Moore defended vegetarianism on ethical grounds. In Why I Am a Vegetarian, he drew on compassion for animal suffering and Darwinian ideas about the relationship between humans and other animals. He argued that evolutionary theory undermined attempts to exclude animals from moral consideration.

=== Socialism ===
Moore interpreted socialism as a stage in the evolution of human cooperation. In Better-World Philosophy, he compared the development of societies to unicellular organisms forming colonies and argued that societies were moving from individualism toward greater interdependence. He advocated socialism as a means of reducing hereditary disadvantages and providing support for the weak.

== Reception ==
=== Historical reception ===
==== Reactions to Moore's death ====
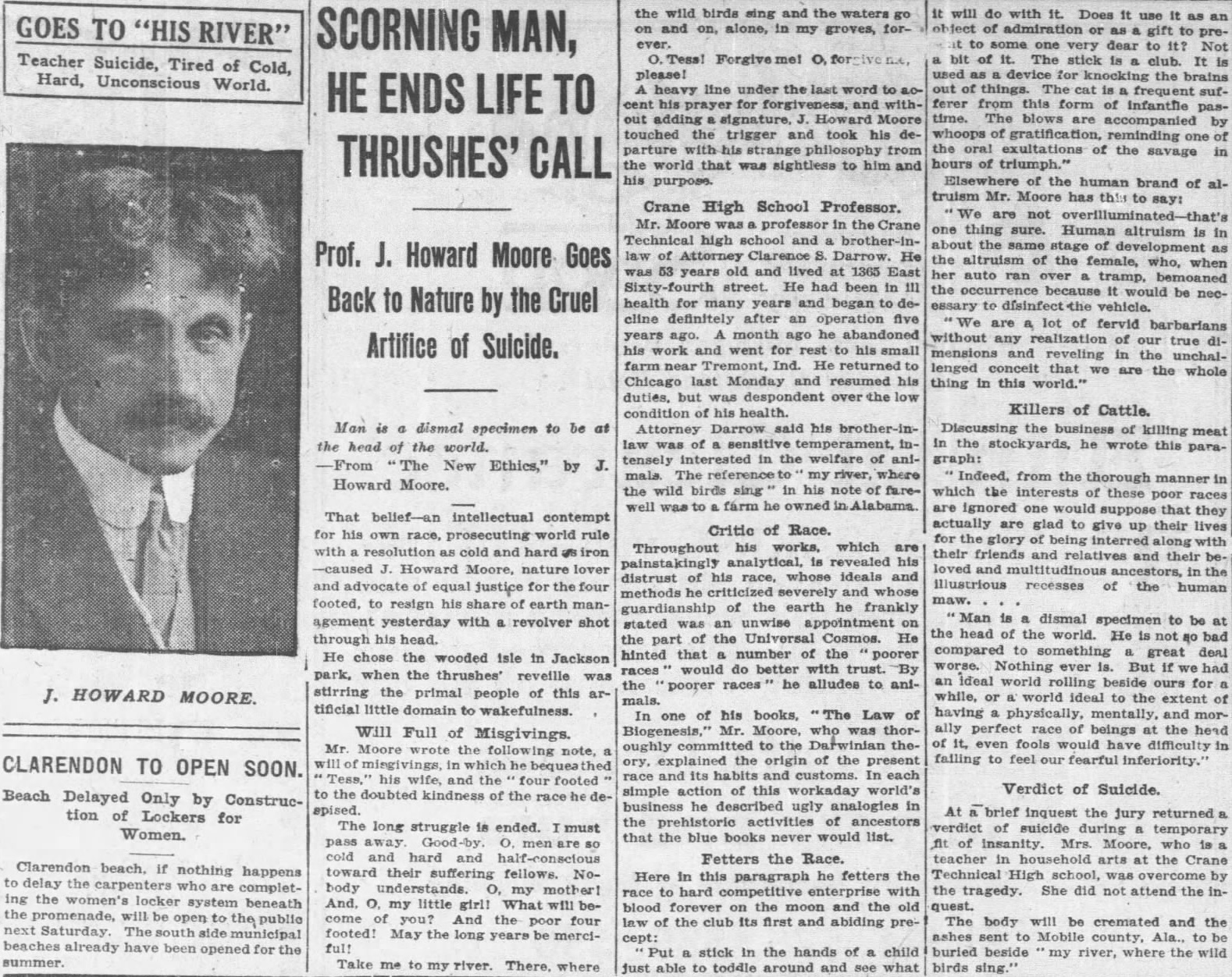
Chicago Tribune obituary, 1916

Reporting Moore's death, the Chicago Tribune described him as a misanthrope. His relatives and friends, including his brothers-in-law Clarence and Everett Darrow, disputed this characterization and recalled his kindness, concern for justice, and dedication to teaching. An obituary in the Humanitarian League's journal The Humanitarian called Moore "one of the most devoted and distinguished humanitarians with whom the League has had the honor of being connected."

Felix Ortt wrote about Moore's death in the Dutch animal protection magazine Androcles, describing Moore's work for humanitarian and vegetarian causes, Ortt's translation of Moore's writings, and their correspondence. Louis S. Vineburg, who heard Moore speak at a Young People's Socialist League lecture in early 1910, later published a personal recollection in the International Socialist Review.

Jack London had endorsed The Universal Kinship and marked a passage in his personal copy: "All beings are ends; no creatures are means. All beings have not equal rights, neither have all men; but all have rights". After Moore's death, London wrote at the head of a printed copy of Darrow's eulogy: "Disappointment like what made Wayland (Appeal to Reason) kill himself and many like me resign."

==== Reception of Moore's work ====
Historian Chien-hui Li writes that Moore's views were more readily received in Britain than in the United States because of support from the Humanitarian League, George Bell & Sons, and The Animals' Friend. Jarvis argues that the American humanitarian movement did not become established in the same way, and that, after Ernest Crosby's death in 1907, Moore represented much of what remained of it in the United States. Jarvis also writes that World War I ended the wider humanitarian movement.

Unti writes that contemporaries took Moore's Darwinian arguments seriously, but that his particular approach was not continued by a major animal-protection figure or organization after his death.

==== Posthumous publications and translations ====
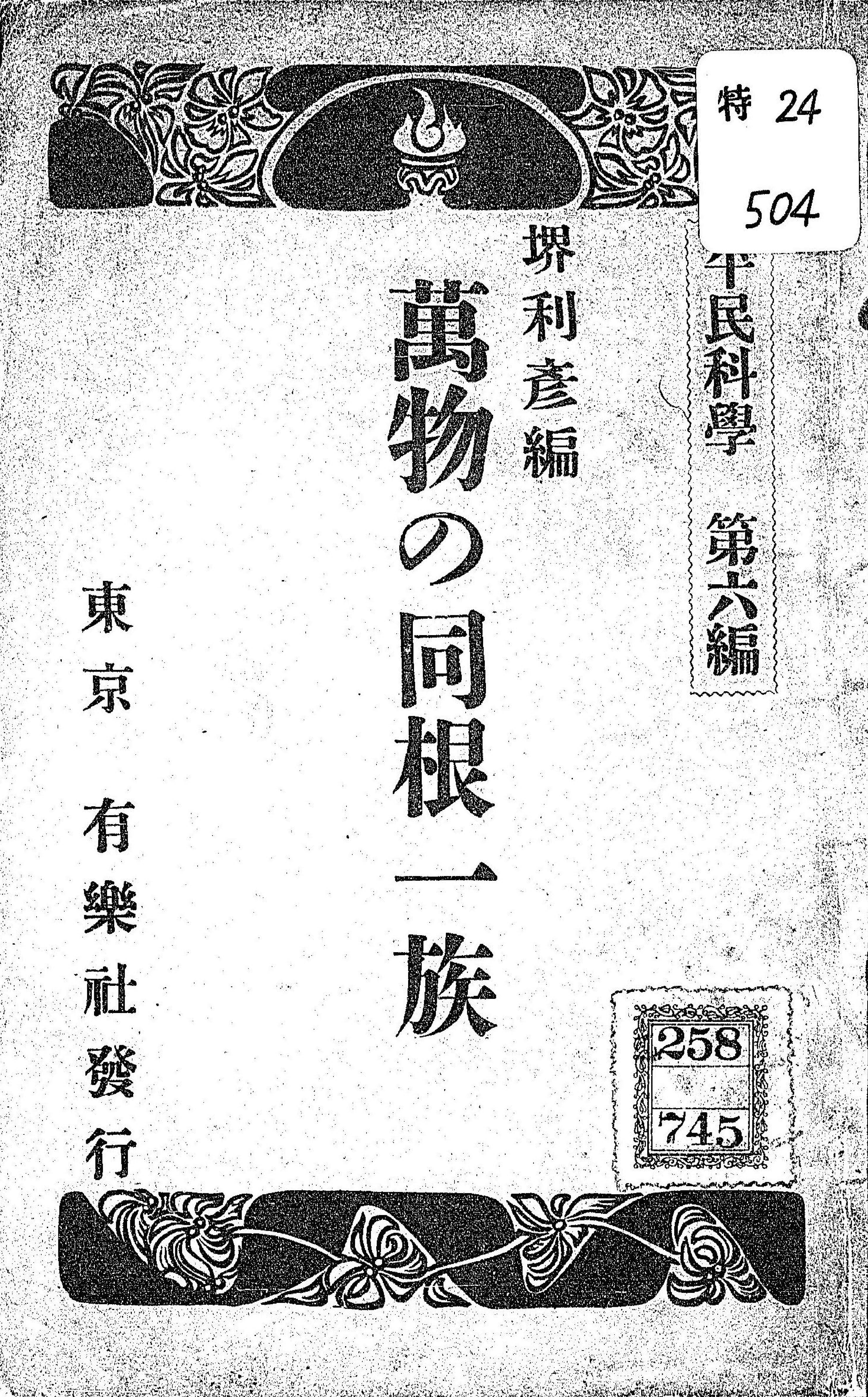
Title page of the Japanese translation of The Universal Kinship, 1908

In 1915, the International Socialist Review began excerpting Moore's works and continued to do so for three years. After his death, radical publications, including those of the Industrial Workers of the World, also printed excerpts, especially from Savage Survivals.

Several of Moore's works were translated into other languages. Savage Survivals and The Law of Biogenesis were translated into Croatian; Savage Survivals was translated into Chinese; three books were translated into Dutch by Felix Ortt; The Law of Biogenesis was translated into Slovenian; and four books were translated into Japanese by anarchist and socialist translators, including Ōsugi Sakae, Sakai Toshihiko, Hitoshi Yamakawa, and Yamakawa Kikue.

=== Later scholarship ===
==== Ethical vegetarianism and animal rights ====
According to Davey, Moore received relatively little scholarly attention before Charles R. Magel republished The Universal Kinship in 1992. Later histories of vegetarianism and animal ethics have examined his arguments for ethical vegetarianism. Historian Rod Preece describes Moore's arguments for ethical vegetarianism as anticipating later approaches, but finds no evidence of direct influence on the American intelligentsia of his time. Preece also identifies Moore, Thomas Hardy, and Henry S. Salt as pre-World War I writers who connected Darwinian evolution with animal ethics.

Walters and Portmess compare Moore's ethical arguments with those of Albert Schweitzer and Peter Singer, and regard his criticism of discrimination against animals as anticipating Singer's account of speciesism. Davey argues that themes in Moore's writing later became part of the modern animal rights movement. James J. Kopp describes Moore as a figure in early twentieth-century advocacy for the ethical treatment of animals. Bernard Unti states that The Universal Kinship may make Moore the first American animal rights thinker. Animal rights activist Henry Spira cited Moore as an example of a leftist who was willing to advocate animal rights.

Simon Brooman and Debbie Legge write that Moore anticipated later criticism of human-centered domination of animals and a philosophy based on the "unity and consanguinity" of living organisms. Environmental historian Roderick Nash argues that Moore and Edward Payson Evans deserve more attention as early philosophers in the United States who moved beyond anthropocentrism.

Selections of Moore's works were included in Jon Wynne-Tyson's 1985 book, The Extended Circle: A Dictionary of Humane Thought. Mark Gold cites Moore and Henry S. Salt as the two main inspirations for his 1995 book, Animal Rights: Extending the Circle of Compassion.

==== Scientific racism ====
Prehistoric archaeologist Robin Dennell has criticized Moore's Savage Survivals as an example of scientific racism. Mark Pittenger argues that Moore's racism was influenced by Herbert Spencer's The Principles of Sociology and that similar views were held by contemporary American socialists. Gary K. Jarvis describes Moore as a critic of social Darwinism, writing: "Moore argued that social Darwinists derived their beliefs from the worst examples that evolution offered, not the best."

==== Perceptions of misanthropy ====
Unti argues that the Chicago Tribune's description of Moore as a misanthrope influenced later accounts of his place in American environmental ethics. In Unti's view, these accounts sometimes overlooked Moore's political commitments and broader writings. He interprets Moore's criticism of human conduct as opposition to domination of other humans and animals rather than hatred of humanity. Unti points to Moore's socialism, his work on social justice, and his relationship with the socialist publisher and ethical vegetarian Charles H. Kerr. Jarvis similarly argues that Moore's criticism of anthropocentrism and Western civilization was misread as misanthropy.

== Publications ==
=== Articles, chapters, and essays ===
- "The Cost of Rum". Kirksville Democrat. January 8, 1892. p. 6.
- "Meat Not Needed as Food". Chicago Tribune. April 29, 1895.
- "The Vegetarian Eating Club, of Chicago University". The Vegetarian. 1 (3): 42–44. September 15, 1895.
- "The Unconscious Holocaust". Good Health: A Journal of Hygiene. 32 (2): 74–76. February 1, 1897.
- "Why I Am a Vegetarian". Chicago Vegetarian. 2 (1). September 1897.
- "The Logic of Vegetarianism". Food, Home and Garden. 2 (13). Vegetarian Society of America: 22–23. January 1898.
- "Clerical Sportsmen". Chicago Vegetarian. 3: 5–6. November 1898.
- "The Psychical Kinship of Man and the Other Animals". The Humane Review: 121. July 1900.
- "How Vegetarians Observe the Golden Rule". The Vegetarian and Our Fellow Creatures (11): 295–297. August 15, 1901. hdl:2027/mdp.39015074773923.
- "Our Debt to the Quadruped". The Humane Review: 32. April 1902.
- "Realization". Herald of the Golden Age. 8: 119. 1903.
- "The Foundation of Good Health". Good Health. 39 (1): 6–7. January 1, 1904.
- "Universal Kinship". Herald of the Golden Age. 8: 38–42. April 1906.
- "Does Man Overestimate Himself?". Herald of the Golden Age. 11 (6): 121. April 1907.
- "The Cost of a Skin". Herald of the Golden Age. 11 (6): 140–141. July 1907.
- "Being Struck by Lightning". Cawker City Public Record. November 5, 1908. p. 5.
- "Superiority of a Vegetable Diet". The Present Truth. 25 (43): 682. October 28, 1909.
- "Decries Roosevelt Butchery" (PDF). Worlds Advance Thought and Universal Republic. 23 (1): 110. May–June 1909. Archived from the original (PDF) on January 16, 2017.
- "The Martyrs of Civilization". Herald of the Golden Age. 12 (8): 150–151. October 1909.
- "Treatment, Real and Ideal, of Animals". Lompoc Journal. November 6, 1909. p. 2.
- "Humanitarian in the Schools". The Humane Review: 198. 1909–1910.
- Allen, Henry E., ed. (1910). "Tending Toward 'a Celestial Civilization'" (PDF). To-Day's Problems and Their Solution (PDF). Chicago: Trade Union Book Concern. p. 11. Archived from the original on November 1, 2021.
- "Stop Eating Meat and Help Stop the Killing". Santa Cruz Sentinel. Vol. 56, no. 95. April 21, 1910.
- "Why Eat Meat?". Signs of the Times. 37 (25): 14. June 28, 1910.
- "Discovering Darwin". Proceedings of the International Anti-Vivisection and Animal Protection congress, held at Washington, D.C. December 8th to 11th, 1913. New York: The Tudor Press. 1913. pp. 152–158.
- "Evolution and Humanitarianism". The National Humane Review. 1 (1): 4. January 1913.
- "Ethical Education". Herald of the Golden Age. 16 (7): 180–182. July 1913.
- "Evidences of Relationship: 1. Man-like Apes". Our Dumb Animals. 47 (3). August 1914.
- "Evidences of Relationship". The Idaho Republican. November 13, 1914. p. 5.
- "Man's Inhumanity to Beast". Los Angeles Herald. Vol. 42, no. 98. February 23, 1916.
- "The Source of Religion". International Socialist Review. 16 (12): 726–727. June 1916.
- "Our Neglect of Ethical Culture". The Open Door. December 1916.

=== Books and pamphlets ===
- A Race of Somnambulists. Mount Lebanon, N.Y.: The Lebanon Press. 1890. OCLC 844898030.
- Why I Am a Vegetarian: An Address Delivered before the Chicago Vegetarian Society. Chicago: Purdy Publishing Company. 1895. OCLC 39674424.
- America's Apostasy. Chicago Chronicle. 1899. OCLC 474952078.
- Better-World Philosophy: A Sociological Synthesis. Chicago: The Ward Waugh Company. 1899. OCLC 5340920.
- Clerical Sportsmen: A Protest Against the Vacation Pastime of Ministers of the Gospel. Chicago: Chicago Vegetarian. 1899.
- Fermented Beverages: Their Effects on Mankind. London: Harrison and Sons. 1900. OCLC 1117891376.
- Bell, Ernest, ed. (1906). The Whole World Kin: A Study in Threefold Evolution. London: G. Bell & Sons. OCLC 752821941.
- The Universal Kinship. Chicago: Charles H. Kerr & Co. 1906. OCLC 3704446.
- The Cost of a Skin. London: Animal Defence and Anti-Vivisection Society.
- The Logic of Humanitarianism.
- The New Ethics. London: Ernest Bell. 1907. OCLC 562001556.
- Humane Teaching in Schools. London: Animals' Friend Society. 1911. OCLC 47787900.
- The Care of Illegitimate Children in Chicago. Juvenile Protective Association of Chicago. 1912. OCLC 897573246.
- Ethics and Education. London: G. Bell & Sons. 1912. OCLC 919898381.
- The Ethics of School Life: A Lesson Given at the Crane Technical High School, Chicago, in Accordance with the Law Requiring the Teaching of Morals in the Public Schools of Illinois. London: G. Bell & Sons. 1912. OCLC 20736690.
- High School Ethics: Book One. London: G. Bell & Sons. 1912. OCLC 820734455.
- The Law of Biogenesis: Being Two Lessons on the Origin of Human Nature. Chicago: Charles H. Kerr & Co. 1914. OCLC 1019536598.
- Savage Survivals. Chicago: Charles H. Kerr & Co. 1916. OCLC 7391868045.

== See also ==
- List of animal rights advocates
- History of animal rights
- History of vegetarianism
- Progressive Era
- Edward Payson Evans – American scholar (1831–1917)
- Beatrice Lindsay – English zoologist (1858–1917)
