= Why I Am a Vegetarian =

1895 pamphlet by J. Howard Moore

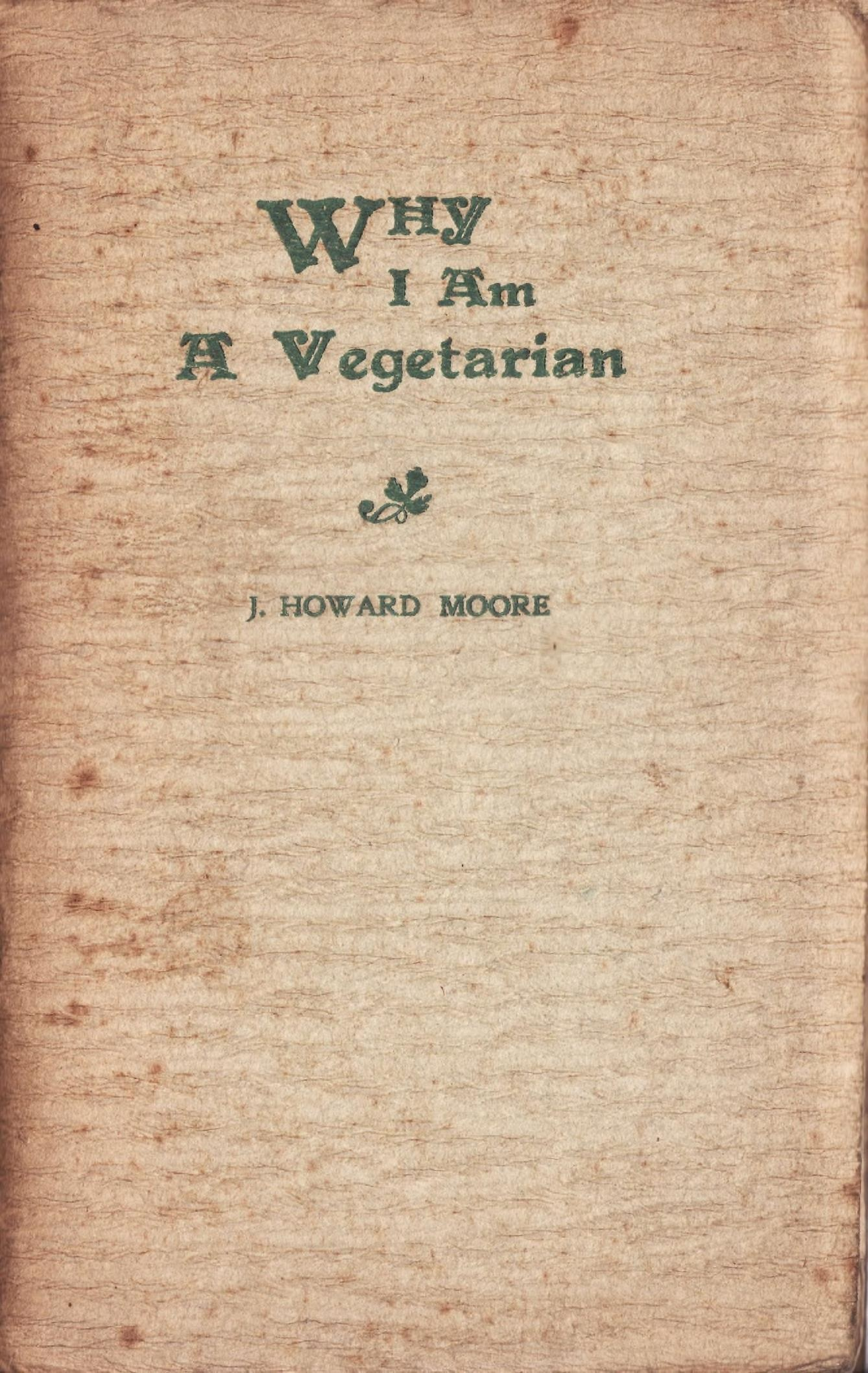
- Cover of an early edition
- Author: J. Howard Moore
- Language: English
- Subject: Ethical vegetarianism
- Publisher: Frances L. Dusenberry
- Publication date: 1895
- Publication place: United States
- Media type: Print (pamphlet)
- Pages: 44
- OCLC: 39674424
- Text: Why I Am a Vegetarian at Wikisource

Why I Am a Vegetarian: An Address Delivered before the Chicago Vegetarian Society is an 1895 pamphlet by American zoologist and philosopher J. Howard Moore. Based on an address delivered to the Chicago Vegetarian Society, it presents an ethical argument for vegetarianism, drawing on evolutionary theory, the Golden Rule and the principle of justice. Moore opposes the killing and exploitation of animals, arguing that their interests deserve moral consideration and rejecting the belief that other species exist for human use.

Published in Chicago in 1895, the pamphlet appeared in several editions during the late 19th century. It received favorable notices in vegetarian and health-reform publications but was criticized by the Journal of the American Medical Association. It also prompted a published rebuttal by Laurence Gronlund, to which Moore responded.

== Background and publication ==
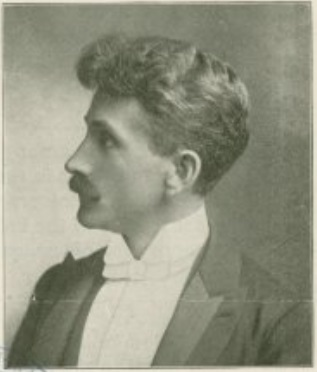
Moore, c. 1899

J. Howard Moore (1862–1916) was an American zoologist, philosopher and advocate of vegetarianism and humanitarianism. He became a vegetarian for ethical reasons around 1886.

The Chicago Vegetarian Society was founded around 1890 by Carrica Le Favre, a lecturer and advocate of health and dress reform. Moore joined the society while attending the University of Chicago, where he studied zoology. He also helped establish the university's Vegetarian Eating Club.

Moore delivered the address on which Why I Am a Vegetarian was based before the Chicago Vegetarian Society in 1895. The published text includes a preface dated May 1895 in which Moore describes the pamphlet as an attempt to reduce human disregard for other animals. He presents its purpose as promoting solidarity between humans and other species.

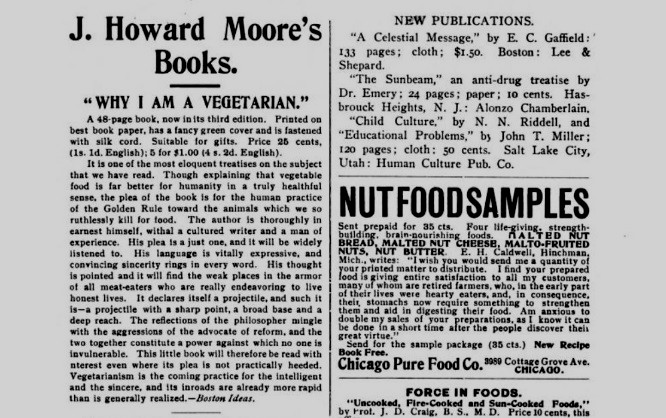
Advertisement for Moore's publications in The Vegetarian Magazine, 1902

The pamphlet was published in Chicago in 1895 under the imprint of Frances L. Dusenberry, with printing undertaken by the Purdy Publishing Company. A 42-page issue was also listed in 1895 under the imprint of the Ward Waugh Publishing Company.

An early edition sold for 10 cents. A third edition, issued in 1898, contained 48 pages. In 1902, The Vegetarian Magazine advertised the pamphlet for 25 cents, or five copies for one dollar. The advertisement described an edition with a green cover fastened by a silk cord. By 1899, it had reached its seventh thousand and was being sold in crepe paper for 25 cents.

The text also circulated in vegetarian periodicals. Rod Preece lists a version published in the September 1897 issue of Chicago Vegetarian. Moore published a related article under the same title in The Union Signal on June 6, 1895.

In 1896, Food, Home and Garden reported on a reading of Moore's paper at the Philosophic Club in Englewood, Chicago. Viola H. Ludden praised it as "broad and most excellent; full of scientific suggestion and humane thought."

Moore subsequently developed his ethical arguments in books including Better-World Philosophy (1899), The Universal Kinship (1906), The New Ethics (1907) and Savage Survivals (1916).

== Contents ==
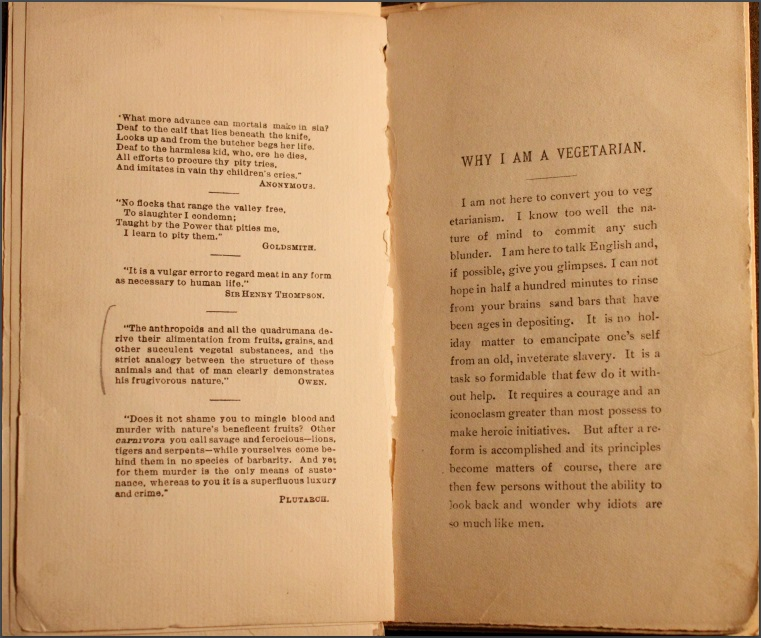
Opening page of the pamphlet

The preface to Why I Am a Vegetarian compares changing moral beliefs to a snake shedding its skin. Moore argues that accepted practices can eventually come to be regarded as unjust and presents vegetarianism as one of the reforms through which human morality might develop. The following page contains quotations from Oliver Goldsmith, Sir Henry Thompson, Richard Owen and Plutarch, as well as an anonymous poem condemning the slaughter of animals.

=== Animal ethics and evolution ===
Moore argues that vegetarianism follows from the same ethical principles used to condemn the exploitation of human beings. He defines exploitation as the suppression of another being's interests or welfare for the benefit of others and maintains that the distinction between humans and nonhuman animals does not justify treating their lives as expendable. He compares killing animals for food with practices condemned as robbery and murder in human society.

Moore grounds this position partly in Charles Darwin's theory of evolution. He rejects the anthropocentric belief that other species were created for human use, arguing that evolutionary theory establishes a biological relationship between humans and other animals. He describes vegetarianism as "the ethical corollary of evolution" and maintains that humans differ from other animals in degree rather than kind.

The pamphlet discusses emotional and intellectual capacities shared by humans and other species, including fear, love, loyalty, curiosity and maternal affection. Moore draws examples from dogs, horses, birds, ants and other animals to argue that their interests and experiences deserve consideration. He criticizes the treatment of working horses, the killing of birds for feathers, animal experimentation, hunting for sport and the slaughter of animals for food.

=== Vegetarianism and social reform ===
Moore presents vegetarianism as an application of the Golden Rule beyond the human species. He argues that people who profess justice and compassion should extend these principles to other animals, whose suffering he considers morally relevant. He also criticizes religious arguments used to justify human dominance over animals.

Throughout the pamphlet, Moore compares the exploitation of animals with slavery, the subordination of women and the exploitation of workers. He invokes the abolitionist movement as an example of how practices once defended as natural or necessary could come to be condemned. He also connects vegetarianism with campaigns for political freedom and improved conditions for the poor.

In his analysis for the University of Geneva's Vegan Literary Studies project, Ridvan Askin examines these connections between animal exploitation and human oppression. Askin interprets Moore's argument as extending opposition to exploitation across species boundaries, with moral consideration based on the interests and capacities of living beings rather than their membership of a particular species.

=== Diet and health ===
Although ethics is the principal subject of the address, Moore also argues that meat is unnecessary for human nutrition. He maintains that vegetable foods can provide the nutrients required for health and physical strength and attributes improvements in his own health and well-being to abandoning meat.

Moore cites agricultural workers and populations whose diets contain relatively little meat as examples of physical endurance without flesh consumption. He also argues that growing crops for direct human consumption is more economical than raising animals for meat, particularly in relation to the amount of land required to produce food.

The concluding passages return to the moral obligations of humans towards other animals. Moore urges readers to extend kindness even to small and commonly disregarded creatures, describing them as "our fellow mortals". He ends by expressing the hope that the principles underlying the abolition of slavery and campaigns for women's rights will eventually be extended to workers and animals.

== Reception ==
Why I Am a Vegetarian received favorable notices in several vegetarian and health-reform publications. In July 1895, The Vegetarian praised Moore's argument and advocated wider distribution of the pamphlet. The Pacific Health Journal commended his discussion of the relationship between humans and other animals. A review in Good Health recommended the pamphlet to meat eaters, arguing that it would encourage readers to reconsider their treatment of animals.

An advertisement published in The Vegetarian Magazine in 1902 reproduced a favorable notice attributed to Boston Ideas, which praised Moore's eloquence and sincerity. In 1901, The Public discussed the pamphlet's comparison between killing animals and killing humans, questioning the moral distinction made between the two practices.

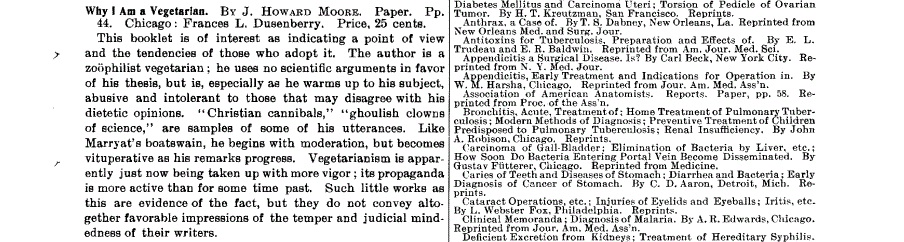
Review in the Journal of the American Medical Association, 1899

The Journal of the American Medical Association published a critical review on March 4, 1899. The reviewer described Moore as a "zoöphilist vegetarian" who offered "no scientific arguments" for his position and criticized his language towards meat eaters. The review concluded that the pamphlet reflected the increasing activity of the vegetarian movement but gave an unfavorable impression of the disposition of some of its advocates.

The religious periodical New Church Life described Moore's writing as vigorous but found his arguments unconvincing from a New Church perspective. It nevertheless acknowledged that the pamphlet contained arguments that could raise moral concerns about eating animals.

Moore's arguments also prompted a rebuttal by the Danish-American socialist writer Laurence Gronlund, titled Why I Am Not a Vegetarian: Why He Is Wrong. Moore responded by arguing that the killing of animals for food required moral justification, describing meat eating as a form of predation.

Historian Adam D. Shprintzen quoted Moore's description of vegetarianism as the ethical consequence of evolution at the beginning of the sixth chapter of The Vegetarian Crusade: The Rise of an American Reform Movement, 1817–1921 (2013).

== See also ==
- Bibliography of veganism and vegetarianism
- History of animal rights
- History of vegetarianism
