= Better-World Philosophy =

1899 book by J. Howard Moore

- First edition cover
- Author: J. Howard Moore
- Language: English
- Subject: Ethics; utilitarianism; animal ethics; social philosophy; evolutionary theory
- Genre: Philosophy; sociology
- Publisher: The Ward Waugh Company
- Publication date: 1899
- Publication place: United States
- Media type: Print (hardcover)
- Pages: 275
- OCLC: 5340920
- Text: Better-World Philosophy at the Internet Archive

Better-World Philosophy: A Sociological Synthesis is an 1899 treatise by American zoologist and philosopher J. Howard Moore, published by The Ward Waugh Company. Drawing on ethics, sociology, and evolutionary theory, the book sets out Moore's view that moral and social progress depend on recognizing the unity of life and extending ethical concern to all sentient beings. It discusses desire, labor, heredity, cooperation, moral development, and social organization, and argues that education and social reform can improve the welfare of humans and animals.

Better-World Philosophy received a mixed critical response. Some reviewers, including The Literary World, described Moore's outlook as pessimistic, while others, such as the Journal of Education and the Advocate of Peace, praised its clarity and ethical seriousness. The book was endorsed by figures including Henry Demarest Lloyd, Robert G. Ingersoll, George D. Herron, and John Peter Altgeld, and brought Moore into correspondence with the English humanitarian Henry S. Salt.

According to historian Donna L. Davey, Better-World Philosophy was Moore's first major work and reflected his moral idealism, his belief in moral education, and his support for eugenics as a means of social improvement.

== Background ==
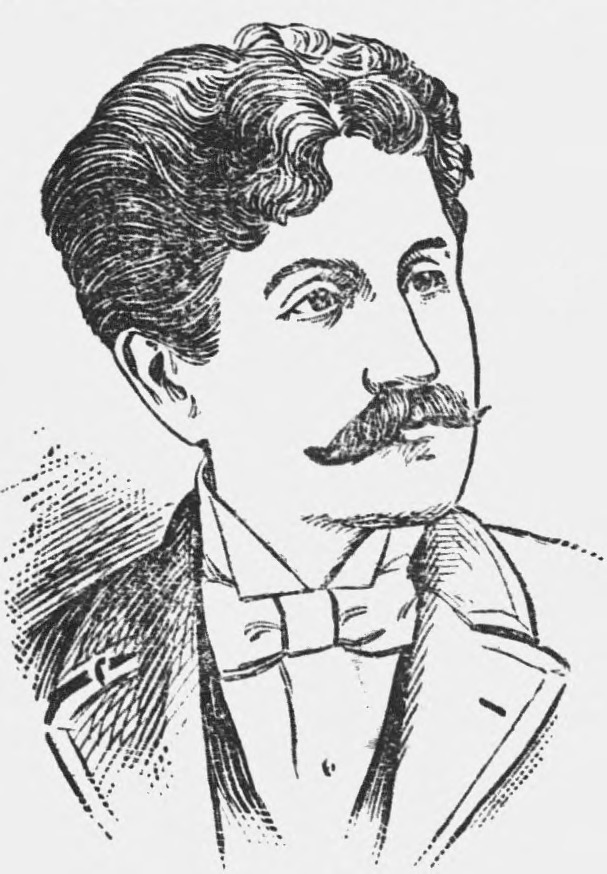
J. Howard Moore, 1895

J. Howard Moore (1862–1916) was an American zoologist and philosopher. He was an early advocate of animal rights and ethical vegetarianism. His writings were shaped by his scientific training and moral philosophy. Moore was also associated with the broader humanitarian movement of the late 19th and early 20th centuries, including reform efforts concerned with the treatment of both humans and animals.

Better-World Philosophy was part of Moore's larger body of work on vegetarianism, animal ethics, evolution, and social reform, which also included Why I Am a Vegetarian (1895), The Universal Kinship (1906), and The New Ethics (1907).

== Publication history ==
Better-World Philosophy was first published in Chicago by the Ward Waugh Company in 1899. A second edition was issued by Charles H. Kerr & Company in 1906, as part of its International Library of Social Science series. This was followed by a London edition published by Ernest Bell in 1907.

== Summary ==
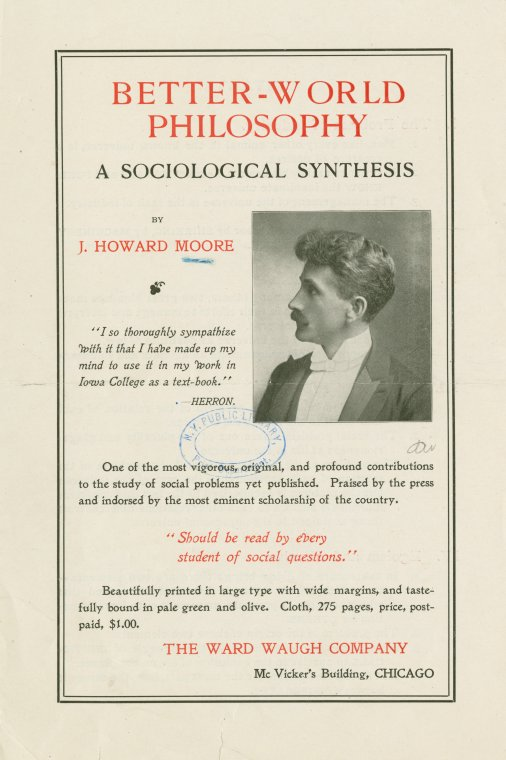
Advertisement for Better-World Philosophy, 1899

Better-World Philosophy is organized into nine sections. The chapters move from labor and human understanding of nature to moral and social evolution, ending with collective and individual ethical cultivation. In a prefatory note, Moore writes that the book "does not claim to be infallible—simply serious."

=== The problem of industry ===
Moore begins by describing humanity as part of the animal world and as driven by desire. To satisfy these desires, people must manage and anticipate the inanimate universe. Industry, he writes, is the organized management of nature for human purposes. Labor defines humanity's relation to the universe, and people try to escape it through shirking, machinery, and cooperation.

=== Blunders ===
This chapter identifies two major "blunders" made by humankind: treating the universe as lawless, and conceiving the inanimate world as conscious or voluntary. Moore argues that these errors distort humanity's approach to knowledge and progress.

=== The social problem ===
Moore defines the social problem as the relation of each individual to the rest of the universe. It arises from the plurality and sociability of life. Even when socialized, this relation remains the same in principle, but is complicated by conscious interdependence among individuals. Social desires, developed through associated life, are satisfied by cooperation rather than domination. Moore rejects the supposed infallibility of nature, arguing that morality must be consciously created.

=== Egoism and altruism ===
Moore identifies two tendencies in living beings: the impulse to act for oneself and the impulse to act for others. He argues that egoism developed through the struggle of individuals to survive, while altruism arose chiefly from struggles between groups. The balance between self-interest and sympathy forms the moral basis of social evolution in his account.

=== The preponderance of egoism ===
Moore surveys the dominance of egoism in human and animal life. He describes human egoism as especially excessive in its treatment of other species and of fellow humans. The persistence of selfish behavior, he argues, is the chief obstacle to moral and social progress.

=== The social ideal ===
The social ideal concerns the "ideal relation" among all beings in the universe, meaning the relation that best promotes the satisfaction of universal desire. Moore argues that this relation resembles what any individual would wish for themselves: a harmony of interests across the animate universe. He presents this principle as supported by the teachings of moral teachers and by historical, biological, and cosmic tendencies.

=== The derivation of the natures of living beings ===
Moore defines the nature of a being as the character of its conscious tendencies to act. He argues that the nature of organisms results from the interaction of heredity and environment. He describes environment as a trinity of inanimate, animate, and internal factors, each contributing to evolution.

=== Race culture ===
This chapter discusses heredity and moral progress through education and environmental influence. Moore argues that humanity can alter the "generative stream" through conscious social action, improving conditions by environmental and social selection rather than by chance. He discusses punishment, the neutralization of harmful selection, and the replacement of harsh natural discrimination with deliberate self-culture.

=== Individual culture ===
The final chapter turns to personal ethics. Moore maintains that true culture is moral as well as intellectual. The inculcation of altruism, he writes, is as important as the accumulation of knowledge. Because people are naturally egoistic, conscious culture must work to reduce selfishness with the same effort once devoted to developing intellect. He concludes with a call for moral self-discipline and mental transformation.

== Reception ==
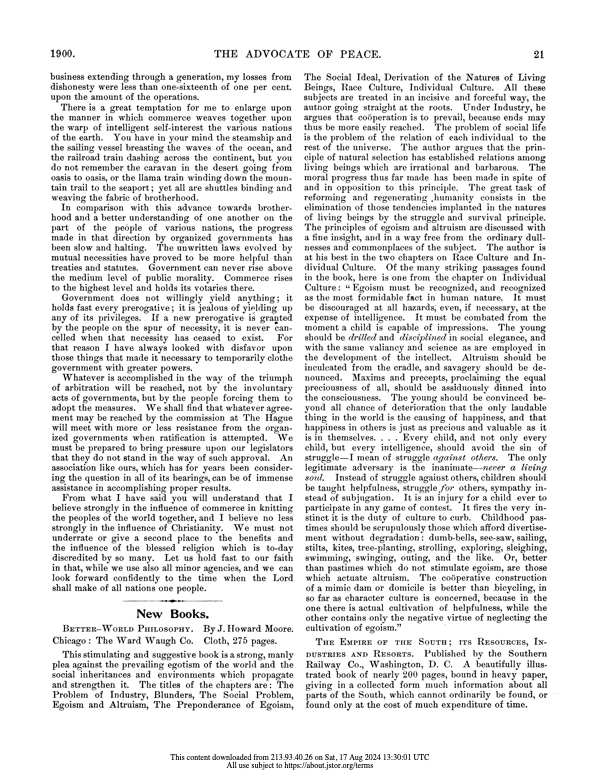
Review of Better-World Philosophy in The Advocate of Peace, 1900

=== Contemporary ===
In the Oakland Enquirer, A. A. Denison described Better-World Philosophy as a "suggestive and valuable" contribution to progressive thought. He described Moore's style as clear and logical and noted his use of evolutionary ideas in discussions of ethics and social reform. Denison regarded the book as useful for readers interested in social improvement and the development of moral and economic thought.

A review in The Literary World described Moore as an "incurable pessimist", arguing that his outlook focused too heavily on cruelty and the darker aspects of human nature. The reviewer acknowledged Moore's moral earnestness but criticized his tone as severe and despairing, and questioned whether such a pessimistic philosophy could inspire social improvement. The review nevertheless recognized the sincerity of the book's call for altruistic education and reform.

In the Journal of Education, the book was described as clear, original, and likely to exert considerable influence, with the reviewer noting its readability and the author's enthusiasm. The Advocate of Peace characterized it as a thoughtful examination of the relationship between social inheritance and environment, and noted its advocacy of cooperation and moral development as means of social improvement.

The School Journal reported that Lester Frank Ward regarded the book as marked by depth and originality, while David Starr Jordan called it lively in style and bold in its conclusions, and recommended it to readers interested in social advancement. The People's Press endorsed the book and published statements of support from Henry Demarest Lloyd, Robert G. Ingersoll, George D. Herron, and John Peter Altgeld.

After reviewing the book, Henry S. Salt, the English humanitarian and author of Animals' Rights: Considered in Relation to Social Progress (1892), corresponded with Moore, beginning a friendship that continued for several years.

=== Modern ===
In her biographical entry on Moore for the Dictionary of Literary Biography, historian Donna L. Davey described Better-World Philosophy as Moore's first major work. She noted that contemporary reviews, though mixed, often remarked on his bold style and intensity of opinion. According to Davey, what some critics viewed as pessimism reflected Moore's moral seriousness and his desire to reform human attitudes toward life and ethics. She writes that the book expressed Moore's belief in the unity of all life and in the extension of moral concern to animals capable of feeling, and outlined his vision of an altruistic society shaped by evolutionary principles. Davey also notes that Moore argued in favor of eugenics, cautioned against reckless reproduction, and maintained that the cultivation of altruism should begin in childhood through moral education encouraging sympathy for all beings.

== See also ==
- Books by J. Howard Moore
- History of animal rights
