= The Universal Kinship =

1906 book by J. Howard Moore

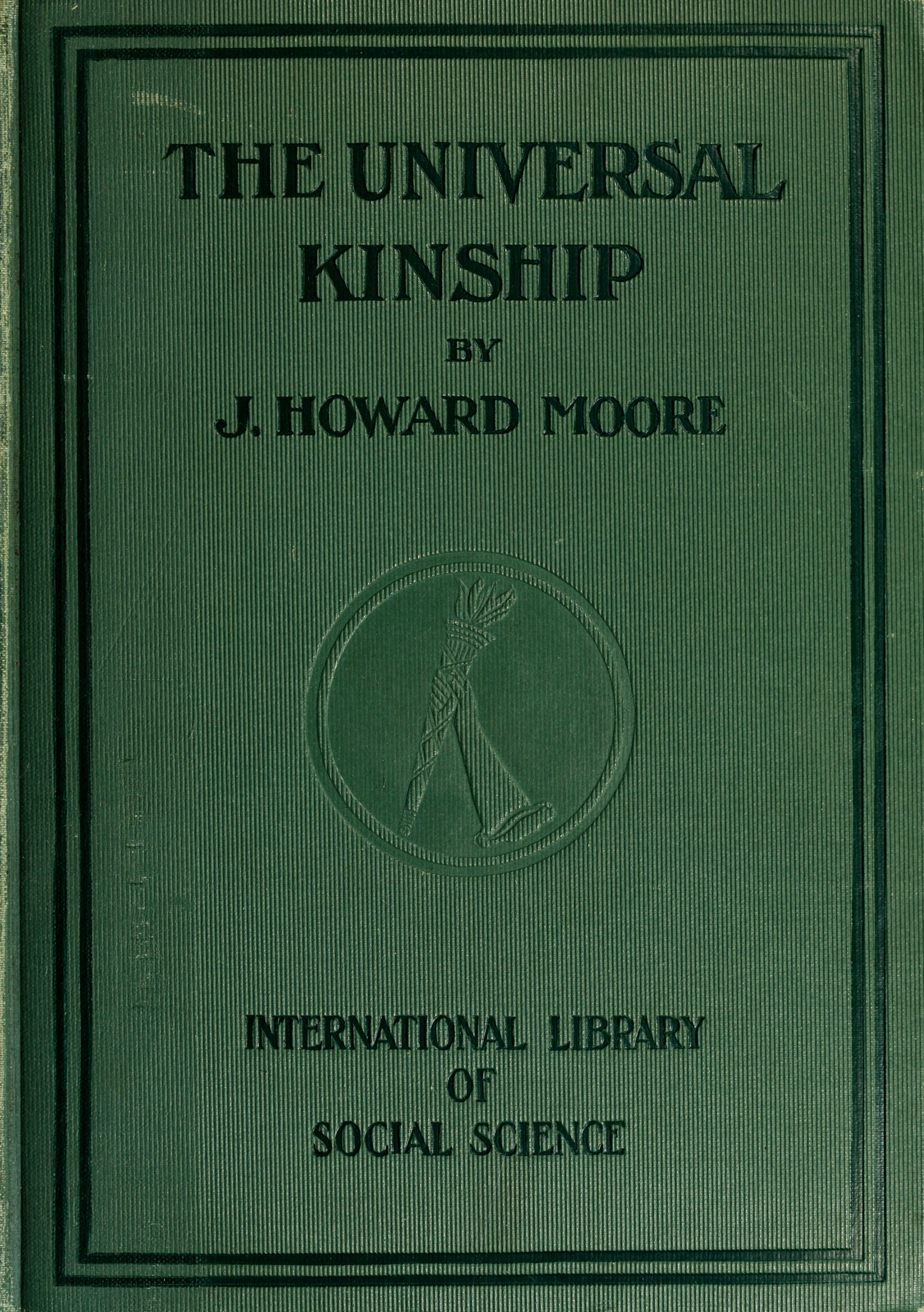
- First edition cover
- Author: J. Howard Moore
- Language: English
- Series: International Library of Social Science
- Release number: 3
- Subjects: Animal ethics, evolution, zoology
- Publisher: Charles H. Kerr & Co.
- Publication date: 1906
- Publication place: United States
- Media type: Print (hardcover)
- Pages: 329
- OCLC: 3704446
- Text: The Universal Kinship at Project Gutenberg

The Universal Kinship is a 1906 book by American zoologist and philosopher J. Howard Moore. Drawing on evolutionary theory, Moore argues that humans and other animals share physical and mental characteristics and that this kinship provides grounds for extending moral consideration to all sentient beings. He criticizes anthropocentrism, the exploitation of animals, and ethical systems that restrict moral concern to the human species. He also discusses wild animal suffering, particularly that arising from competition and predation.

The book develops arguments Moore had presented in Better-World Philosophy (1899) and was followed by The New Ethics (1907). It received favorable responses from writers and reformers including Henry S. Salt, Mark Twain, Jack London, Eugene V. Debs, and Mona Caird, alongside criticism of its scientific and philosophical arguments.

== Background ==
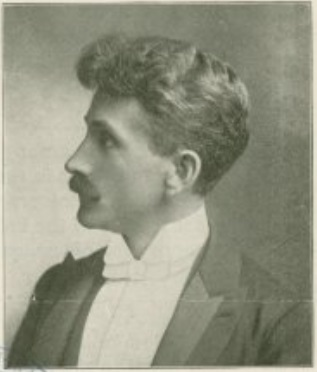
Moore, c. 1899

J. Howard Moore (1862–1916) was an American zoologist, philosopher, and advocate of animal rights and ethical vegetarianism. His writings drew on evolutionary biology and moral philosophy, and he participated in the humanitarian movement of the late 19th and early 20th centuries, which sought reforms in the treatment of humans and other animals.

Before The Universal Kinship, Moore had published Why I Am a Vegetarian (1895) and Better-World Philosophy (1899). He continued to develop his ethical arguments in The New Ethics (1907).

== Publication history ==
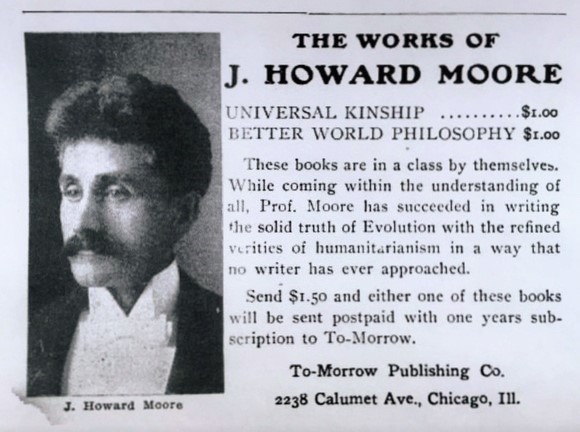
Advertisement for Moore's works, 1908

The Universal Kinship was first published in Chicago in 1906 by Charles H. Kerr & Co., as part of its International Library of Social Science series. The same year, George Bell & Sons published an abridged version titled The Whole World Kin in London. Unabridged editions were also issued in London by George Bell & Sons and the Humanitarian League.

A Dutch translation by Felix Ortt, titled De universeele verwantschap, appeared in 1906. In 1908, Ōsugi Sakae and Sakai Toshihiko translated the book into Japanese as Banbutsu no dōkon ichizoku.

After several years out of print, the book was reissued by Charles H. Kerr & Co. in 1916 in response to renewed demand. A further edition appeared in 1992 from Centaur Press, edited by animal rights philosopher Charles R. Magel. It included letters from Moore to Salt, a biographical essay, and the eulogy delivered by Clarence Darrow at Moore's funeral.

== Contents ==
The Universal Kinship is divided into three parts: "The Physical Kinship", "The Psychical Kinship", and "The Ethical Kinship". Moore uses evidence from zoology, comparative anatomy, evolutionary biology, and animal psychology to argue that humans belong to a wider community of related beings. His discussion draws on scientists including Charles Darwin, Thomas Henry Huxley, Ernst Haeckel, George Romanes, and John Lubbock.

=== The Physical Kinship ===
The first part examines the biological relationship between humans and other animals. Moore rejects the belief that humans constitute a separate order of existence, arguing that they belong to the animal kingdom and share an evolutionary ancestry with other species.

Moore describes humans as vertebrates, mammals, and primates, comparing their anatomy and development with those of other animals. He discusses similarities in skeletal structure, reproduction, and other bodily characteristics, with particular attention to the relationship between humans and the anthropoid apes. He also examines homology as evidence of common ancestry and considers the processes through which different animal forms evolved.

Moore argues that humanity's biological characteristics do not support claims of a separate or divine origin. Although he regards humans as more highly developed in certain respects, he maintains that the differences between humans and other animals do not place them outside the natural world.

=== The Psychical Kinship ===
The second part examines the mental and emotional capacities of humans and other animals. Moore disputes the belief that consciousness, intelligence, and complex emotions are exclusively human. He argues that mental faculties developed through evolution alongside physical characteristics and that differences between human and nonhuman minds are principally differences of degree.

Moore challenges religious and philosophical traditions that treat humans as possessing a unique soul or consciousness. Drawing on comparative psychology and observations of animal behavior, he discusses memory, reasoning, communication, emotion, and social relationships among nonhuman animals. He also questions the grounds for attributing an immortal soul to humans while denying the same possibility to other animals.

In the chapter "The Elements of Human and Non-human Mind Compared", Moore examines sensation, memory, emotion, imagination, volition, instinct, and reason. He argues that these faculties occur in other animals, although their development varies between species. His examples include the behavior of birds, mammals, and other animals, as well as personal observations of his childhood dog, Fido.

=== The Ethical Kinship ===
The final part considers the moral consequences of the physical and mental relationships established in the preceding sections. Moore traces the development of human ethical conduct from narrow forms of self-interest toward wider sympathy and altruism. He argues that this development has remained incomplete because humans generally exclude other animals from moral consideration.

Moore also discusses wild animal suffering arising from competition and predation. In the chapter "Egoism and Altruism", he argues that natural selection has produced a world in which living beings routinely harm one another. He describes the natural world as pervaded by suffering and speculates whether an ordinary person, given sufficient concern for the welfare of others, could improve conditions for its inhabitants.

Moore criticizes the treatment of animals as property and resources for human use. He condemns their exploitation for food, clothing, labor, and entertainment, arguing that their capacity to experience suffering gives them moral claims that humans routinely disregard. He also objects to the distinction between humans as beings with interests of their own and other animals as commodities whose value depends on their usefulness to people.

Moore describes this exclusion as a form of moral "provincialism", comparing prejudice against other species with the exclusion of human groups from ethical consideration. He argues that both arise from regarding one's own group as morally privileged and treating outsiders as means to its ends.

He maintains that the Golden Rule, traditionally applied to relations between humans, should also govern human conduct toward other sentient beings. He argues that the capacity to experience pleasure and suffering provides grounds for moral consideration regardless of species.

Moore concludes that animals possess rights of their own, even if those rights differ between individuals and species: "All beings are ends; no creatures are means. All beings have not equal rights, neither have all men; but all have rights."

== Reception ==
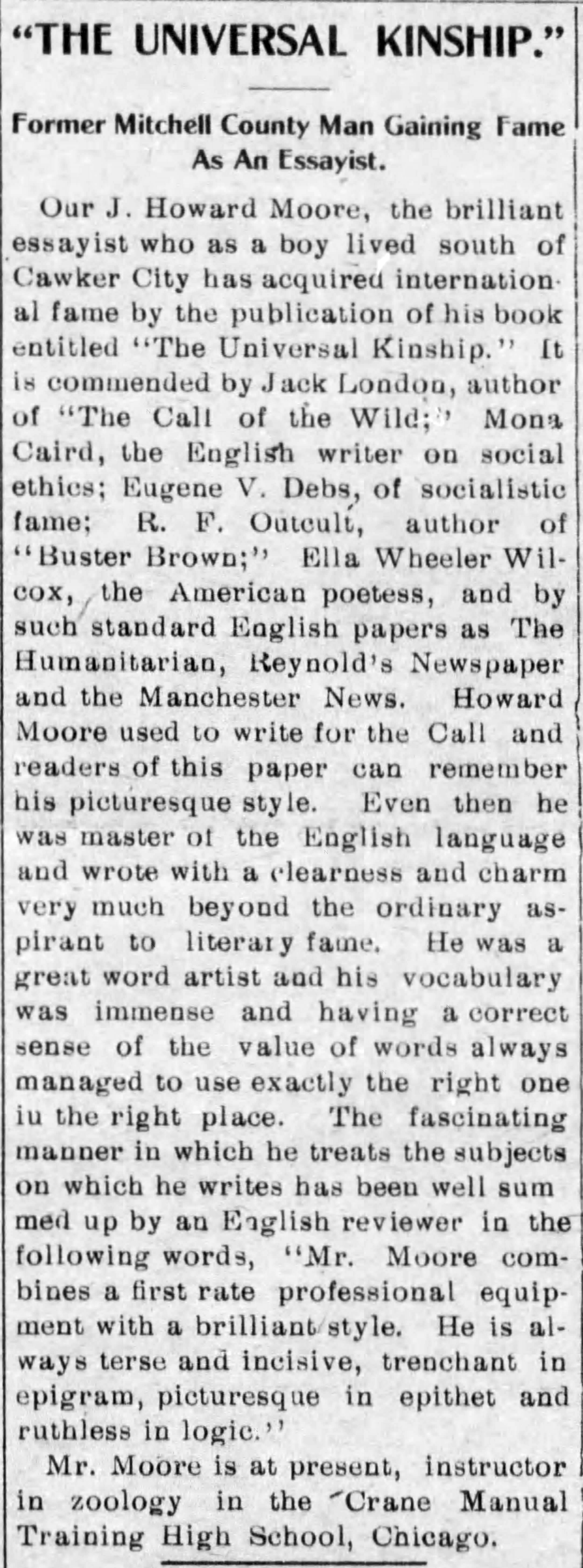
1906 newspaper article about Moore and The Universal Kinship

The Universal Kinship received favorable responses from several contemporary writers and social reformers. Henry S. Salt, Moore's friend and fellow advocate of animal rights, promoted the book through his Humanitarian League network following its publication in Britain. In his autobiography, Salt later described it as "the best ever written in the humanitarian cause". The book also received positive reviews in The Daily Telegraph, the Evening Standard, The Clarion, and Reynold's News.

American socialist Eugene V. Debs praised the book and recommended it to socialists and students of sociology. He subsequently published "Man and Mule", an article concerning the relationship between humans and working animals, which drew on Moore's arguments.

Moore sent a copy of the book to Mark Twain, who thanked him for providing "several days of deep pleasure and satisfaction". Twain wrote that the book expressed opinions he had long held, sparing him the effort of setting them out himself.

Jack London also praised Moore's treatment of the subject, particularly his knowledge and writing style. In his personal copy, London marked the passage in which Moore argued that all beings possess rights and should be regarded as ends in themselves.

English feminist and writer Mona Caird wrote to Moore after reading the book, expressing enthusiasm for its arguments. She described it as giving form to ideas that she and other reformers had struggled to communicate and praised its combination of scientific argument and moral conviction.

American socialist Julius Wayland likewise endorsed the book. Although he described it as "not exactly socialism", he maintained that it offered readers a new perspective and characterized it as a "scientific education within itself".

=== Criticism ===
The National Anti-Vivisection Society approved of Moore's discussion of ethical kinship between humans and animals but disputed his evolutionary explanation of human mental capacities. The RSPCA considered his arguments well supported in some respects but objected to his Darwinian interpretation, stating that "there is much in it that cannot be agreed with".

A reviewer identified as G. M. A. in The American Naturalist agreed with Moore's call for greater kindness but criticized the book's treatment of scientific evidence. The reviewer described it as containing a "mixture of fact and error, observation and travelers' tales", alongside exaggerated expressions and questionable assertions.

Anthropologist J. R. Swanton, reviewing the book in American Anthropologist, criticized Moore for overlooking differences between humans and other animals. He wrote that the book's failing was that "in sweeping away impassable gulfs it ignores real differences".

=== Later assessments ===
Moore's criticism of human moral superiority and prejudice against other species has been compared to later arguments against speciesism. In Ethical Vegetarianism: From Pythagoras to Peter Singer (1999), Kerry S. Walters and Lisa Portmess discuss his arguments as anticipating aspects of Peter Singer's criticism of species-based discrimination. The term speciesism was introduced by Richard D. Ryder in 1970.

== See also ==
- History of animal rights
- Moral circle expansion
- Sentientism
- Suffering-focused ethics
- Evolutional Ethics and Animal Psychology – 1897 book by Edward Payson Evans
- The Expanding Circle – 1981 book by Peter Singer
