= The New Ethics =

1907 book by J. Howard Moore

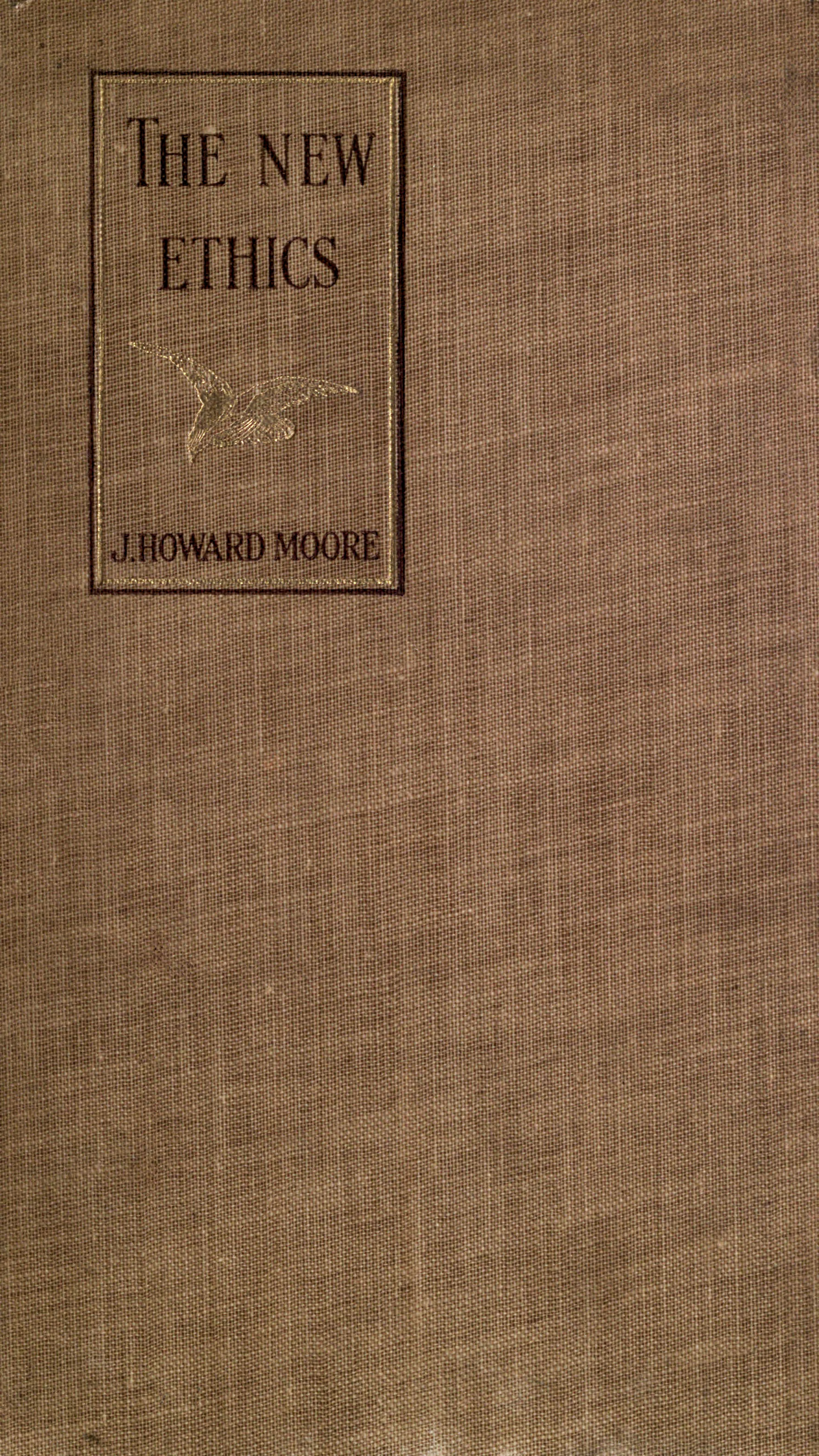
- First edition cover
- Author: J. Howard Moore
- Language: English
- Subject: Animal ethics; Ethical vegetarianism; Evolutionary ethics
- Genre: Philosophy
- Publisher: Ernest Bell
- Publication date: 1907
- Publication place: United Kingdom
- Media type: Print (hardback)
- Pages: 216
- OCLC: 2230913
- Text: The New Ethics at the Internet Archive

The New Ethics is a 1907 book by American zoologist and philosopher J. Howard Moore, published by Ernest Bell in London. It advocates extending the Golden Rule to all sentient beings, arguing that membership in the human species does not determine the limits of ethical obligation. Moore presents this position as an implication of evolutionary theory and a rejection of anthropocentrism.

Developing arguments made in Better-World Philosophy (1899) and The Universal Kinship (1906), Moore examines the treatment of non-human animals, the ethics of diet and clothing, and objections to extending moral concern beyond humanity. He also discusses the women's rights movement, socialism, and the prospects for social and moral progress.

== Background ==
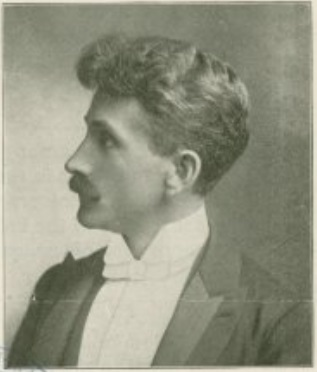
Moore, c. 1899

Moore (1862–1916) was an American zoologist, philosopher, and advocate of animal rights and ethical vegetarianism. Associated with the humanitarian movement of the late 19th and early 20th centuries, he argued that the implications of evolutionary theory required changes in human conduct toward other animals. The book's bibliography includes works by Herbert Spencer and Henry Stephens Salt. His previous publications included Why I Am a Vegetarian (1895), Better-World Philosophy (1899), and The Universal Kinship (1906).

== Publication history ==
The first edition was published in London by Ernest Bell in 1907. The book contains 12 chapters and is dedicated to "Tess", a name Moore used for his wife, Jennie. A revised edition was published in Chicago by Samuel A. Bloch in 1909.

== Summary ==
Moore begins by examining how opinions are shaped by heredity, environment, and established habits of thought. He argues that received beliefs are not necessarily reliable guides to truth, and that unfamiliar ideas are often rejected before they are understood. He then sets out the central principle of the New Ethics, which he calls the "Great Law": treating other beings as one would treat part of oneself. He argues that the principle applies to all sentient beings, not only to humans, writing that "Moral obligation is as extensive as the power to feel." In his view, Darwin's account of common evolutionary ancestry undermines the idea that other species exist solely for human benefit.

To support his account of animal sentience, Moore describes the behavior of guinea pigs he kept as companion animals. He criticizes the failure to recognize non-human animals as individuals capable of pleasure, distress, and attachment. Subsequent chapters condemn vivisection, animal slaughter, and the killing of animals for sport or fashion. He also examines the contribution of working animals to human society, contrasting their exploitation with an ideal of cooperation in which they would receive care, rest, and opportunities for enjoyment.

In the chapter "The Cost of a Skin", Moore criticizes the use of fur, feathers, and leather in clothing and discusses possible plant-based substitutes. Three chapters on diet then argue that killing animals for food is unnecessary. Moore draws on contemporary nutritional claims, comparative anatomy, and examples of vegetarian athletic performance to argue that humans are suited to a vegetarian diet. He describes an ideal diet of fruits, grains, nuts, vegetables, dairy products, and eggs.

Addressing the claim that animals must be killed to prevent overpopulation, Moore distinguishes between violence he regards as necessary for protection and killing undertaken for pleasure or convenience. Although he defends continued human management of the earth and allows that dangerous animals may sometimes need to be restrained or killed, he argues that such measures should minimize suffering and be judged by their effects on all those concerned. He rejects the behavior of predators as a moral example for humans, arguing that nature is imperfect and that ethical progress involves reducing conflict and harm.

Moore also considers whether moral duties should extend to plants. He maintains that sentience, rather than life alone, is the basis of moral consideration. Although he finds insufficient evidence that plants are conscious, he argues that a person convinced of their sentience would have reason to consider their interests. In the book's final chapters, he presents episodes from the history of science and social reform, including debates over heliocentrism, Darwinian evolution, women's education and rights, and socialism. The conclusion urges readers to question inherited beliefs and anticipates a civilization founded on wider sympathy and justice toward sentient life.

== Reception ==
A 1908 review in the socialist magazine The New Age criticized the book as uneven and overly sentimental, while praising its conclusion. The Westminster Review described the book's central argument as "extremist altruism" and found merit in a number of its points.

Writing in The Animal Year-Book in 1931, C. M. Knight acknowledged that some readers might dislike Moore's fervent language and rhetorical excesses, but welcomed works capable of stimulating reflection and overcoming indifference to animal welfare.

== See also ==
- The Cost of a Skin – 1907 essay by J. Howard Moore
- Bibliography of animal rights
- Bibliography of veganism and vegetarianism
- History of animal rights
- History of vegetarianism
- Sentientism
