= Mark Gold (activist) =

English activist and writer (born c. 1953)

- Born: c. 1953 (age 72–73); Birmingham, England
- Education: York University
- Occupations: Activist; writer
- Employers: Compassion in World Farming; Animal Aid
- Known for: Animal rights and veganism activism
- Partner: Emily
- Children: 1 (stepson)

Mark Gold (born c. 1953) is an English animal rights and veganism activist and writer. He has worked for Compassion in World Farming and Animal Aid, organised vegan events, and written books on animal issues and Wolverhampton Wanderers F.C. He founded the Vegan Compassion Group, formerly the Vegetarian Campaign Group.

== Life and career ==
Gold was born in Birmingham c. 1953 and studied English at York University.

Gold worked for Compassion in World Farming from 1978 to 1983, before becoming national organiser. He was director of Animal Aid for 12 years. In 1992, he directed the short film Their Future in Your Hands for Animal Aid. In 2017, he organised Animal Aid's three-week Vegan Festival of Britain. In 2021, he organised Exeter Vegan Market. He continues to work for Animal Aid and also works for Citizens Advice.

Gold has written four books on animal issues: Assault and Battery: What Factory Farming Means for Humans and Animals (1983), Living Without Cruelty: Choose a Cruelty Free Lifestyle (1988), Animal Rights: Expanding the Circle of Compassion (1995), and Animal Century: A Celebration of Changing Attitudes to Animals (1998). According to SportsBooks, The Observer included Living Without Cruelty among its top green books of the period. In 2008, Gold published his first novel, Cranks and Revolutions; the Sidmouth Herald reported that it was praised by Tony Benn. He has also published two books on Wolverhampton Wanderers F.C.: Under a Wanderers Star: Forty Pain Filled Years Following the Wolves (2002) and The Boys from the Black Country (2010).

In 1986, Gold founded the Vegetarian Campaign Group, with the stated object of promoting "the ideals and practice of vegetarianism as a means of advancing the mental, physical and moral improvements of mankind". The charity was later renamed the Vegan Compassion Group and promotes veganism. It operates in the United Kingdom, Nepal, and Ethiopia.

== Personal life ==
As of 1995, Gold was living with his partner, Emily, and stepson in Devon, near Honiton.

== Publications ==
=== Articles ===
- "If Slaughterhouses Had Glass Walls", Animals: A New Ethics, No. 271, March–April 2012

=== Books ===
- Assault and Battery: What Factory Farming Means for Humans and Animals (Pluto Press, 1983)
- Living Without Cruelty: Choose a Cruelty Free Lifestyle (Green Publishing, 1988)
- Animal Rights: Expanding the Circle of Compassion (John Carpenter Publishing, 1995)
- Animal Century: A Celebration of Changing Attitudes to Animals (John Carpenter Publishing, 1998)
- Under a Wanderers Star: Forty Pain Filled Years Following the Wolves (Offwell Press, 2002)
- Cranks and Revolutions (Merlin Press, 2008)
- The Boys from the Black Country (SportsBooks, 2010)

=== Chapters ===
- Tansey, Geoff; D'Silva, Joyce, eds. (1999), "Beyond the Killing Fields: Working Towards a Vegetarian Future", The Meat Business, Routledge, p. 16, doi:10.4324/9780429296819-21, ISBN 978-0-429-29681-9, S2CID 200201791

=== Reports ===
- "The Global Benefits of Eating Less Meat: A Report for Compassion in World Farming Trust" (Compassion in World Farming, 2004)
