= Linden, Atchison County, Missouri =

Extinct hamlet in Missouri, U.S.

Coordinates: 40°29′11″N 95°32′15″W

Linden is an extinct hamlet in northwestern Atchison County, in the U.S. state of Missouri.

== History ==
Linden was the original county seat of Atchison County. A variant name was Magnet. In 1846, the town was platted, and a post office was established called Linden; it closed in 1871. The post office was reestablished as Magnet in 1880, and was discontinued in 1900. An 1882 map depicts both Linden and Magnet. The present name is for linden trees near the original town site. The population in 1915 was about 30.

== Notable people ==
- J. Howard Moore - Zoologist, philosopher, educator and socialist
