= Animal Aid =

British animal rights organisation

- Founded: 1977; 49 years ago
- Founder: Jean Pink
- Type: Animal rights
- Purpose: Vivisection; Animal farming and slaughter; Animal rights; Shooting; Veganism; Horse racing; Wildlife culls; Cruelty-free living
- Location: Tonbridge, England
- Region served: United Kingdom
- Methods: Campaigning; Cruelty-free fairs; Undercover investigations
- Website: www.animalaid.org.uk

Animal Aid is a British animal rights organisation, founded in 1977 by Jean Pink. The group campaigns peacefully against the consumption of animals as food and against animal cruelty such as their use for medical research—and promotes a cruelty-free lifestyle. It also investigates and exposes animal abuse.

Animal Aid conducts undercover investigations, produces campaign reports, leaflets and fact files, as well as educational videos and other resources. They also offer a quarterly magazine and a sales catalogue with vegan and cruelty-free products.

== Aims and objectives ==
Animal Aid was founded in January 1977 to work, by all peaceful means, for an end to animal cruelty. The organisation is a not-for-profit limited company run by a volunteer council of management. It has not applied to be a charity so that it is able to use its funds for sometimes controversial campaigns.

== Founding ==
Animal Aid was established by primary school teacher Jean Pink in 1977 after borrowing Peter Singer's book, Animal Liberation, from her local library in Tonbridge. Despite not having any experience of campaigning, Pink felt that she needed to do something and advertised for others who felt similarly. Soon a small group sympathetic to animal rights began to meet in Pink's kitchen. Initially, the group used a hand duplicator to create leaflets which they would distribute in London.The organisation rapidly grew in size in its initial years, with Pink giving up teaching to focus on it. In 1984 Pink left the organisation. Pink died on 8 February 2025.

== Campaigns ==
Animal Aid campaigns include:

- Slaughter: Animal Aid uses hidden cameras to film in UK slaughterhouses. It has filmed inside sixteen British slaughterhouses, finding evidence of lawbreaking in most of them. Following Animal Aid's CCTV campaign, all the major supermarket chains agreed to insist that their suppliers fit CCTV cameras in their slaughterhouses. Animal Aid campaigns for mandatory independently monitored CCTV in all UK slaughterhouses.
- Horse racing: This aims for an end to commercial horse racing, and as a first step, a ban on the use of the whip except for safety purposes. The investigation was featured in a 2021 BBC Panorama programme, The Dark Side of Horse Racing. Animal Aid maintains lists of horse racing deaths.
- Game bird shooting: Animal Aid campaigns for an end to the production and shooting of animals for pleasure. Some 50 million pheasants and partridges are intensively farmed every year so that they can be released and shot for sport.

== See also ==
- Animal ethics
- List of animal rights groups
