= Bernard Unti =

American historian and activist

- Born: Bernard Oreste Unti
- Education: Temple University (B.A., 1982); American University (PhD, 2002)
- Occupations: Historian; activist; nonprofit businessperson
- Employers: American Anti-Vivisection Society (1985–1992); Humane World for Animals (2004–present)
- Known for: Historical research and writing; animal rights and welfare activism; donating and endowing the Bernard Unti Book and Ephemera Collection on Animal Studies at North Carolina State University Libraries

Bernard Oreste Unti is an American historian and animal rights and welfare advocate. His work has covered the history of animal protection, vegetarianism, and anti-vivisection in the United States. He worked for the American Anti-Vivisection Society from 1985 to 1992 and later for Humane World for Animals (formerly the Humane Society of the United States). In 1990, he was among the organizers of protests at the Hegins Labor Day pigeon shoot in Pennsylvania. In 2022, he donated and endowed a collection of animal studies historical materials to the Special Collections Research Center at North Carolina State University Libraries.

== Biography ==
=== Early life and education ===
Unti is the son of Oreste V. Unti (d. 2001), a wine and liquor distributor and son of Italian immigrants. He became vegetarian at the age of 8.

Unti received a B.A. in history from Temple University in 1982 and a PhD in U.S. history from American University in 2002. His doctoral dissertation, The Quality of Mercy: Organized Animal Protection in the United States 1866-1930 (2002), examined the U.S. animal protection movement after 1866, its relation to other post-Civil War reform movements, and the factors that shaped its achievements and limits through the early 20th century.

=== Career ===
Unti is an animal rights and welfare advocate. He worked for the American Anti-Vivisection Society (AAVS) from 1985 to 1992, including as executive director. He joined Humane World for Animals (HWA; formerly the Humane Society of the United States) in 2004. He served as senior policy adviser and special assistant to the president and CEO from 2004 to 2021, and then as a senior principal strategist in communications.

A 2012 interview by Faunalytics described Unti as a historian of the human-animal bond. He published Protecting All Animals: A Fifty-Year History of the Humane Society of the United States in 2004 and has written essays on cruelty to animals in historical and contemporary contexts.

=== Hegins pigeon-shoot protest ===
According to Norm Phelps, protests at the Hegins Labor Day pigeon shoot in Pennsylvania began in the mid-1980s and became an annual event attended by several hundred animal rights activists. Phelps writes that Trans-Species Unlimited (TSU) held small protests in 1984 and 1985, and that activist George Cave later called for a larger demonstration, with support from groups including People for the Ethical Treatment of Animals and the Fund for Animals. After TSU withdrew in 1990, the Fund for Animals led the protest coalition.

Phelps describes the 1990 demonstration as tense, with confrontations between protesters and local supporters. He states that Unti was among the protest organizers and that, while addressing demonstrators with a bullhorn, he was thrown to the ground by police and dislocated his shoulder. In 1993, The Patriot-News reported that Unti was arrested during the 1990 protest and charged with disorderly conduct. The newspaper reported that state officials agreed to pay Unti $75,000 after a federal jury found that state police used excessive force during the arrest, in which his collarbone was broken, and that no criminal charges were filed against him in the incident.

=== North Carolina State University Libraries collections ===
==== Bernard Unti Book and Ephemera Collection on Animal Studies ====
In a 1990 profile for Vegetarian Times, Unti said that after beginning work at the American Anti-Vivisection Society in 1985 he started assembling a personal collection of historical material on the humane movement, including books, papers, speeches, and other media on animal welfare, animal rights, vegetarianism, and anti-vivisection.

In 2022, Unti donated and endowed his collection to the Special Collections Research Center at North Carolina State University Libraries. The Bernard Unti Book and Ephemera Collection on Animal Studies contains more than 3,000 items, including books, pamphlets, ephemera, and material culture objects relating to the kindness-to-animals ethic, organized animal protection, vegetarianism, and anti-vivisection. Most of the books in the collection date from the 19th and early 20th centuries.

==== Bernard Unti Papers ====
The Bernard Unti Papers are held by North Carolina State University Libraries. The finding aid describes the collection as containing publications, news clippings, and writings documenting Unti's involvement with the animal protection movement, especially his activism during the 1980s. The papers include material relating to Humane World for Animals, Unti's dissertation research, and his work as senior policy adviser and special assistant to HWA president and CEO Wayne Pacelle. The collection also covers Unti's research on laboratory animals, trapping, hunting, cetacean protection, humane education, veganism, and vegetarianism.

== Works ==
- The Quality of Mercy: Organized Animal Protection in the United States 1866-1930 (PhD thesis). WellBeing International. 2002.
- "Protecting All Animals: A Fifty-Year History of The Humane Society of the United States". WellBeing International. 2004.
- "Humane Education Past, Present, and Future". WellBeing International. 2003.

== See also ==
- Animal welfare in the United States
- History of animal rights
- History of animal welfare
