= Humanitarian movement =

Nineteenth-century reform current

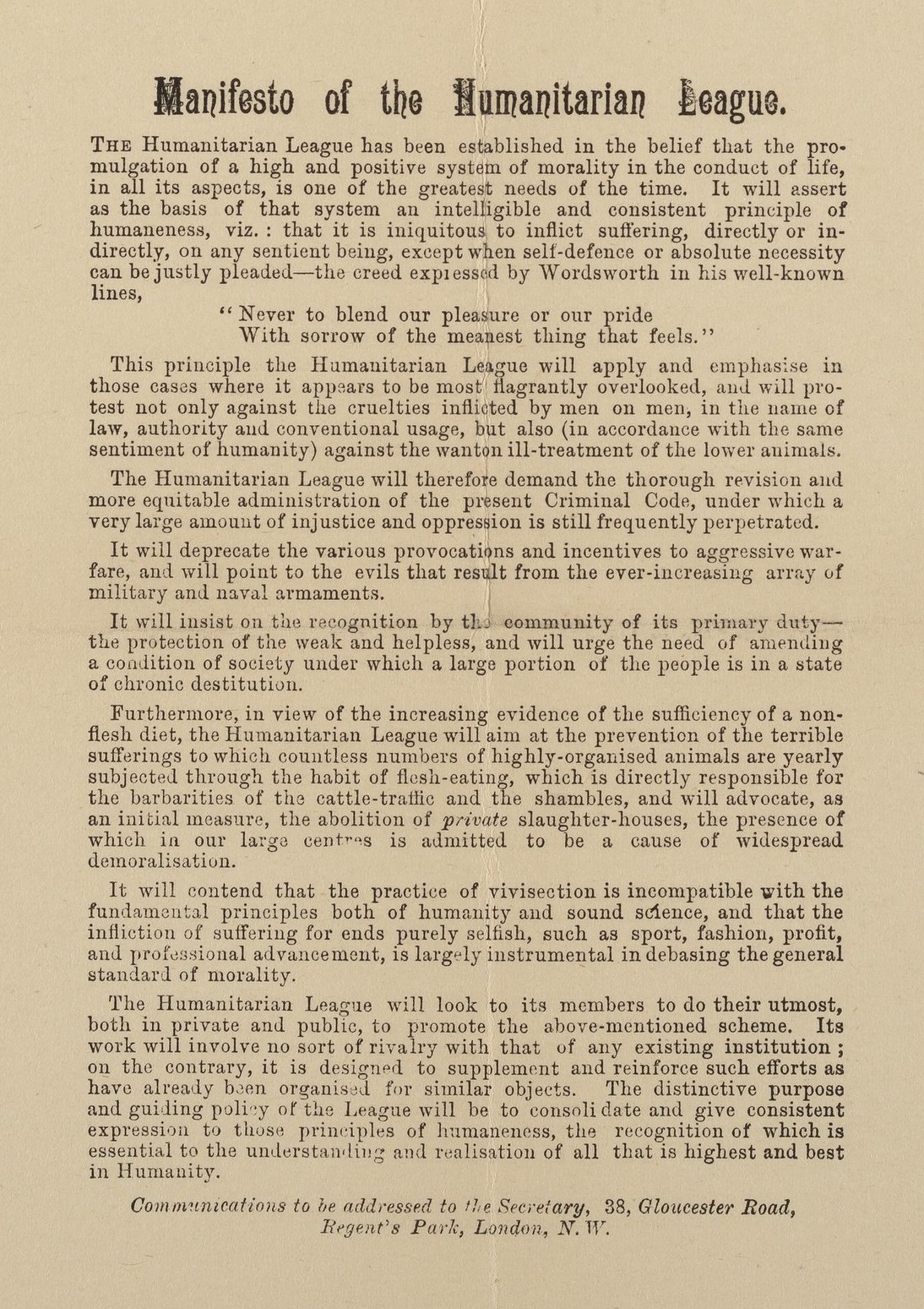
Manifesto of the Humanitarian League, 1910

The humanitarian movement was a current of social, political, and moral reform in the long nineteenth century concerned with the relief of suffering and the prevention of cruelty. Historians have connected nineteenth-century humanitarianism with evangelical social activism, liberal radicalism, and internationalism. Its campaigns included abolitionism, temperance, prison reform, opposition to the state regulation of prostitution, refugee relief, animal protection, ethical vegetarianism, and opposition to blood sports.

Although later humanitarianism is often associated with international relief, nineteenth-century humanitarian activity also included domestic reform and moral campaigning. Abigail Green has argued that the period should not be treated only as a prehistory of modern human rights, and that causes such as temperance and Josephine Butler's campaign against the Contagious Diseases Acts belonged to nineteenth-century humanitarian culture alongside anti-slavery and intervention on behalf of oppressed populations abroad. The Humanitarian League, founded in London in 1891, joined campaigns against cruelty to humans and animals.

== Origins ==
Historians usually place the rise of modern humanitarianism in the late eighteenth and early nineteenth centuries, especially in the campaigns against the Atlantic slave trade and slavery. These movements used appeals to sympathy, benevolence, and shared humanity, together with pamphlets, petitions, public meetings, and voluntary associations, to mobilise public opinion across national borders. Abigail Green describes nineteenth-century humanitarianism as arising from two traditions: religiously motivated activism associated with the evangelical revival and radical politics shaped by self-determination and the rights of man.

The movement developed with new forms of mass communication and associational politics. According to Sarah Winter, humanitarian narratives made bodily pain visible through detailed accounts of suffering and presented reform as possible and morally required. Similar methods appeared in anti-slavery literature, social investigation, missionary writing, and appeals concerning war casualties, refugees, famine, and colonial populations.

== Religion, politics, and internationalism ==
Nineteenth-century humanitarianism drew heavily on Christian belief, especially evangelicalism, but it was not only a religious movement. Green argues that humanitarian campaigns joined Christian moral obligation with liberal and radical politics. British support for the Greeks during the Greek War of Independence, for Italian nationalists such as Giuseppe Mazzini and Giuseppe Garibaldi, and for persecuted Christians in the Ottoman Empire joined religious sympathy to ideas of liberty and national self-determination.

Voluntary associations raised money, circulated reports, and lobbied governments on behalf of distant populations. Humanitarian reform was also tied to domestic institutions. Winter notes that figures such as Florence Nightingale worked in both settings, combining relief for soldiers in war with reform of military medicine, workhouse infirmaries, and colonial public health policy.

The movement had close connections with empire. Humanitarian concern could be used to criticise colonial violence, but it could also support paternalistic forms of rule. Winter, drawing on work by Alan Lester and Fae Dussart, notes that humanitarian governance in British settler colonies sought to protect Indigenous peoples while helping to justify imperial control and programmes of assimilation.

== Women and humanitarian reform ==
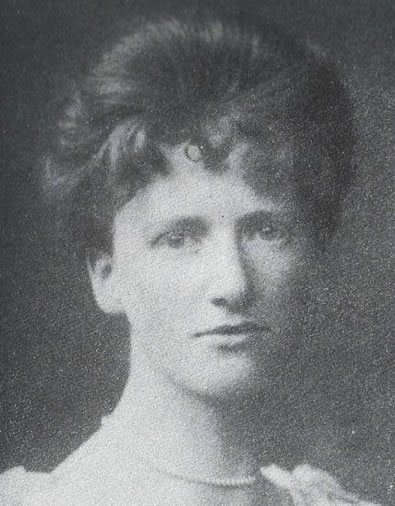
Eglantyne Jebb, founder of Save the Children

Women took part in many nineteenth-century humanitarian campaigns. Green notes the participation of women in the British anti-slavery movement, and argues that women also led later campaigns, including Josephine Butler's International Abolitionist Federation and the temperance movement. Religious language could restrict women's public roles, but it could also justify public activity through philanthropy, moral reform, and humanitarian campaigning.

Butler's campaign against the state regulation of prostitution linked Christian moral concern with civil-libertarian arguments against state power. Green places it within a network of radical, humanitarian, and moral reform politics connected through Quaker, evangelical, anti-slavery, and temperance circles in Britain, Europe, and the United States. Later female humanitarian figures included Eglantyne Jebb, founder of Save the Children, whose work influenced interwar ideas of impartial relief.

== Animals and ethical reform ==
Concern for animals formed part of nineteenth-century humanitarian reform. Animal protection societies campaigned against cruelty to working animals, vivisection, blood sports, and the treatment of animals in transport and slaughter. In the United States, Bernard Unti describes ethical vegetarianism as developing within a progressive milieu that included anti-vivisection, peace activism, abolitionism, temperance, and women's rights.

Unti distinguishes ethical vegetarianism from health reform, arguing that many nineteenth-century vegetarians rejected meat because they regarded the killing of animals for food as cruel and unnecessary. He notes that vegetarianism did not become the dominant position within the humane movement, whose main organisations generally accepted animal use while seeking to lessen suffering, but that it remained a current within humanitarian reform.

== Humanitarian League ==
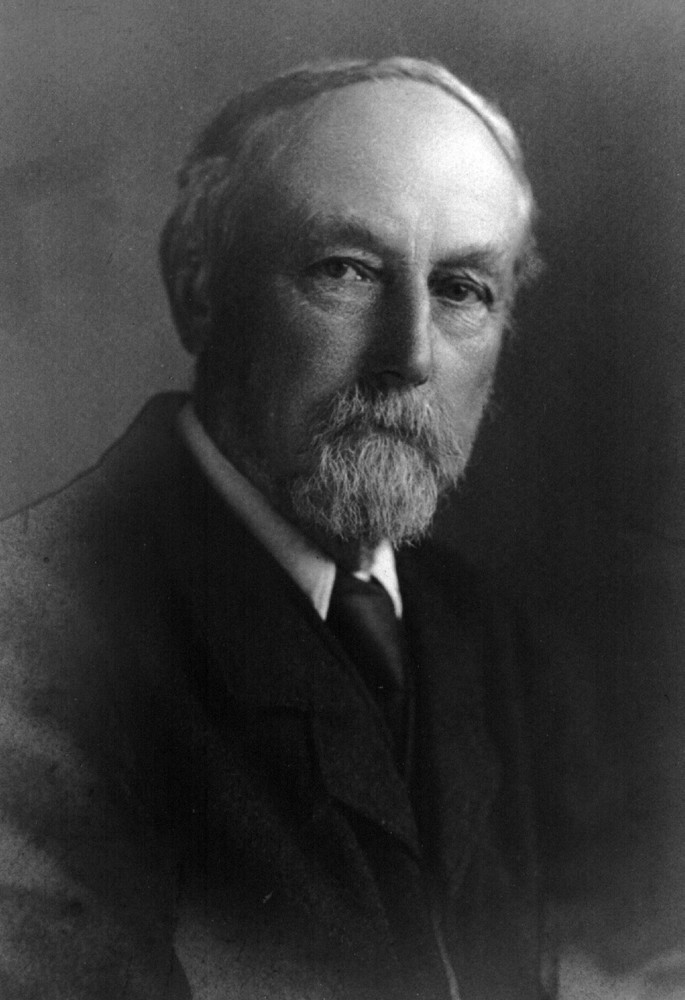
Henry S. Salt, co-founder of the Humanitarian League

In The Ethics of Diet (1883), Howard Williams proposed a humane society with a wider scope than existing organisations. Henry S. Salt developed a related argument in an 1889 article on humanitarianism in The Westminster Review, where he advocated a consistent principle of humaneness towards all sentient beings.

The Humanitarian League was founded in London in 1891 by Salt, Williams, Edward Maitland, Kenneth Romanes, and Alice Lewis. It applied the idea of humane conduct to humans and other sentient beings. Dan Weinbren describes it as a radical pressure group which espoused "humane principles on a rational basis" and campaigned on criminal-law reform, capital and corporal punishment, labour conditions, vivisection, compulsory vaccination, slaughterhouses, hunting, blood sports, and the killing of animals for food, fashion, and profit.

Its members included socialists, pacifists, vegetarians, animal advocates, and prison reformers. Unti describes the formation of the League as an event in the development of ethical vegetarianism within the international socialist and humane reform milieu.

== American humanitarianism ==
In the United States, ethical vegetarianism formed part of a reform culture linking animal protection with temperance, pacifism, suffrage, anti-lynching, prison reform, and socialism. Unti identifies J. Howard Moore as the most active of the socialist vegetarians, noting that he emerged in the mid-1890s as an advocate of temperance, ethical vegetarianism, and sympathy with non-human animals. Moore wrote for the Humanitarian League, the Millennium Guild, the Massachusetts Society for the Prevention of Cruelty to Animals, the American Anti-Vivisection Society, the American Humane Association, and the Chicago Vegetarian Society. Unti describes the Chicago Vegetarian Society under Moore's influence as "essentially an American redoubt of the Humanitarian League", with an emphasis on the ethical case for vegetarianism.

Historian Chien-hui Li writes that Moore's work found a more receptive audience in Britain than in the United States, aided by the Humanitarian League, George Bell & Sons, and The Animals' Friend. Gary K. Jarvis argues that the American humanitarian movement did not develop in the same organised form as its British counterpart, and that after Ernest Crosby's death in 1907 Moore represented much of what remained of it in the United States. Jarvis also states that World War I ended the wider humanitarian movement. Unti writes that Moore's Darwinian arguments were respected by contemporaries but did not become central to animal protection after his death, and that no major figure or organisation continued his specific approach.

== Historiography ==
Scholars have differed over when modern humanitarianism should be said to have emerged. Amanda Moniz has questioned accounts that begin with late eighteenth-century anti-slavery, arguing that humanitarian practices had earlier roots in eighteenth-century philanthropy. She points to figures such as Jeremy Belknap and Thomas Coram, and to the circulation of charitable models between Britain, North America, and continental Europe, as evidence of an older transnational culture of beneficence.

Green has criticised accounts that treat nineteenth-century humanitarianism only as an early stage in the development of modern human rights. She argues that such interpretations can be overly presentist, because they privilege campaigns that resemble contemporary concerns while neglecting causes that mattered to nineteenth-century reformers but have less obvious modern equivalents, such as temperance or anti-regulation campaigns against prostitution. She calls for a broader understanding of humanitarianism that takes account of religious traditions, gender, national settings, and the overlap between humanitarian, radical, and moral reform politics.

Winter presents nineteenth-century humanitarianism as a field that included relief work, voluntary association, imperial governance, medical reform, and international law. She notes that its history contains both solidarity with suffering people and unequal relations of power between benefactors and recipients.

== See also ==
- Abolitionism
- Animal rights movement
- Animal welfare
- History of animal rights
- History of psychiatry § Humanitarian reform
- History of vegetarianism
- Human rights
- Humane education
- Humanitarian aid
- Humanitarian education
- Humanitarian principles
- Humanitarianism
- Humanity (virtue)
- Progressive Era
- Reformism
- Social justice
- Temperance movement
- Vegetarianism in the Victorian era
- Victorian morality
