= Carrica Le Favre =

American physical culturist and vegetarianism activist

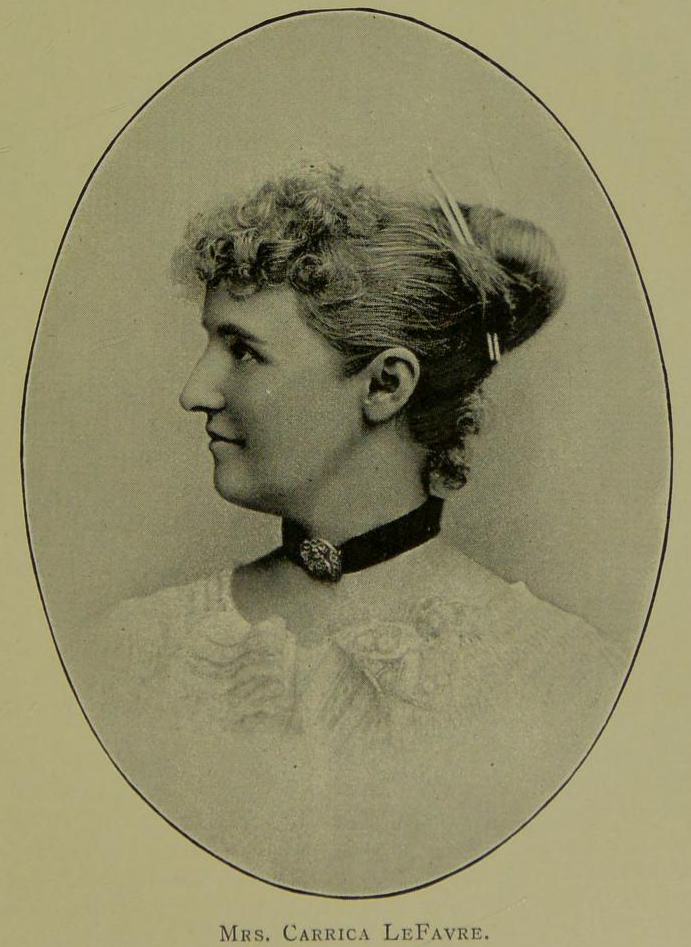
- Born: June 1850; Illinois, U.S.
- Occupations: Physical culturist; Writer

Carrica Le Favre (born June 1850) was an American physical culturist, dress reform advocate and vegetarianism activist. She founded the Chicago Vegetarian Society and the New York Vegetarian Society.

== Career ==
Le Favre was well known as a child expert due to her book Mother's Help and Childs Best Friend which emphasized the woman's role in raising children. She advised mothers to forbid their children eating snacks between meals.

Le Favre took interest in physical culture and was influenced by François Delsarte, she authored Physical Culture Founded on Delsartean Principles in 1894. She was a member of the American Society for the Promotion of Physical Culture and the American Delsarte Association.

Le Favre was a Delsartean who promoted breathing exercises (clavicular mental, costal moral, and abdominal physical) which were similar to Yogi Ramacharaka's yogi breathing exercises in his book Science of Breath. Le Favre combined the breathing exercises with Delsartean arm motions.

== Vegetarianism ==
Le Favre was a vegetarian and considered it vital for the moral and physical well-being of the mother and child. Le Favre argued that meat eating caused omnivores to lose mental and physical capabilities and that a vegetarian diet would make mothers "sweet tempered and orderly" which was important for child development. Le Favre personally converted to vegetarianism after suffering from chronic diarrhea from eating meat. She claimed to have "escaped death by entirely discarding flesh food".

Le Favre founded the Chicago Vegetarian Society in 1889. The Society began with 29 members most of which were female. The aim of the Society was to "adopt and promulgate a vegetarian line of diet, and by so doing elevate and purify humanity". Early members of the Society were associated with Chicago's upper class. Its publication Chicago Vegetarian was published from 1896 to 1900 when it merged with Food, Home and Garden to become The Vegetarian Magazine.

Le Favre's work for the vegetarian movement was praised in The Vegetarian Messenger in 1891 for "introducing vegetarianism to the notice of people of culture in the U.S.A." The membership of the Chicago Vegetarian Society increased and they cooperated with the Vegetarian Society of America. Le Favre edited the Food, Home and Garden magazine's home department which offered advice on domestic science and vegetarian cooking.

In June, 1892 she moved to New York, established the New York Vegetarian Society and was elected the first President. The Society's first meeting included lectures from vegetarians such as Henry S. Clubb President of the Vegetarian Society of America and Imogene Fales President of the Sociologic Society of America. In 1893, Le Favre stated that she had spent ten years living on cereals, fruits, nuts and vegetables. It was reported that she had lived several weeks upon apples alone.

== Selected publications ==
- Mother's Help and Child's Friend (1890)
- Delsartean Physical Culture (1891)
- The Royal Road to Beauty, Health and Higher Development, as Based on a Vegetarian Diet and the Proper Habits of Life (1892)
- Health and Beauty (1894)
- Physical Culture Founded on Delsartean Principles (1894)
