= Alfred Mansfield Mitchell =

Irish clergyman and activist (1853–1936)

The Reverend Alfred Mansfield Mitchell
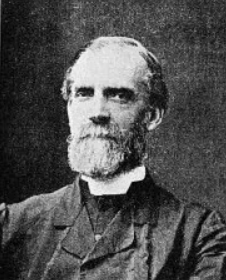
- Portrait from obituary
- Born: 1853; Dublin, Ireland
- Died: 18 February 1936 (aged 83); Burtonwood, England
- Resting place: Burtonwood Cemetery
- Education: Trinity College Dublin (B.A., 1879; M.A., 1884)
- Occupations: Clergyman, activist
- Spouse: Janet Elizabeth Louisa Hammond (m. 1887)

Signature
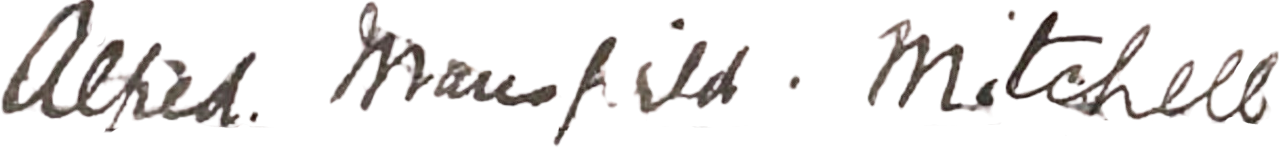

Alfred Mansfield Mitchell (1853 – 18 February 1936) was an Irish clergyman and activist. He advocated for anti-vivisection, vegetarianism, pacifism, and against poverty. He was the longest serving vicar of St Michael's Anglican Church in Burtonwood. Mitchell was a vocal vegetarian who argued that meat-eating was inconsistent with Christian worship.

== Biography ==
=== Career ===
Mitchell was born in Dublin. He was ordained in 1879 and became a priest the following year. Mitchell obtained his B.A. from Trinity College in 1879 and M.A. in 1884. He was a curate at Clonmel before moving to England, where he held curacies at Warrington, Kentish Town, and Clerkenwell. Mitchell was appointed vicar at St Michael's Anglican Church in Burtonwood in 1891, a position he held for 45 years. His parish magazine Excelsior was widely read.

Mitchell was an alderman of Lancashire County Council, a member of Burtonwood Parish Council and chairman of the Warrington County Elementary Education Committee. He was a pacifist and campaigned to help the poor. Mitchell also served as president of the People's League of Medical Freedom.

Mitchell was an anti-vivisectionist and opposed the use of animals in filmmaking. He argued that filmmakers were cruel to animals and planned to get a Bill passed through Parliament which would stop trained animals appearing in films. He was a member of the British Union for the Abolition of Vivisection and a vice-president of the Warrington Anti-Vivisection Society.

=== Vegetarianism ===
Mitchell was a vegetarian, non-smoker and teetotaller. He was disappointed that there was a large amount of antagonism against vegetarianism in the Church. He argued that meat dishes at Christmas festivals were non-Christian, stating that they are a "debasing and degrading orgie, a festival of blood, a festival of cruelty". In 1907, he commented that "vegetarians or food reformers are the only consistent worshippers and the flesh-eater is convicted of inconsistency and falsehood". Mitchell stated that meat-eaters who decorated churches for the harvest festival were making the festival a service of lies and questioned why they didn't also use "trophies of the butcher's art". In 1910, he published the pamphlet "The Church and Food Reform". He condemned such festivals as "uric-acid festivals" for meat-eaters.

Mitchell was a vice-president of the Vegetarian Society, from 1922, and a speaker at its meetings. He was a council member of Josiah Oldfield's fruitarian Lady Margaret Hospital in Bromley. He was also a council member of the Order of the Golden Age and wrote for its journal, The Herald of the Golden Age.

=== Personal life and death ===
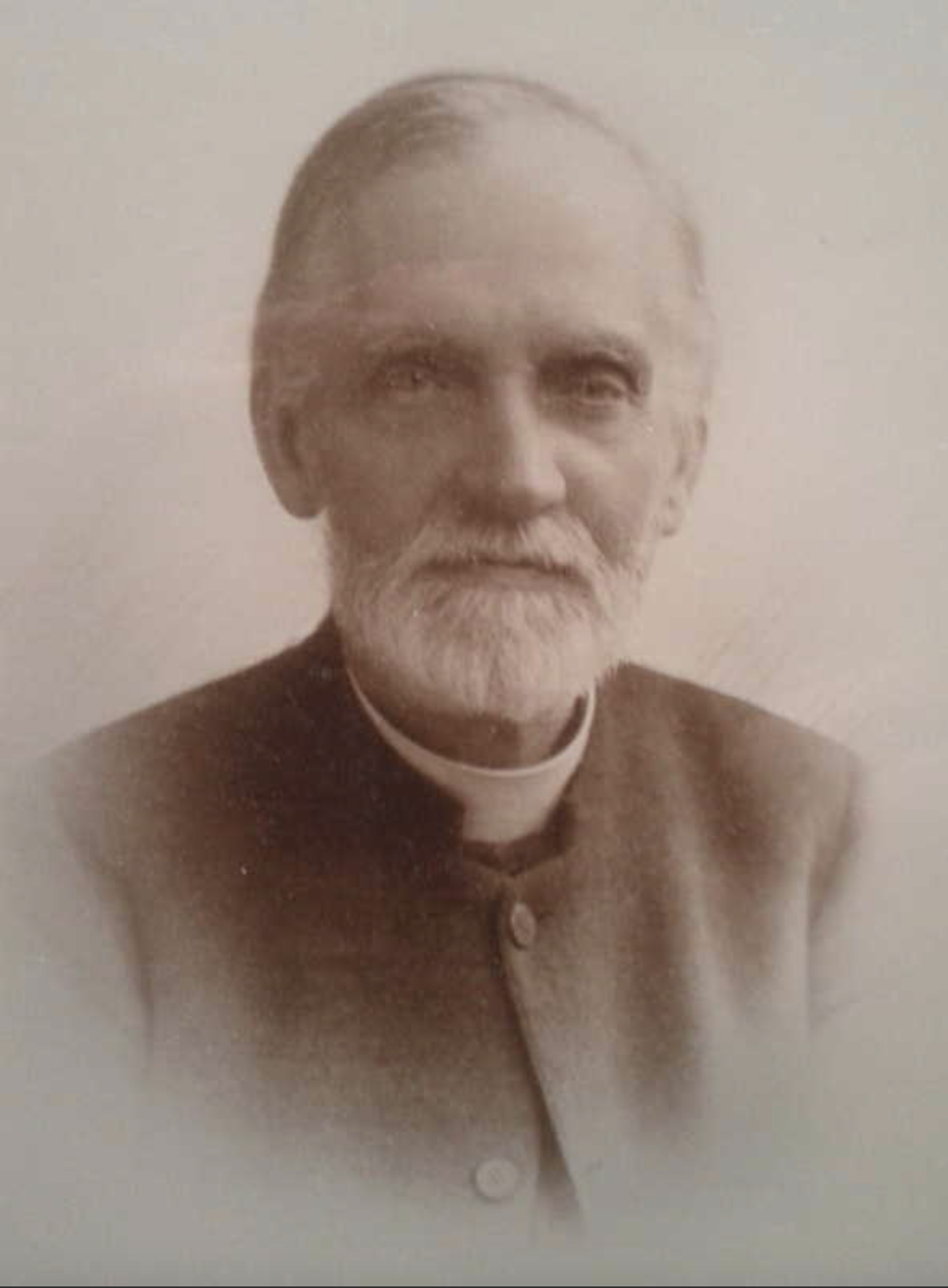
Mitchell in his later years

On 8 September 1887, Mitchell married Janet Elizabeth Louisa, the daughter of the solicitor William Hammond of London, at Stratford-sub-Castle, Salisbury.

Mitchell died in Burtonwood on 18 February 1936, aged 83. He was buried at Burtonwood Cemetery.

== Selected publications ==
- "I claim greater Health, Fitness, and Happiness" (PDF). The Herald of the Golden Age. 5 (12): 185–186. 1900.
- Humane Education: A Plea for a Humane and Ethical System of Elementary Education. 1906.
- "The Christmas Altar" (PDF). The Herald of the Golden Age. 40 (5): 88–89. 1907.
- "Christmas Cruelties". Burton Wood Parish Magazine. December 1909.
- "What Shall We Eat?". Burton Wood Parish Magazine. 23 September 2019.
- "The Church and Food Reform". The Herald of the Golden Age. April 1910.
