= Arthur Harvie =

English minister and activist (1869–1905)

The Reverend Arthur Harvie
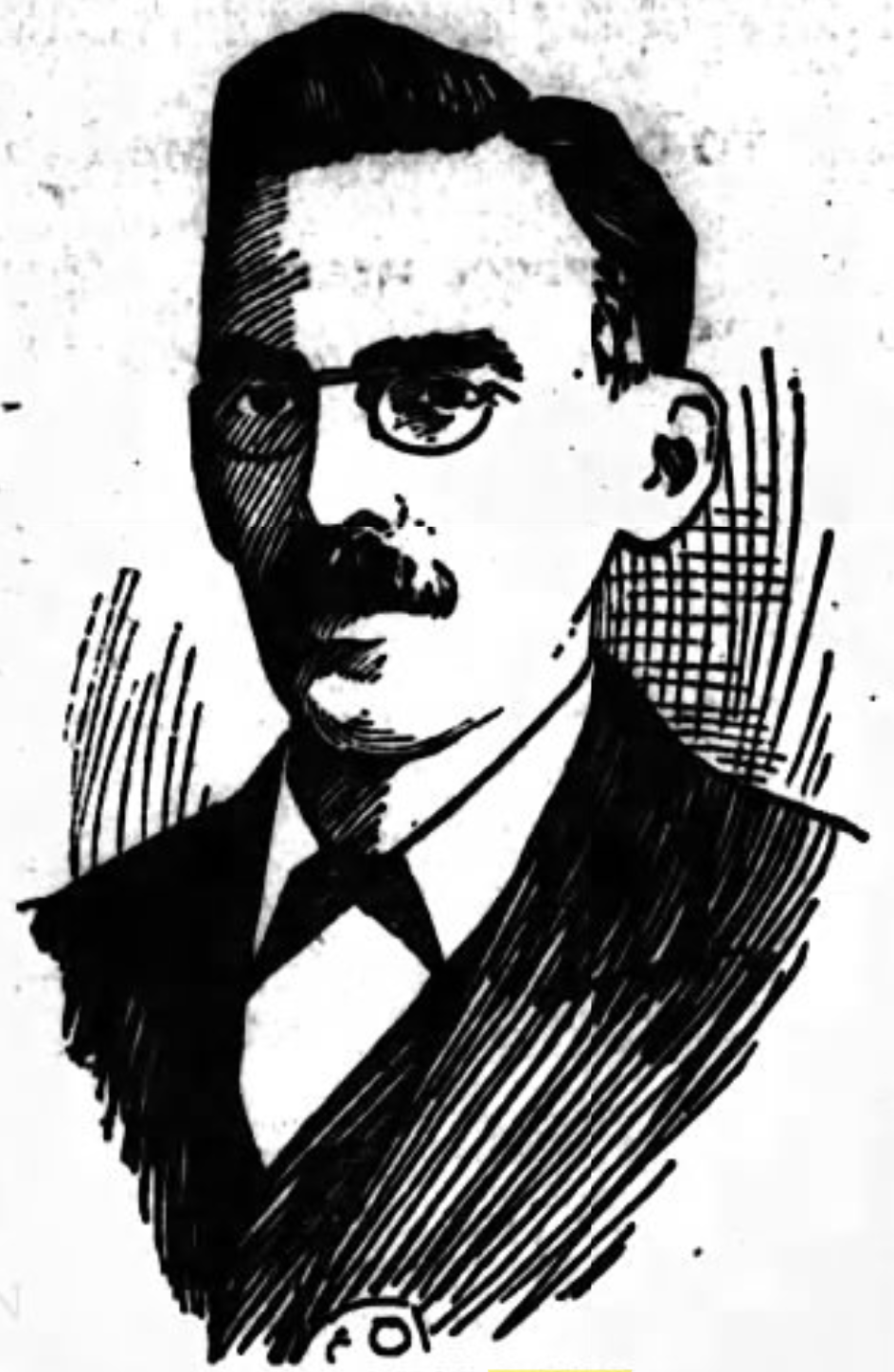
- Born: Arthur Edgar Harvie; 1869
- Died: 28 March 1905 (aged 36); Northampton, England
- Occupations: Unitarian minister, activist
- Spouse: Katherine Maud (m. 1894)

Arthur Edgar Harvie (1869 – 28 March 1905) was an English Unitarian minister and activist for anti-vivisection and vegetarianism.

== Biography ==
=== Career ===
Arthur Edgar Harvie was a watchmaker by trade and decided to devote his life to the ministry of the Unitarian Church. He became minister of Christ Unitarian Church, Devonport in 1892 and was instrumental in getting the church renovated. Harvie was minister at the Unitarian Church, Choppington from 1897 to 1901. He was minister in Gateshead where he succeeded in getting an iron church built.

In 1903, Harvie moved to Northampton and was minister of Kettering Road Free Church. Harvie and his wife Katherine founded the Friendly Help Society in Northampton. Harvie was fond of Northampton and commented that "if this town is not the City of God, then there is no town which answers to the description. If we cannot say of this place, God is in the midst of her, then the earth has become a tomb and we are mouldering to decay".

=== Activism ===
==== Anti-vivisectionism ====
Harvie was an anti-vivisectionist and member of the British Union for the Abolition of Vivisection. In 1899, he was a speaker at a meeting of the Union for Abolition of Vivisection at Sheffield Temperance Hall. His address was on the "immoral and unscientific method" of vivisection. He argued that no human had the right to torture any living animal, or to give it such intense pain that its life was not worth living. He was a member of the Humanitarian League and joined its executive committee in 1900.

==== Vegetarianism ====
He campaigned for Christian vegetarianism. In 1899, Harvie argued for an ethical spiritual basis of vegetarianism commenting that Christian vegetarians hold a "deep religious conviction that life is sacred, that murder is horrible, that torture, such as millions of animals have daily to suffer in order that flesh-eaters may be satisfied is devilish". He predicted that in the future there would be a "great church of vegetarians. It will grow until that day arrives when Christians will be consistent, and flesh eating will be unknown". In 1901, he was a speaker at the 54th anniversary of the Vegetarian Society in Manchester with George Black, Albert Broadbent, Percy Lund, Eustace Miles, J. C. Street and others. Harvie was a council member of the Order of the Golden Age.

=== Personal life and death ===
Harvie married Katherine Maud in 1894.

Harvie suffered from a weak heart. As a young man his doctor forbade him to study for the ministry but Harvie persevered. He died of heart failure in 1905, at the age of 36. His funeral was held at Kettering Road Free Church and his remains were sent to Leicester Crematorium.

The last letter that Harvie penned before his death was a letter on Boy's Brigades and military drill which was published in the Manchester Guardian.

== Selected publications ==
- Pigeon Shooting. Humanitarian League. OCLC 50161754.
- Harvie, Arthur; Coulson, W. L. B.; Joseph, Stratton (1911). British Blood Sports. London: A. C. Fifield.
