= Robert Semple =

Robert Semple may refer to:

- Robert Sample (died 1719), or Semple, pirate who left Edward England to sail the Caribbean
- Robert Semple (activist) (1841–1920), Scottish poet and temperance activist
- Robert Semple (fur trader) (1777–1816), governor of the Red River Colony in Canada
- Robert Semple (Medal of Honor) (1887–1943), Medal of Honor recipient
- Robert B. Semple (1806–1854), California newspaperman and politician, who helped found Benicia, California
- Robert B. Semple Jr. (born 1936), 1996 Pulitzer Prize winning journalist and editor
- Bob Semple (1873–1955), New Zealand politician
- Robert James Semple, Irish missionary, first husband of Aimee Semple McPherson
