= George Black (physician) =

Scottish physician (1854–1913)

- Born: 1854; Edinburgh, Scotland
- Died: 5 May 1913 (aged 59); Torquay, England
- Occupations: Physician; medical writer; vegetarian activist; hotelier
- Organizations: British Homoeopathic Society; Vegetarian Society; Order of the Golden Age

George Black (1854 – 5 May 1913) was a Scottish physician, medical writer, vegetarian activist, and hotelier. He operated Dartmoor House, a vegetarian hotel in Belstone, and wrote works on medicine, cookery and food reform.

== Biography ==
=== Early life and medical career ===
Black was born in Edinburgh, where he obtained his M.B. He was Medical Officer of Health to the Keswick Urban Council. He later worked as a medical doctor at Greta Bank on Greenway Road in Chelston, Torquay.

Black was a member of the British Homoeopathic Society and contributed articles to homeopathic journals. He wrote popular medical books, several of which went through multiple editions. He edited Household Medicine, which has been cited for its advice on the number of hours of sleep needed according to age and physical health.

In 1899, Black published Viscum Album: The Common Mistletoe, a work on the natural history of mistletoe and its use in the treatment of disease.

=== Vegetarianism and Dartmoor House ===
Black became a vegetarian in 1896 for humanitarian reasons. He was an anti-vivisectionist and vice-president of the Devon branch of the Vegetarian Society. He was also a supporter of the Order of the Golden Age.

In 1899, Black purchased Dartmoor House in Belstone and converted it into a vegetarian hotel for his patients. The Vegetarian Society's annual picnic was held in the grounds of the house. Isabel Densham worked as the hotel's vegetarian cook. Black's A Manual of Vegetarian Cookery, published in 1908, included Densham's recipes.

Black spoke at the Vegetarian Society's May conference in Bristol in 1909.

=== Food research ===
Black advocated whole foods and argued that white flour was harmful because the bran and wheat germ were removed. He was a friend of James Henry Cook and worked as a scientific researcher for the Pitman Health Food Company. According to the International Vegetarian Union, Nuto Cream Soup and Nut Cream were invented under his direction; the products contained no cow's milk and required only the addition of water. The Pitman Health Food Company also sold Vegsal, a medicinal salt obtained from vegetables through Black's research.

=== Death ===
Black died at Greta Bank, Torquay, on 5 May 1913, aged 59.

== Publications ==
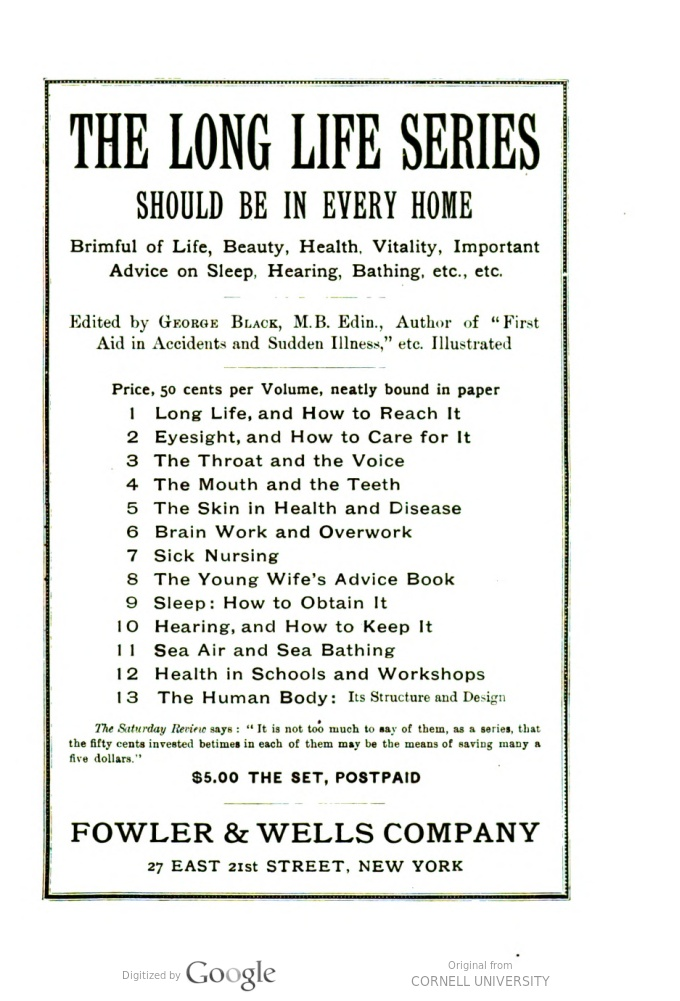
Black was editor of The Long Life Series

- Household Medicine (1881)
- First Aid (1887)
- Sick-Nursing (1888)
- Some Physical Aspects of the Temperance Question (1890)
- Every-Day Ailments and Accidents, and Their Treatment at Home (1892)
- Viscum Album: The Common Mistletoe (1899)
- A Manual of Vegetarian Cookery (1908)
- The Doctor at Home and Nurse's Guide-Book (1909)
- The Doctor and Nurse's Guide (1910)
- The Olive: Its Medicinal and Curative Virtues (1910)

=== The Long Life Series ===
- Long Life and How to Reach It (1888)
- Sleep and How to Obtain It (1888)
- The Mouth and the Teeth (1888)
- The Skin in Health and Disease (1888)
- The Throat and the Voice (1888)
- The Young Wife's Advice Book (1888)
