= Henry John Williams =

English priest and activist (1841–1919)

The Reverend Henry John Williams
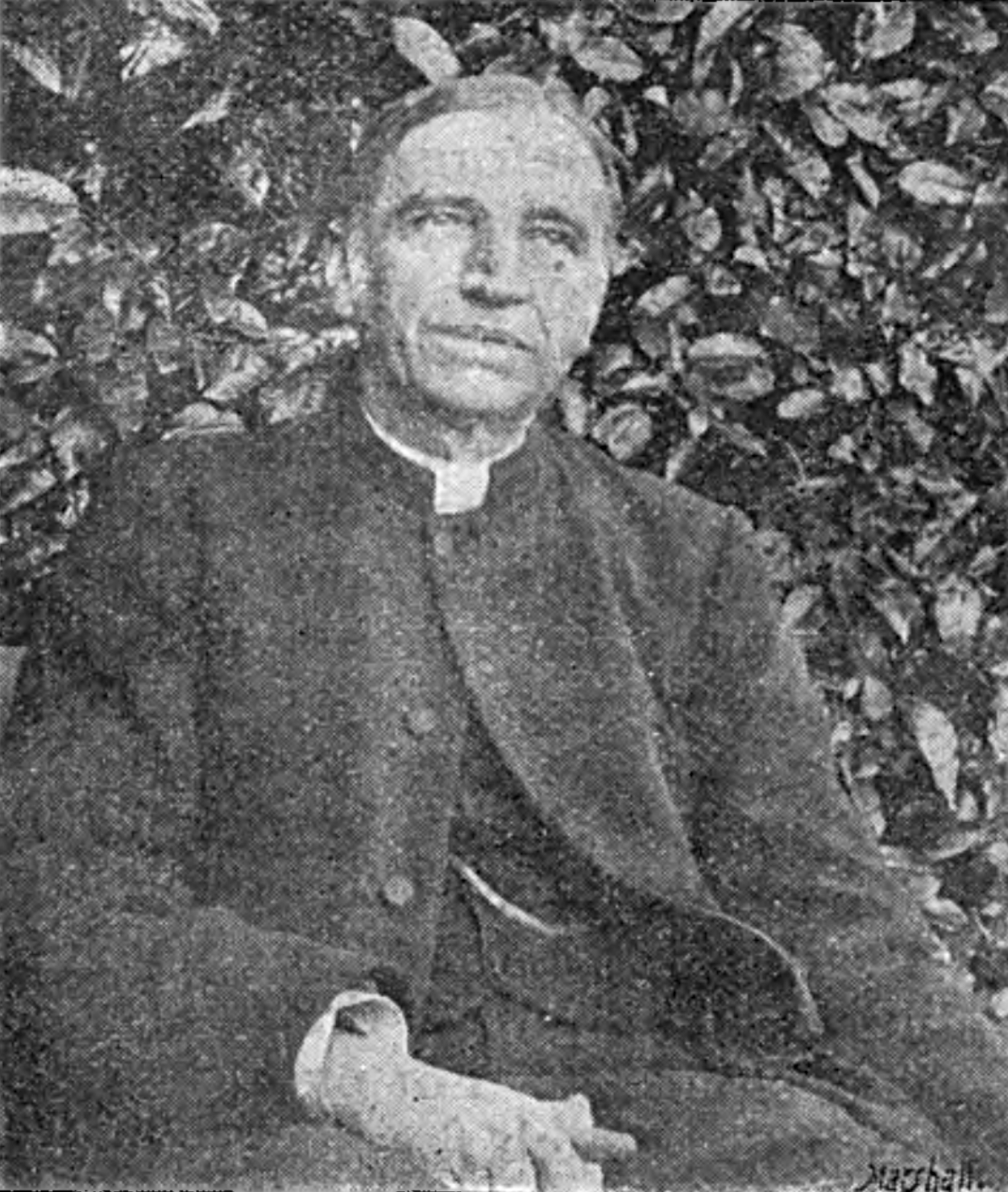
- Williams, c. 1894
- Born: 8 February 1841; Whatley, Mendip, England
- Died: 1 April 1919 (aged 78); Aspley Guise, England
- Education: The Queen's College, Oxford; University College, Durham
- Occupations: Priest; writer; activist
- Known for: Advocacy for Christian vegetarianism; Founding the Order of the Golden Age
- Spouse: Cecelia Frances D'Arblay Croft (m. 1871; div. 1892)
- Relatives: Howard Williams (brother)

Ecclesiastical career
- Religion: Anglicanism
- Church: Church of England
- Ordained: Deacon (1863); Priest (1864)
- Offices held: Rector of Tintern (1871–1873); Rector of Brympton (1880–1883); Rector of Kinross (from 1889)

Henry John Williams (8 February 1841 – 1 April 1919) was an English Anglican priest, writer and advocate of Christian vegetarianism. A younger brother of the humanitarian writer Howard Williams, he became a vegetarian and founded the Order of the Golden Age in 1881. He participated in the order's revival in 1895 alongside Sidney H. Beard and others, and contributed articles to its journal, The Herald of the Golden Age. He was also honorary president of the Scottish Vegetarian Society and a member of the Humanitarian League's Humane Diet department.

== Early life and education ==
Henry John Williams was born on 8 February 1841 in Whatley, Mendip, Somerset. His parents were the Reverend Hamilton John Williams, an Anglican clergyman, and Margaret Sophia Williams (née Taunton). He was one of seven sons, including Howard Williams, who wrote The Ethics of Diet.

Williams matriculated at The Queen's College, Oxford, in 1860. He later obtained a L.Th. from University College, Durham.

== Ecclesiastical career ==
Williams was ordained deacon in 1863 and priest in 1864 by John Jackson, Bishop of Lincoln. He was rector of Tintern from 1871 to 1873 and of Brympton d'Evercy from 1880 to 1883. In 1889, he became rector of St Paul's, Kinross.

== Christian vegetarianism ==
According to his brother Howard, Williams adopted a vegetarian diet in 1878 after being influenced by him. He wrote A Plea for a Broken Law, a pamphlet advocating vegetarianism on Christian grounds.

In 1881, Williams founded the Order of the Golden Age, a Christian vegetarian organisation formally established in 1882. The order ceased operating soon afterwards because of financial difficulties. Williams was involved in its revival in 1895 with Sidney H. Beard and others. He contributed articles to the order's journal, The Herald of the Golden Age, including "Dark Ages, Past & Present" (1897) and "A Call to the Christian Church" (1900).

Williams was honorary president of the Scottish Vegetarian Society and a member of the Humane Diet department of the Humanitarian League, which his brother Howard had helped to establish.

== Personal life and death ==
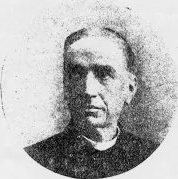
Williams, from an obituary

Williams married Cecelia Frances D'Arblay Croft on 31 August 1871 at Wavendon, Buckinghamshire. In July 1892, the Court of Session heard an undefended divorce action brought by Williams against his wife, who was then living in Canada. According to the newspaper report, they had no children and had lived together for ten years before separating in 1881, although they briefly reunited in 1887. The court granted the divorce.

Williams died on 1 April 1919 in Aspley Guise, aged 78. His brother Howard wrote an obituary published in the May 1919 issue of The Vegetarian Messenger and Health Review. (Note: Howard's obituary gives Williams's year of birth as 1838 and his age at death as 81. However, his birth record gives 1841 as the year of birth and his death record gives his age at death as 78.)

== Publications ==
- A Plea for a Broken Law.
- "A Plea for the Order of the Golden Age". The Herald of the Golden Age. 1 (1).
- The Relation of Christians to the Animal World. 1896.
- "Dark Ages, Past & Present". The Herald of the Golden Age. January 1897.
- "A Call to the Christian Church" (PDF). The Herald of the Golden Age. 5 (12): 143–144. 15 December 1900.

== See also ==
- Christian vegetarianism
- Christianity and animal rights
- History of vegetarianism
- Vegetarianism in the United Kingdom
- Vegetarianism in the Victorian era
