= J. Isaac Pengelly =

English clerk and activist (1853–1937)

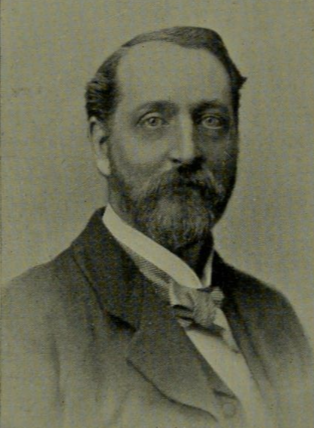
- Portrait from Fifty Years of Food Reform (1898)
- Born: John Isaac Pengelly; 1853
- Died: 6 May 1937 (aged 84); Exeter, England
- Resting place: St. James' Church, Exeter
- Occupations: Clerk, activist
- Spouse: Lavinia Pengelly

John Isaac Pengelly (1853 – 6 May 1937) was an English clerk and activist for animal rights and vegetarianism. He was a clerk to Exeter Magistrates for 48 years and the founder of Exeter Vegetarian Society.

== Career ==
Pengelly was educated at St. John's Hospital School in Exeter. After leaving school, he began working as a clerk for H. D. Barton of the Exeter Magistrates. In 1887, he succeeded Barton as clerk to the Justices. Over the course of his career, he collaborated with 117 justices in matters related to the police court. From 1912 to 1932, he served as the clerk of the Exeter Insurance Committee. Additionally, he was a member of the Western Provident Association, where he also held the role of solicitor.

Pengelly retired from clerkship after 48 years in 1935. He was a director and vice-chairman of Exeter City Football Club.

== Activism ==
Pengelly was introduced to vegetarianism through reading a letter by R. Bailey Walker in the Exeter papers in Autumn 1880. He became a vegetarian in 1881 for ethical reasons. Pengelly acknowledged the health and hygienic benefits of a vegetarian diet, but stated that he gave up eating meat due to the unnecessary cruelty of animal slaughter.

Pengelly was founder and secretary of the Exeter Vegetarian Society. He was elected president in 1891 and was president of the Devon and Exeter Vegetarian Society in 1894. His wife Lavinia was initially hostile to vegetarianism but later converted and lectured on vegetarian meals. She died in 1913.

In 1894, he authored a pamphlet, Animal Rights, which dealt "exhaustively with the whole matter of man's duty in regard to the treatment of animals". Pengelly attended the annual meeting of the Vegetarian Federal Union in 1896. He served on the General Council of the Order of the Golden Age and was its Registrar in 1896.

In 1898, Pengelly argued that all references to meat eating in school books should be eliminated and that the young should not be imbued with the idea of bloodshed in preparation of food. Pengelly was known to have worn vegetarian boots.

== Death ==
Pengelly died from bronchitis on 6 May 1937, in Exeter at the age of 84. His funeral took place at St. James' Church, Exeter.

== Selected publications ==
- Animal Rights (1894)
