= Harold W. Whiston =

English businessman and magistrate

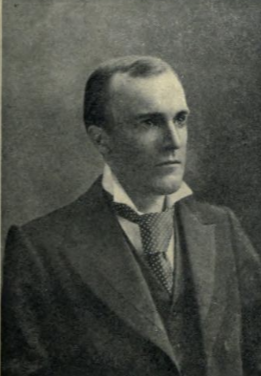
- Born: Harold Walter Whiston; 1873; Macclesfield
- Died: 12 January 1952 (aged 78); Macclesfield
- Occupation: Magistrate
- Spouse: Alice Proctor (m. 1896)

Harold Walter Whiston (1873 – 12 January 1952) was an English businessman, magistrate and activist for anti-vaccination and vegetarianism.

== Career ==
Whiston was educated at Tettenhall College and Owen's College in Staffordshire. As a young man he worked with his father Alderman William Whiston who owned and managed Langley Silk Printing Works. In 1901, he became a partner of the business and was the sole owner after his father died in 1915. He registered the business as a limited company under the title of William Whiston & Sons Ltd and became governing director. In 1929, the company was amalgamated under the title of Brocklehurst Whiston Amalgamated. He became director of the combined company until his retirement in 1951.

Whiston was the senior Magistrate in Macclesfield, having been appointed as Justice of Peace in 1914. He was appointed chairman of Macclesfield County Magistrates in 1941. He was also chairman of the Licensing Justices and of the Juvenile Court. He resigned as chairman in 1949 from injuries sustained from an accident falling down steps inside Macclesfield Town Hall, but continued to sit on the bench as a magistrate.

He was chairman of the Liberal Party Macclesfield Division, a position he held from 1906. He was active in the temperance movement as president of the Band of Hope Union. He resigned in 1911 to focus on political issues. He became president of the Liberal Party Macclesfield Division and was invited to become a candidate but was unable to accept because of business demands.

== Personal life ==
Whiston married Alice Proctor in 1896. They celebrated their silver wedding in 1921. He was a wealthy landowner. In 1925, he invited 50 members of the Stockport Horticultural Society to his gardens at the Elms, Macclesfield.

He was a vegetarian, non-smoker, teetotaller and anti-vaccinator. He served on the General Council of the Order of the Golden Age and was appointed its first provincial counsellor. In 1908, he was a speaker at the Vegetarian Society's May conference at Queen's Hall with Albert Broadbent, Walter Hadwen, William Harrison and James C. Street.

Whiston was a Methodist and was known as a preacher at Langley Chapel. He was a member of the National Anti-Vaccination League. He authored an anti-vaccination book in 1906 titled Why Vaccinate. Mahatma Gandhi was known to have quoted from the book to denounce vaccination as unnecessary.

Whiston died in 1952, aged 78. Tributes were paid to him at Macclesfield County Magistrates' Court, including an act of silence as a mark of respect. An obituary described him as "one of the most forceful and dynamic personalities Macclesfield has ever produced".

== Selected publications ==
- Humanity’s Great Enemy (1898)
- "The Great Cry". The Vegetarian Magazine. 6 (7): 152–153. 1902.
- Why Vaccinate (1906)
