= Frances L. Boult =

English social reformer (1856–1905)

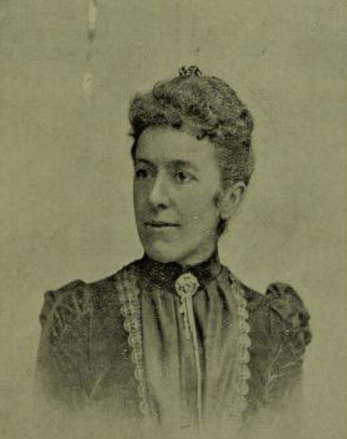
- Boult in Fifty Years of Food Reform (1898)
- Born: Frances Sarah Louisa Morton; 28 April 1856; The Wirral, England
- Died: 29 April 1905 (aged 49); Malvern, England
- Occupations: Social reformer; magazine editor; cookery instructor
- Spouse: Alfred Julius Boult (m. 1880)
- Children: 3

Frances Sarah Louisa Boult (née Morton; 28 April 1856 – 29 April 1905) was an English social reformer, magazine editor, and cookery instructor. She was active in the temperance and vegetarian movements, founded the Ivy Leaf Society and edited its magazine The Children's Garden. She also founded and was vice-president of the Northern Heights Vegetarian Society.

== Biography ==
=== Career ===
Boult was born Frances Sarah Louisa Morton in The Wirral on 28 April 1856. As a young woman, she was involved in the women's temperance movement. According to James Gregory, she became a vegetarian to treat paralysis before adopting vegetarianism on ethical grounds.

==== Ivy Leaf Society ====
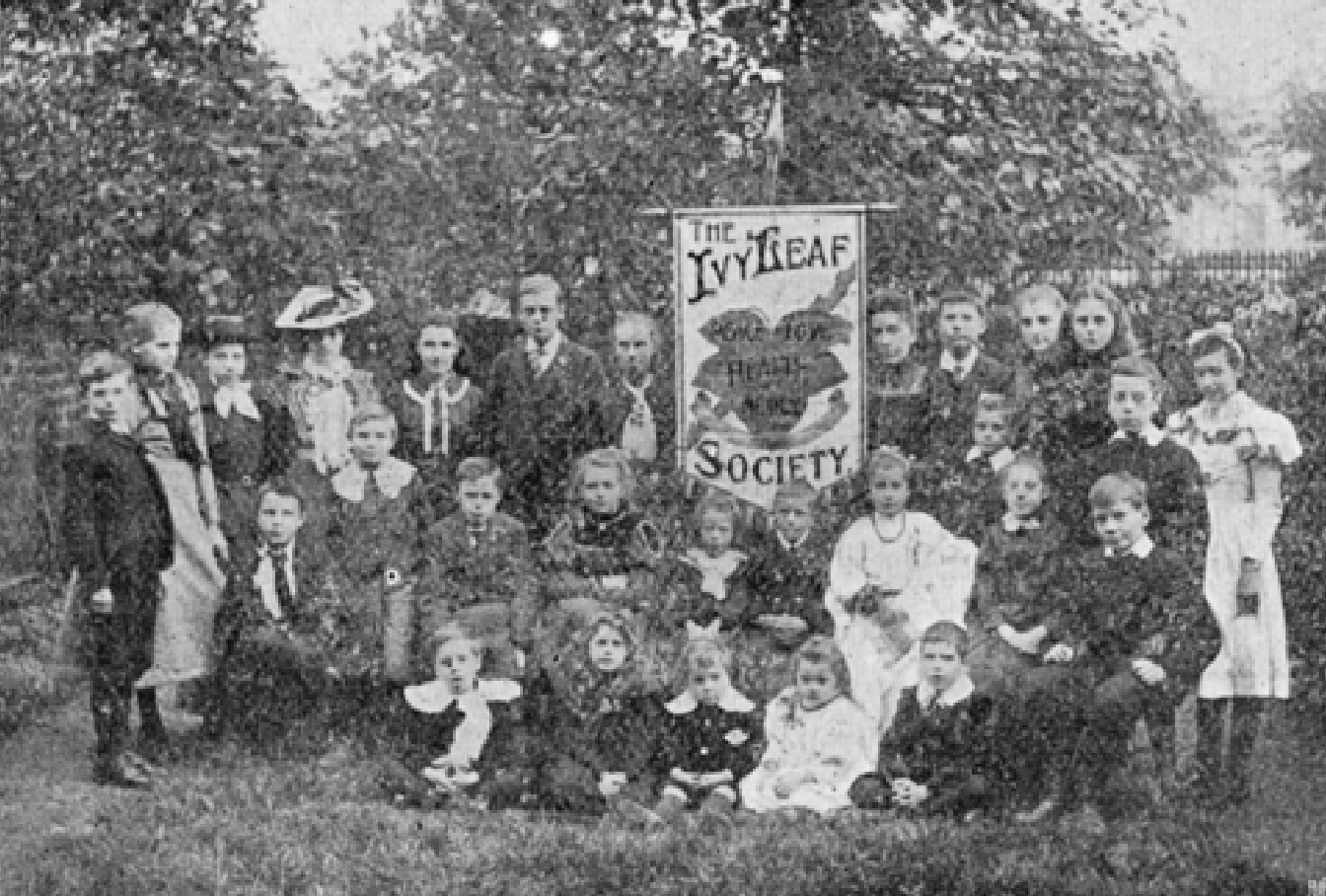
Camden Town branch of the Ivy Leaf Society, 1899

Boult founded the Ivy Leaf Society, a vegetarian organisation for young people under the age of 17. She was its honorary secretary and later its president. Its motto was: "I will not kill nor hurt any living creature needlessly, nor destroy any beautiful thing, but will strive to comfort and protect all gentle life upon the earth". Children from the Society met at Boult's house at Hilldrop Crescent, Camden Road, where they delivered songs and played games.

The Society lectured at schools and offered prizes to children for vegetarian essays. Boult spoke at the Vegetarian Federal Union's 4th International Congress in 1897. She was also active in the London Vegetarian Society, which cooperated with the Ivy Leaf Society. In 1900, the Ivy Leaf Society began publishing The Children's Garden, a magazine edited by Boult. After its first year, 32,000 copies had circulated. It appeared monthly until December 1905 and printed fiction, poetry, and non-fiction articles on moral instruction and vegetarianism.

==== Northern Heights Vegetarian Society ====
Boult founded the Northern Heights Vegetarian Society and was one of its vice-presidents. In 1904, she lectured on "Substitutes: How the vegetable kingdom replaces the animal" and demonstrated alternatives to animal products. These included nut fats as substitutes for lard and suet, vegetable substitutes for candles and soaps, boots made without leather, and imitation furs.

==== Other work ====
Boult founded the children's section of the Vegetarian Society and was on the General Council of the Order of the Golden Age. She also published the children's magazine Rainbow. She also contributed vegetarian cookery material, including a plum pudding recipe.

=== Personal life and death ===
Boult married Alfred Julius Boult on 24 August 1880. He was the founder of Boult Wade Tennant. They had two sons and one daughter. Their daughter Winifred worked on The Children's Garden in 1900.

Boult died of meningitis at Swinmore House, Malvern, on 29 April 1905. A memorial service was held at the Rosslyn Hill Unitarian Chapel on 3 May. Sidney H. Beard wrote that humanity had lost "one of its bravest and most devoted apostles".

== Legacy ==
After Boult's death, the Ivy Leaf Society and The Children's Garden ended in December 1905. The Vegetarian Federal Union published a new magazine, The Children's Realm, from January 1906 as a continuation of Boult's work. The magazine was managed by Arnold Hills.

== Publications ==
- "A Mother's Appeal for Women" (PDF). Herald of the Golden Age. 5 (12): 146–147. 15 December 1900.
- "Christmas, the Festival of Slaughter". Herald of the Golden Age. December 1898. (also published as a pamphlet)

== See also ==
- History of vegetarianism
- Vegetarianism in the United Kingdom
- Vegetarianism in the Victorian era
- Women and vegetarianism and veganism advocacy
- Temperance movement in the United Kingdom
