= Richard Dalziel Graham =

British educator, author, artist and printer

Richard Dalziel Graham FRSE (died 1920) was a British educator, author, artist and printer. He was Director of the Calico Printers Association in Edinburgh.

== Life ==
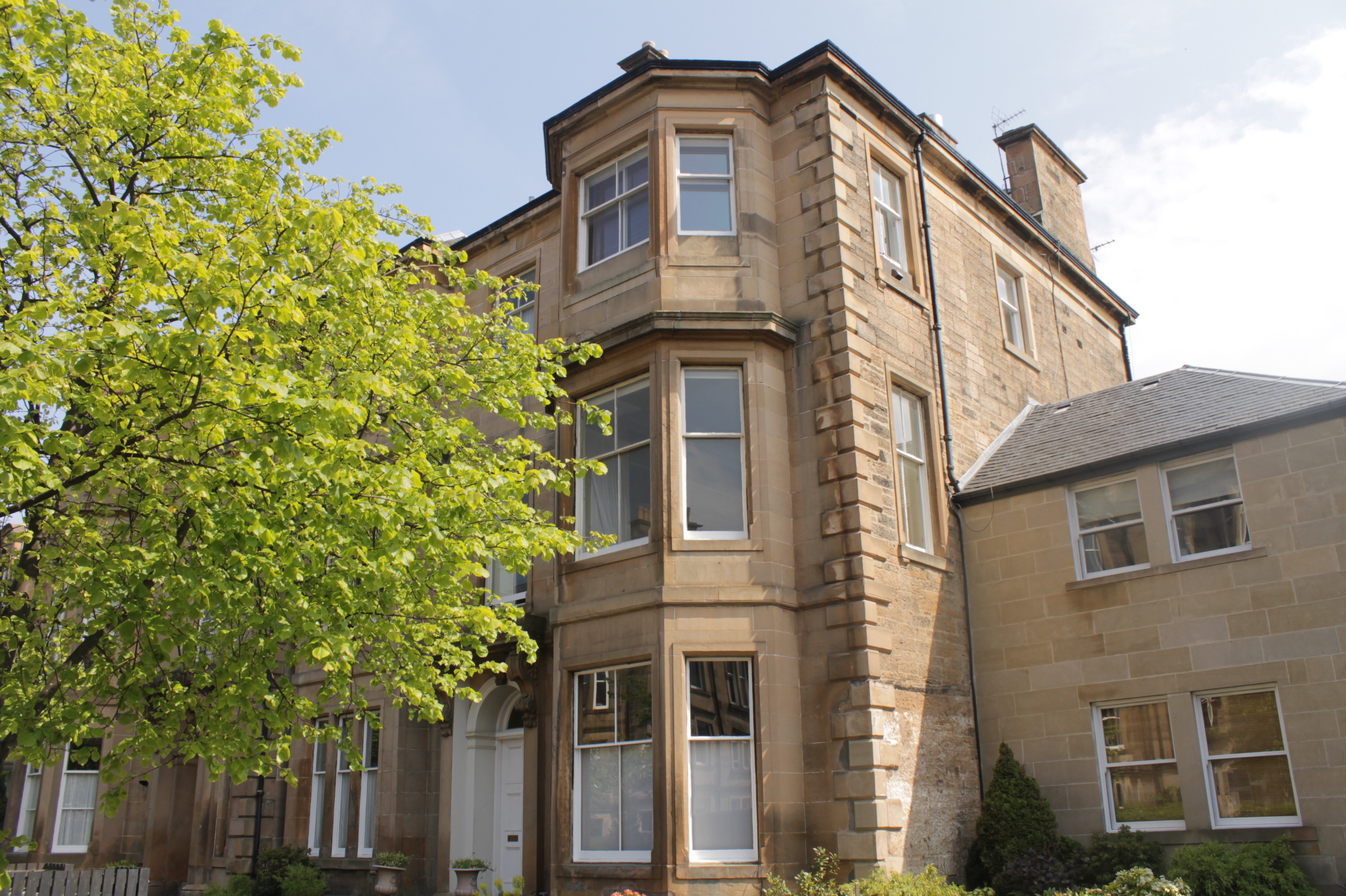
10,11,12 Strathearn Road, Edinburgh

Little is known of his early life other than that he was educated at Manchester Grammar School and then Tettenhall College.

He appears in Edinburgh around 1867 as a teacher of English at 6 Marmion Terrace. He then moves to 18 Lonsdale Terrace around 1870. From 1880 onwards he is running the Strathearn College for Young Ladies at 10 to 12 Strathearn Road in Edinburgh, and is believed to have founded this establishment. This establishment appears to have been specially aimed at the daughters of Scottish clergymen.

He was elected a Fellow of the Royal Society of Edinburgh in 1891. His proposers were Rev Henry Calderwood, Robert McNair Ferguson, Andrew Wilson and Charles Teape.

In later life he appears to have still lived in the college on Strathearn Road but is no longer listed as its director.

He died on 12 September 1920 and is presumed buried in the Grange Cemetery close to his home.

He had a daughter Edith.

== Publications ==
- The Masters of Victorian Literature (1897)
