= George Jones (British journalist) =

Journalist

George Jones is a British journalist who is the former political editor of The Telegraph and a member of the Leveson Inquiry.

Jones' father was Clem Jones, who was editor of the Express & Star in Wolverhampton for a decade from 1960. His brother is Nicholas Jones, a former political and industrial correspondent for BBC News.
