= Edmund J. Baillie =

Welsh businessman and horticulturist (1851–1897)

Edmund J. Baillie FRHS FLS
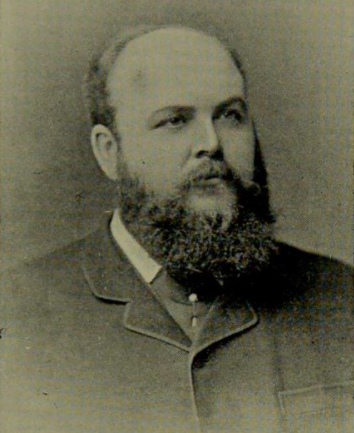
- Portrait from Fifty Years of Food Reform (1898)
- Born: Edmund John Baillie; 4 May 1851; Hawarden, Wales
- Died: 18 October 1897 (aged 46); Chester, England
- Occupations: Businessman; horticulturist; vegetarian activist
- Awards: Kingsley Memorial Medal

Signature
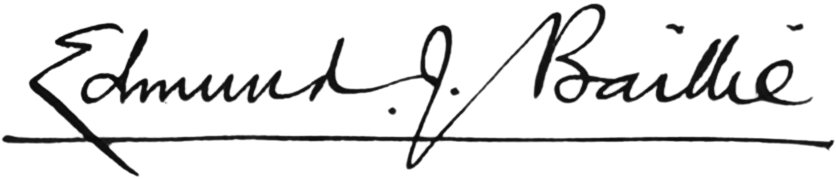

Edmund John Baillie FRHS FLS (4 May 1851 – 18 October 1897) was a Welsh businessman, horticulturist and vegetarian activist.

== Biography ==
Baillie was born in Hawarden, Wales, on 4 May 1851. As a young man, he worked at the firm F. and A. Dickson and Sons of Eastgate, Chester, where he later became its adviser and partner. After Dickson's two firms were amalgamated, he became deputy chairman of Dicksons, Limited.

Baillie was a friend of John Ruskin and president of the John Ruskin Society in Liverpool. He was honorary secretary and treasurer of the Grosvenor Museum at Chester and a member of the Chester Society of Natural Science. He was a member of the Royal Horticultural Society and was later elected a fellow. He was elected to the Linnean Society of London on 21 June 1878 and became a fellow in 1883. Baillie specialised in fruit trees. He also corresponded with Walt Whitman.

Baillie contributed to Gardener's Magazine, Journal of Botany, Journal of Horticulture, Cottage Gardener and the Proceedings of the Linnean Society. For his services to natural science, he was awarded the Kingsley Memorial Medal. Baillie was a Presbyterian and was church secretary at the English Presbyterian Church of Wales, Chester for many years. He was a spiritualist and a member of the London Spiritualist Alliance.

Baillie died on 18 October 1897 in Chester.

== Vegetarianism ==
Baillie was a vegetarian. He joined the Vegetarian Society in 1878 and later served as a vice-president. He wrote papers in defence of vegetarianism, including papers read at conferences such as the International Vegetarian Congress. In 1885, Baillie wrote in The Dietetic Reformer about vegetarian rennet made from the berries of Withania coagulans. He served on the General Council of the Order of the Golden Age in 1897.

== Publications ==
- John Ruskin: Aspects of His Thought and Teachings (1882)
- The Cats' Cradle: A Story for Children (1893)
- The Importance of British Fruit Growing From a Food Point of View (1896)
