= Nicholas Jones (journalist) =

British journalist (born 1942)

- Born: 1 October 1942 (age 83); Abergavenny, Monmouthshire, Wales, UK
- Education: Tettenhall College, Staffordshire (independent boarding school) (now in Wolverhampton).
- Occupations: Journalist, author, commentator
- Employer: BBC (1972–2002)
- Known for: Fmr. BBC Industrial Correspondent; Fmr. BBC Senior Political Correspondent; Author and features writer

Nicholas Jones (born 1942) is a British broadcasting and newspaper journalist, author and political commentator.

Jones is a print and broadcasting journalist and former BBC industrial and senior political correspondent with over fifty years' experience. He is also the author of several books about British politics and industrial relations.

== Early life ==
Jones was born on 1 October 1942 in the market town of Abergavenny, Monmouthshire. His father was Clem Jones, who edited the Express & Star in Wolverhampton for a decade from 1960, and his brother is George Jones, the former political editor of The Daily Telegraph.

== Education ==
Jones was educated at Tettenhall College, a boarding independent school for boys (now co-educational) in the suburban town of Tettenhall in Staffordshire (since 1966 part of Wolverhampton).

== Life and career ==
In the late 1950s, Jones left school at the age of 16, to work as an editorial assistant on the weekly trade magazine Advertisers Weekly. For seven years he worked as a reporter on evening newspapers in Portsmouth and Oxford.

In 1968, Jones joined The Times newspaper as a parliamentary reporter. In 1972, he joined BBC Radio Leicester as a news producer, and within 18 months became a reporter for BBC Radio News in London. He became an acting BBC political correspondent at Westminster for the 1975 Broadcasting from Parliament experiment.

In 1979, Jones became BBC Labour and Trade Union Affairs Correspondent, and in 1980 BBC Labour Correspondent, followed by BBC Political Correspondent, based at Westminster. Jones left the BBC in 2002, and has continued to write and speak about political matters at conferences and in the media. He is on the national council of the Campaign for Press and Broadcasting Freedom and a trustee of the Journalists' Charity.

== Publications ==
- Strikes and the Media: Communication and Conflict (Basil Blackwell, 1986)
- Election '92 (BBC Books, 1992)
- Soundbites and Spin Doctors: How Politicians Manipulate the Media – And Vice Versa (Cassell, 1995)
- Campaign 1997 (Indigo, 1997)
- Sultans of Spin: The Media and the New Labour Government (Victor Gollancz, 1999)
- The Control Freaks: How New Labour Gets its Own Way (Politico, 2001)
- Campaign 2001 (Politico, 2001)
- Trading Information: Leaks, Lies and Tip-offs (Politico, 2006)
- Campaign 2010: The Making of the Prime Minister (Bite Back, 2010)
- The Lost Tribe: Whatever Happened to Fleet Street's Industrial Correspondents? (Nicholas Jones, 2011)
