= R. Bailey Walker =

English clergyman, activist, editor, and writer (1839–1885)

The Reverend R. Bailey Walker FSS
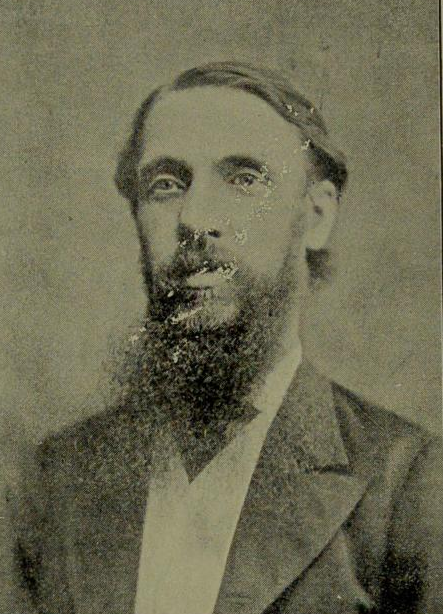
- Portrait from Fifty Years of Food Reform (1898)
- Born: Robert Bailey Walker; 7 October 1839; Bamber Bridge, England
- Died: 28 May 1885 (aged 46); St Leonards-on-Sea, England
- Resting place: Hastings Cemetery
- Occupations: Clergyman; activist; editor; writer
- Spouse: Matilda Margaret "Dora" Walker
- Children: 3

Robert Bailey Walker FSS (7 October 1839 – 28 May 1885) was an English clergyman, activist, editor, and writer. He served as honorary curate at St Clement's Church in Longsight and was actively involved in promoting temperance and vegetarianism. Walker served as secretary of the Vegetarian Society, edited several publications, and authored a number of pamphlets.

== Biography ==
=== Early life ===
Walker was born at Bamber Bridge on 7 October 1839, the son of Robert Walker and Hannah Abode. He was baptised on 27 October. Walker's family worked in the cotton industry.

=== Career ===
Walker started his career as a schoolmaster. He later served as secretary of the Free and Open Church Movement in Manchester and worked as editor of the Industrial Partnerships Record. Additionally, Walker became the first editor of Co-operative News. He presented papers to the British Association, Social Science Congress and Manchester Statistical Society. Walker was also a Fellow of the Royal Statistical Society.

Walker was a founder of the Ruskin Society. A committed teetotaller, he took the pledge from Joseph Livesey. Walker also served as secretary of the Manchester and Salford Temperance Union and corresponded extensively social reform advocates worldwide.

Walker was a strict vegetarian and became secretary of the Vegetarian Society in 1870, also serving as editor of its magazine, The Dietetic Reformer. He was the first vice-president of the Order of the Golden Age. In December 1884, Walker was ordained as an Anglican priest at Manchester Cathedral and served as honorary curate at St. Clement's Church in Longsight.

=== Personal life and death ===
Walker was married to Matilda Margaret "Dora" Walker. They had three children.

Walker died at St Leonards-on-Sea from the effects of a violent cold, aged 46. His funeral took place on 2 June 1885, at St John the Evangelist's Church, St Leonards-on-Sea, followed by his burial at Hastings Cemetery. William E. A. Axon and other friends attended.

A fund was set up by the Committee of the Vegetarian Society in Walker's honour to raise funds for his children and widow. Those who donated included notable vegetarians James Clark, Arnold Hills, Anna Kingsford, Edward Maitland, W. J. Monk, Isaac Pitman, John E. B. Mayor, and Howard Williams.

== Selected publications ==
Walker authored many pamphlets; a full list was published in his obituary in The Dietetic Reformer in 1885:

- The Old Oak Tree (1866)
- Arrangement of Work (1869)
- English Gleanings (1870)
- The Free Church and Offertory Movement (1871)
- Sketches of the Coroner's Court (1872)
- Sketches, Dietetic and Literary (1876)
- "Among the Cistercians at Mount St. Bernard" (PDF). Good Health. 14 (2): 39–41. 1879.
- Ten Year's Dietetic Crusade (1880)
- Almonds and Raisins: The Vegetarian Society's Annual (1884)
