= Tettenhall College =

Location
- Wood Road; Tettenhall; Wolverhampton, West Midlands, WV6 8QX; England; 52.5949°N 2.1696°W

Information
- Type: Private day and boarding school
- Motto: Timor Domini Initium Sapientiae (The fear of the Lord is the beginning of wisdom)
- Religious affiliation: Church of England (officially)
- Established: 1863
- Founders: Businessmen of the Queen Street Congregational Church
- Local authority: Wolverhampton
- Headmaster: Justin Gomersall
- Age: 2 to 18
- Enrolment: 430~
- Houses: (Upper and Lower schools only); Bantock; Haydon; Pearson; Nicholson
- Colours: Blue and light blue
- Website: www.tettenhallcollege.co.uk

Tettenhall College is a co-educational private day and boarding school located in the Wolverhampton suburb of Tettenhall in England.

== History ==
The college was founded in 1863 by a group of prominent local businessmen and industrialists, most of who were associated with the Queen Street Congregational Church. Tettenhall Towers was built by Wolverhampton industrialist Colonel Thomas Thorneycroft as a house for him and his family. The Towers Theatre was originally a ballroom and has springs under the floor to make it a better dancing surface. The stage was built later on for the school when it started. The school was sold by the last member of the Thorneycroft family in 1942. The college's lower school building was completed in September 2000 and the science department in 2007.

== Boarding ==
There are two boarding houses: Thorneycroft (girls) and School House (boys). Less than 15% of pupils board. Most boarders are international pupils or children of military personnel.

== Notable former pupils ==
- Nigel Bennett (born 1949), actor, director, author
- William Bidlake (1861–1938), Arts and Crafts architect
- Tom Fell (born 1993), professional cricketer
- Richard Dalziel Graham FRSE, (died 1920), educator and author
- Professor Sir Arthur Harden FRS (1865–1940), won Nobel Prize for Chemistry in 1929
- Rt. Hon. Anthony Hughes, Lord Hughes of Ombersley, Judge (born 1948)
- Nicholas Jones (born 1942), former BBC political correspondent
- Jeremy Middleton (born 1960), Vice Chairman of the Conservative Party and businessman.
- Charles Pearce (born 1943), calligrapher
- Peter Radford (born 1939), bronze medallist in the 100m and 4 × 100 m relay in Rome Olympic Games in 1960
- Mark Speight (1965 – 2008), television presenter
- David Sumberg (born 1941), MEP, former MP
- George Thorne (1853–1934), Liberal MP for Wolverhampton East 1908 - 1929, former Mayor and Alderman of Wolverhampton
- Harold W. Whiston (1873–1952), businessman and magistrate
- Brigadier Sir Edgar Williams (1912–1995), academic and soldier
