= Otto Abramowski =

Australian surgeon and naturopath (1852–1910)

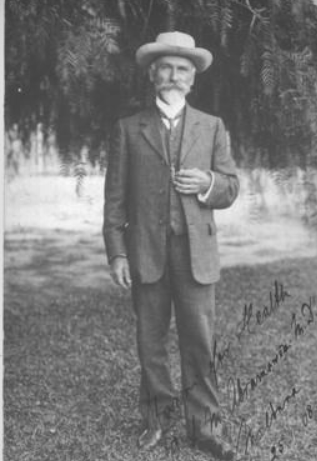
- Born: 1852; Osterode, Kingdom of Prussia
- Died: 14 December 1910 (aged 57–58); Elsternwick, Victoria
- Occupations: Surgeon, naturopath

Otto Louis Moritz Abramowski (1852 – 14 December 1910) was an Australian surgeon, naturopath, fruitarian and raw foodist.

== Biography ==
Abramowski was born in Osterode, Kingdom of Prussia. He studied medicine at University of Königsberg and the University of Berlin where he qualified M.D. in 1876. He was appointed an army surgeon in the German army in 1875 and held this position for eight years. He moved to Terowie, South Australia, in 1884. He was registered as a legally qualified medical practitioner in 1889. He moved to Mildura and was one of its first settlers where he lived and practiced for twenty years. He was an Irrigation Trust Commissioner in Mildura and served on the Horticultural Society Committee. He was interested in fruit and vegetable farming and planted 20 acres of asparagus. Abramowski opposed compulsory vaccination and was fined £2 in 1905 for non-compliance with the Vaccination Act.

He was appointed resident surgeon at Mildura District Hospital, a position he held until 1908 when he moved to Melbourne. Abramowski promoted fasting and a fruitarian diet known as a "fruit fast" to treat typhoid and many other diseases. He personally adopted a fruitarian diet and authored a book Eating for Health. He lectured on fruitarianism and the subject of anti-vaccination. He was a Freemason and Past Master of the Masonic Order. His first wife Martha Dorothea Miranda Abramowski died in Mildura in 1891. He married again several years later.

In the 1900s, he lectured on the benefits of a raw fruitarian diet with almonds and raisins. He argued that meat-eating was a cause of uric acid poisoning. He also opposed consumption of alcohol, bread, coffee and tea. In 1909, he patented a self preserved food composition made from nuts and raisins. His book Fruitarian Diet and Physical Rejuvenation first published in 1911 by the Order of the Golden Age sold well and was re-printed after World War II.

== Sun Sanitarium ==
Abramowski came to the conclusion that meat-eating is a major cause of disease and that fasting and fruit aids recovery. He established a naturopathic Sun Sanatorium in Coronet Hill, although it was not a financial success. His extreme ideas about fruit fasting were not popular with patients at his sanitarium which caused him disappointment so he compromised with them by prescribing a light fruit diet. Abramowski received opposition from the medical community and was described as a "lone fighter" for fasting.

== Death ==
Abramowski died on 14 December 1908, aged 58 at his residence in Elsternwick, Victoria. Lack of support for his ideas combined with the upkeep of his sanatorium is reported to have broken his health. Before his death he starved himself for some time. J. T. Huston known as "Nurse Olma" who revised Abramowski's book Eating for Health in 1913 stated that his early death was the result of dietary experiments that he practiced on himself.

== Selected publications ==
- Eating for Health (1907), republished as Vitalism: The Art of Eating for Health (1908)
- Fruitarian Diet and Physical Rejuvenation (1911, 1916)
