= John Todd Ferrier =

John Todd Ferrier (7 November 1855 — 31 August 1943) was the founder of the Christian theosophical group the Order of the Cross. The Order's aims and ideals state that it is an informal spiritual fellowship for "the cultivation of the Spirit of Love towards All Souls: helping the weak and defending the defenseless and oppressed: abstaining from hurting the creatures, eschewing bloodshed and flesh eating and living upon the pure foods so abundantly provided by Nature..." and for "sending forth the Mystic Teachings unto all who may be able to receive them".

Ferrier considered that compassion towards creatures was essential to realise 'Jesushood' within the soul. He was a proponent of Christian vegetarianism.

== Biography ==
Although biographical details are sparse, in 1947, E. Mary Gordon Kemmis wrote a biography and her memoirs of Ferrier: Shepherd of Souls: Some Impressions of the Life and Ministry of John Todd Ferrier. Ferrier was born in Greenock, Scotland in 1855. An early publication of some of his works, "Sacrifice a necessity; or the atonement in the light of our Lord's teaching, and the unfolding of the sacrificial idea", summarised eight lectures he delivered in 1885 at the Congregational Church in Preston where in 1888 he was reported to be a pastor. He was minister at Wigton from 1882 to 1883, then at Grimshaw Street, Preston, from 1884 to 1891; for the subsequent twelve years, until 1903, he was a minister in Park Green Congregational church in Macclesfield, England.

In 1903 Ferrier authored a book, Concerning Human Carnivorism. It was reprinted as On Behalf of the Creatures in 1968. Ferrier argued that Jesus was a vegetarian who espoused Essene-like asceticism.

== Founding of the Order of the Cross ==
Ferrier became increasingly dissatisfied with the traditional Christian attitude toward animals. For this and other reasons he left the church, and, via the Order of the Golden Age, in 1904 (1907 according to another source) founded the Order of the Cross. Some confusion over the date of establishing of the Order of the Cross may derive from its early publications containing the phrase "Formerly The Order of the Golden Age". In 1905 The Order of the Golden Age issued a disclaimer regarding the claimed overlap of the two Orders, and – following some discreet diplomacy – after 1906 the two became more widely recognised as distinct.

The Order's aims and ideals state that it is an informal spiritual fellowship, "having for its service in life the cultivation of the Spirit of Love towards All Souls: helping the weak and defending the defenseless and oppressed: abstaining from hurting the creatures, eschewing bloodshed and flesh eating and living upon the pure foods so abundantly provided by Nature: walking in the Mystic Way of Life whose Path leads to the realization of the Christhood and sending forth the Mystic Teachings unto all who may be able to receive them - those Sacred interpretations of the Soul, the Christhood and the Divine Love and Wisdom for which the Order of the Cross stands".

In the informal spiritual communion of the Order of the Cross, the members are both vegetarian or vegan and pacifist. Ferrier often spoke in defence of 'the creatures', and stated that a true Christian should be vegetarian. In his writings (over 40 volumes) he emphasised the underlying unity of all religious aspirations and suggested that many traditional Christian teachings are allegorical and universal in nature.

== Selected list of Ferrier's works ==
- The Mystery of the Light Within Us (Note: Ferrier, John Todd: The Mystery of the Light Within Us ISBN 0900235128/ ISBN 9780900235122)
- Life's Mysteries Unveiled (Note: Ferrier, John Todd: Life's Mysteries Unveiled ISBN 0900235071/ ISBN 978-0900235078)
- The Master, Known Unto the World As Jesus the Christ: His Life & Teachings (Note: Ferrier, John Todd: The Master, Known Unto the World As Jesus the Christ: His Life & Teachings ISBN 9781117392011)
- Spiritual Healing (Note: Ferrier, John Todd: Spiritual Healing ISBN 9780900235665)
- Isaiah: A Cosmic and Messianic Drama (Note: Ferrier, John Todd: Isaiah: A Cosmic and Messianic Drama ISBN 090023511X)
- The Minor Prophets (Note: Ferrier, John Todd: The Minor Prophets ISBN 9780900235405)
- Ezekiel: A Cosmic Drama (Note: Ferrier, John Todd: Ezekiel: A Cosmic Drama ISBN 9780900235108)
- Logia: or Sayings of the Master (4th Revised edition) (Note: Ferrier, John Todd: Logia: or Sayings of the Master (4th Revised edition) ISBN 9780900235061)
- Divine Renaissance (Note: Ferrier, John Todd: Divine Renaissance Vols 1 & 2 ISBN 9780900235085)
- The Pathway to Peace (Note: Ferrier, John Todd: The Pathway to Peace ISBN 9780900235634)
- The Message and the Work (Note: Ferrier, John Todd: The Message and the Work ISBN 9780900235023)
- The Prophecy of Daniel (Note: Ferrier, John Todd: The Prophecy of Daniel ISBN 9780900235702)
- The Christ Festival (Note: Ferrier, John Todd: The Christ Festival ISBN 9780900235528)
- On Behalf of the Creatures: a plea historical, scientific, economic, dynamic, humane, religious (Note: Ferrier, John Todd: On Behalf of the Creatures: a plea historical, scientific, economic, dynamic, humane, religious ISBN 9780900235511)
- What is a Christian (Note: Ferrier, John Todd: What is a Christian ISBN 9780900235009)
- Sublime Affirmations (Note: Ferrier, John Todd: Sublime Affirmations ISBN 9787300980980)

== See also ==
- International Vegetarian Union
