= Order of the Golden Age =

Defunct international Christian vegetarian organisation

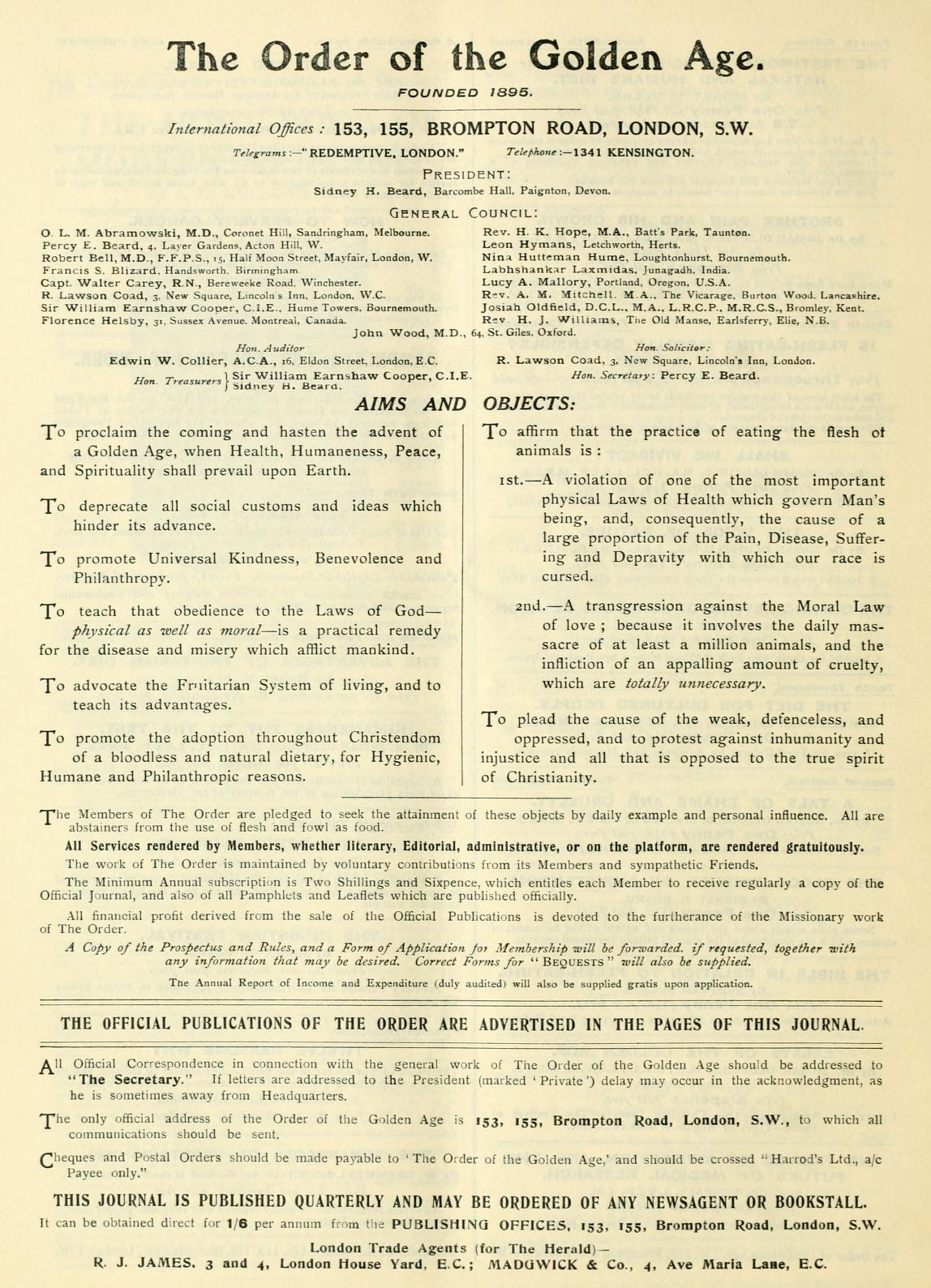
- Information page from The Herald of the Golden Age (April 1910)
- Abbreviation: OGA
- Formation: 1882; 144 years ago (constituted); 1895; 131 years ago (revival)
- Founders: Henry John Williams; Sidney H. Beard (revival)
- Founded at: Brympton, Somerset, England
- Dissolved: 1959; 67 years ago
- Type: Christian organisation
- Headquarters: Ilfracombe; later Barcombe Hall, Paignton; subsequently London
- Region served: Worldwide
- Methods: Publishing; advocacy; public meetings; concerts
- President: Henry John Williams (1881–c. 1888); Sidney H. Beard (1895–1938)
- Main organ: The Herald of the Golden Age (1896–1918)
- Formerly called: Order of the Companions of the Golden Age

The Order of the Golden Age (OGA) was an international Christian vegetarian and humanitarian organisation active from 1895 to 1959, with antecedents in 1881–82. It originated as the Order of the Companions of the Golden Age, founded by Rev. Henry John Williams, and was re-established in 1895 by Sidney H. Beard. The earlier organisation became inactive for lack of funds and was later treated by the Order as a precursor to the 1895 body.

The OGA promoted a form of fruitarianism and linked dietary reform with Christian ethics, humanitarianism and anti-vivisection advocacy. It also published material on psychical research and spiritualism. Its periodical was The Herald of the Golden Age (1896–1918). The organisation held meetings and fundraising concerts, including at the Royal Albert Hall in 1910, and reported activity in 47 countries. Its headquarters moved from Ilfracombe to Barcombe Hall, Paignton, and later to London. Activity in Britain declined after Beard's death in 1938, and later work was centred in South Africa until the organisation closed in 1959.

== History ==
=== Origins (1881–1888) ===
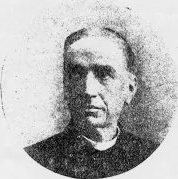
Henry John Williams, founder and first president

The Order originated in 1881 when Rev. Henry John Williams (younger brother of Howard Williams, later an influence on, and founder of, the Humanitarian League) outlined a devotional fellowship, the Order of the Companions of the Golden Age, commemorating James the Less and guided by the motto Non nocebunt et non occident ("They will not harm and they will not kill"). A first general meeting on 8 September 1881 at Brympton, Somerset, elected Williams as president, with R. Bailey Walker as vice-president and Frederick L. Catcheside as treasurer. The society was formally constituted the following year.

By 1888, the Order appeared defunct. Contemporary accounts cited insufficient funds as the reason it became inactive. Later material from the revived organisation acknowledged the 1881 conception but treated 1895 as the effective starting point.

=== Re-establishment (1895–1904) ===
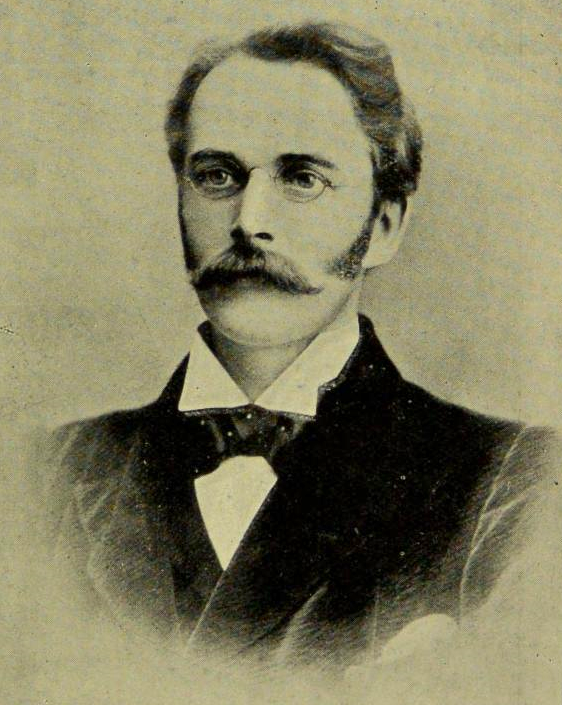
Sidney H. Beard, who re-established the society and served as its president from 1895

In 1895 vegetarian activist Sidney H. Beard re-established the society as the Order of the Golden Age. The headquarters were initially at Beard's residence in Ilfracombe. The OGA promoted psychical research, spiritualism and vegetarianism. A London conference in 1897, held at St. Martin's Town Hall, featured speakers including Rev. J. H. N. Nevill, J. I. Pengelly, Frances L. Boult, Charles W. Forward and May Yates; messages from members abroad were read. In 1904 the headquarters moved to Barcombe Hall, Paignton.

==== Aims ====
The Order promoted vegetarianism from a Christian perspective and presented dietary reform as part of moral and religious renewal. Its stated aims included:

[t]o proclaim a message of Peace and Happiness, Health and Purity, Life and Power [and] [t]o hasten the coming of the Golden Age when Love and Righteousness shall reign upon earth ... by proclaiming obedience to the laws of God.

The Order's periodical, The Herald of the Golden Age (1896–1918), edited by Beard, advanced what it termed a "fruitarian" (Note: At the time, the term 'fruitarian' was used with a variety of meanings, see e.g. "Oldfield's type of 'fruitarian dietary' was not a strict type of fruitarianism".) system of living.

==== Name and identity disputes ====
In 1896 Rev. Gideon Jasper Richard Ouseley, founder of the Order of the Golden Age and United Templary, disputed the revived society's use of the name and complained that it was being confused with his organisation. In 1904 the OGA was reconstituted and declared to be "founded in 1895 by Sidney H. Beard", with Williams's consent.

==== Organisation and membership ====
From 1901 to 1903 George Cozens Prior served as honorary solicitor to the Order. By 1909 the OGA reported activity in 47 countries and had transferred its headquarters to London. The Order organised concerts at the Royal Albert Hall in 1910. Notable members included the lawyer and vegetarianism activist Josiah Oldfield.

==== Position on fish consumption ====
The OGA did not forbid fish consumption. In 1902, a statement printed in The Herald of the Golden Age asserted:

...the eating of fish caught in a net has never been forbidden to members of The Order, and the original rule still remains in force... The Order stands on the basis of its original foundation, and this foundation declared that the eating of net-caught fish should not exclude from membership.

The OGA had two classes of membership, companions and associates. Companions abstained from fish, poultry and red meat, while associates abstained from poultry and red meat. Both were considered members of the Order.

The OGA's position on fish eating was criticised in an article in The British Medical Journal, which asked "is not a fish as much deserving of consideration on 'humanitarian grounds' as a sheep?"

==== Reported claims ====
In 1907 the Order's journal asserted that Pope Pius X had adopted a vegetarian diet; this was presented as the OGA's claim in its own publication.

=== Interwar currents and decline (1930s–1959) ===
During the 1930s some British fascists were drawn to aspects of the OGA's emphasis on natural living, linking dietary reform with ideas of national renewal; Oldfield's later writings endorsed eugenic ideas, including euthanasia for the "unfit". According to Bates, this association increased visibility briefly but became a liability as the Second World War approached. Following Beard's death in 1938, the Order's activities in Britain declined. It subsequently relocated to South Africa, where it continued until 1959.

== Legacy ==
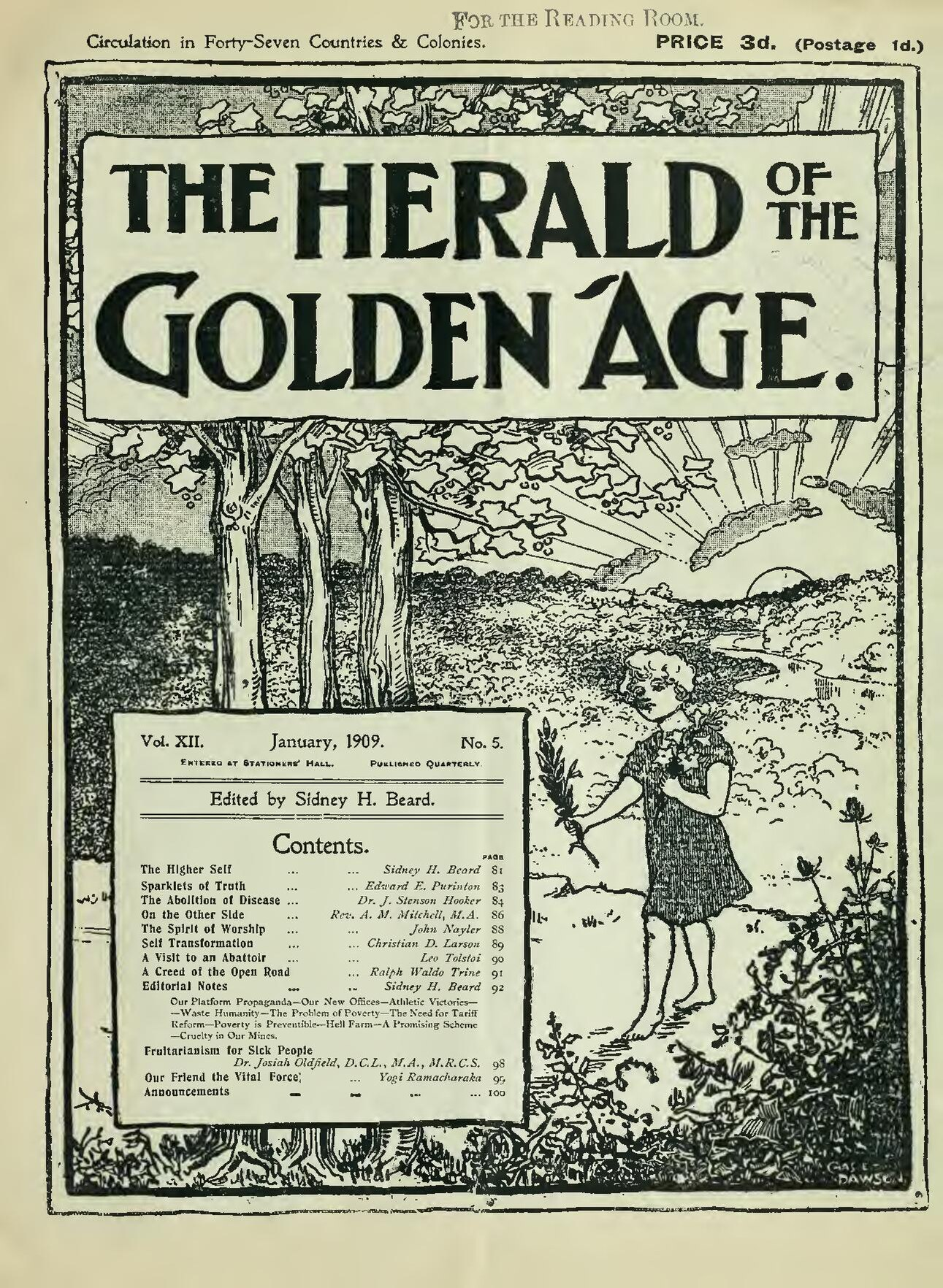
The Herald of the Golden Age, January 1909

A commemorative website was launched in 2006. The following year, James Gregory's Of Victorians and Vegetarians, a study of vegetarianism in the Victorian era, discussed the OGA. In 2008, many issues of The Herald of the Golden Age held at Robarts Library (Toronto) were digitised and made available on the Internet Archive.

== Council members ==
Notable council members include:

1897–1913	Sidney H. Beard (also president)
1897–1897	Edmund J. Baillie
1897–1897	Robert Semple
1897–1905	Frances L. Boult
1897–1899	Albert Broadbent
1897–1897	Charles W. Forward
1897–1898	J. Isaac Pengelly
1897–1903	Harold W. Whiston
1897–1913	Henry John Williams
1898–1898	James Christopher Street
1898–1913	Alfred Mansfield Mitchell
1899–1904	Arthur Harvie
1899–1904	Walter Walsh
1900–1902, 1905–1913	Josiah Oldfield
1901–1904	Robert H. Perks
1902–1904	Charles A. Hall
1902–1904	John Todd Ferrier
1902–1907	Eustace H. Miles
1907–1908	James Edge Partington
1907–1909	Ernest Newlandsmith
1907–1913	Robert Bell
1910–1911	Otto Abramowski

== See also ==
- List of vegetarian and vegan organizations
- Christianity and animal rights
- Humanitarian League
- Vegetarianism in the Victorian era
