= Sidney H. Beard =

English vegetarian activist (1862–1938)

Sidney Hartnoll Beard
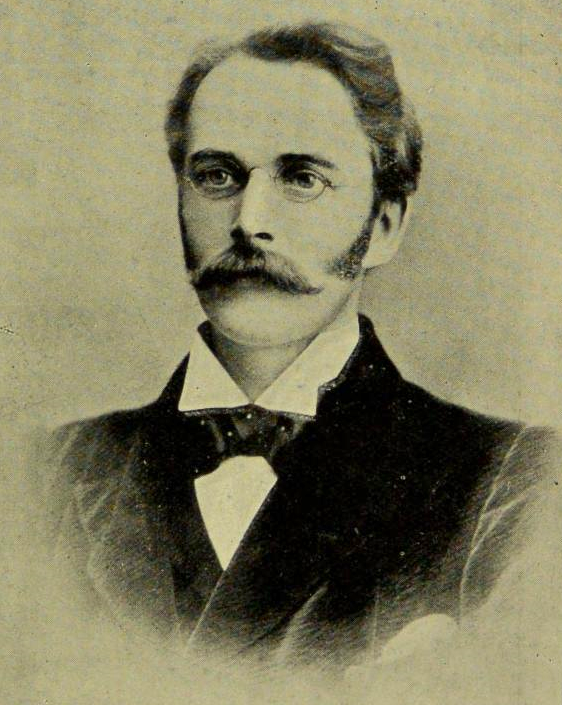
- Portrait from Fifty Years of Food Reform (1898)
- Born: 14 February 1862; Kensington, London, England
- Died: 20 October 1938 (aged 76); Putney, London, England
- Occupations: Vegetarianism activist, writer
- Organization(s): Order of the Golden Age (founder and president)
- Spouse: Annie Patterson
- Children: 3

Sidney Hartnoll Beard (14 February 1862 – 20 October 1938) was an English vegetarian and fruitarian activist and writer. He re-established and served as president of the Order of the Golden Age, edited its journal, the Herald of the Golden Age (1896–1918), and advanced a Christian case for vegetarianism framed as a moral duty. Defining fruitarianism broadly to include cereals, seeds, nuts, fruits, and vegetables with dairy and eggs permitted, he treated fish as a transitional food for those leaving flesh-eating.

Operating from Ilfracombe and, from 1904, Barcombe Hall in Paignton, he organised lectures and public outreach, including a 1908 address with Josiah Oldfield at the Cambridge Guildhall. His publications were A Simple Guide to a Natural and Humane Diet (1898), Is Flesh-Eating Morally Defensible? (1898), A Comprehensive Guide-Book to Natural, Hygienic and Humane Diet (1902), and Our Real Relationship to God: The Lost Ideal of Christianity, by a Disciple of the Christ (1922).

== Biography ==
=== Early life ===
Beard was born in Kensington, London, on 14 February 1862. He became a vegetarian in 1894, at the age of 32.

=== Order of the Golden Age ===
Beard re-established the Order of the Golden Age in 1895, serving as president. The Order's headquarters were located at his residence in Ilfracombe, and from 1904 at Barcombe Hall in Paignton. Charles W. Forward characterised him as having "militant enthusiasm, intense earnestness and unswerving faith" in his work for the society.

Beard was editor of the Herald of the Golden Age (1896–1918), the Order's journal. The journal promoted the "fruitarian system of living" and advanced vegetarianism from a Christian perspective; Beard held that a vegetarian diet was a moral duty. He also campaigned against vivisection and for the humane treatment of animals as part of his Christian beliefs.

=== Fruitarianism ===
Beard argued that "the first step must be abstinence from the flesh and blood of animals and birds"; fish could be included as a transitional stage toward fruitarianism.

With Josiah Oldfield, he lectured on the benefits of fruitarianism at the Cambridge Guildhall Council Chamber in 1908. As with Oldfield, Beard's usage of "fruitarianism" was not strict and included dairy and egg products. He defined it as "systematic living upon the various fruits of the earth, instead of upon the products of the shambles", listing cereals, seeds, nuts, fruits, and vegetables, supplemented by dairy and eggs; he held that such a regime supported a humane and hygienic life, free from the butchery of animal flesh.

=== Writing ===
Beard authored A Comprehensive Guide-Book to Natural, Hygienic and Humane Diet (1902). The health writer Carl Malmberg criticised the book for making extremist claims.

=== Personal life and death ===
Beard married Annie Patterson and they had 3 children. He and his wife were both members of The Salvation Army. They were also spiritualists.

Beard died in Putney on 20 October 1938.

== Selected publications ==
- A Simple Guide to a Natural and Humane Diet (1898)
- Is Flesh-Eating Morally Defensible? (1898)
- A Comprehensive Guide-Book to Natural, Hygienic and Humane Diet (1902)
- Our Real Relationship to God: The Lost Ideal of Christianity, by a Disciple of the Christ (1922)
