= Fruitarianism =

Diet based primarily on fruits

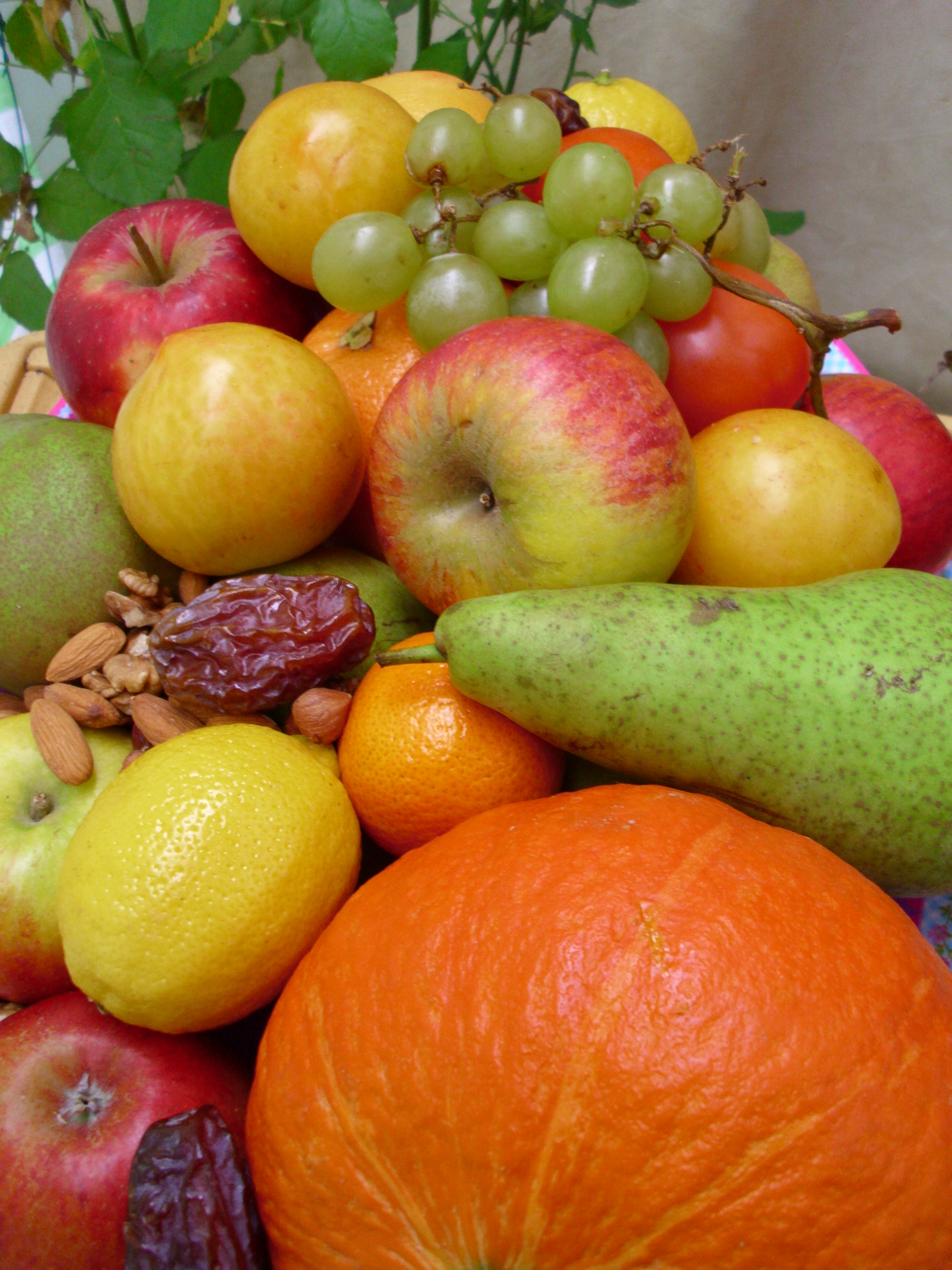
Varied fruits

Fruitarianism (/fruːˈtɛəriənɪzəm/) is a diet that consists primarily of consuming fruits and possibly nuts and seeds, but without any animal products. Fruitarian diets are subject to criticism and health concerns.

Fruitarianism may be adopted for different reasons, including ethical, religious, environmental, cultural, economic, and presumed health benefits. A fruitarian diet may increase the risk of nutritional deficiencies, such as reduced intake of vitamin B12, calcium, iron, zinc, omega-3 or protein.

== Varieties ==
Some fruitarians will eat only what falls naturally from a plant; that is, plant foods that can be harvested without killing or harming the plant. These foods consist primarily of culinary fruits, nuts, and seeds. Some do not eat grains, believing it is unnatural to do so, and some fruitarians feel that it is improper for humans to eat seeds as they contain future plants, or nuts and seeds, or any food besides juicy fruit. Others believe they should eat only plants that spread seeds when the plant is eaten. Others eat seeds and some cooked foods. Some fruitarians use the botanical definitions of fruits and consume pulses, such as beans, peas, or other legumes. Other fruitarians' diets include raw fruits, dried fruits, nuts, honey and olive oil, nuts, beans or chocolate.

== Ideology and diet ==
Some fruitarians, like Jains, wish to avoid killing anything, including plants, and refer to ahimsa fruitarianism. For some fruitarians, the motivation comes from a fixation on a utopian past, their hope being to return to a past that pre-dates an agrarian society to when humans were simply gatherers. Another common motivation is the desire to eliminate perceived toxicity from within the body. For others, the appeal of a fruitarian diet comes from the challenge that the restrictive nature of this diet provides.

== Nutrition ==
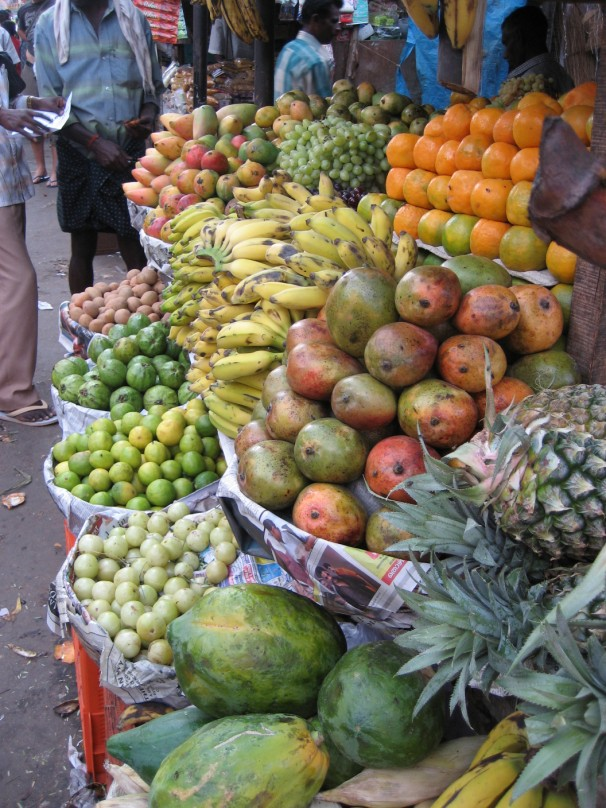
Tropical fruits (South India)

According to nutritionists, adults must be careful not to follow a fruit-only diet for too long. A fruitarian diet is wholly unsuitable for children, teens, and nursing mothers and their babies. Death can result from malnutrition.

=== Nutritional effects ===
Fruitarianism is more restrictive than veganism or raw veganism, as a subset of both. Maintaining this diet over a long period can result in dangerous deficiencies, a risk that many fruitarians try to ward off through nutritional testing and vitamin injections. The Health Promotion Program at Columbia University reports that a fruitarian diet can cause deficiencies in calcium, protein, iron, zinc, vitamin D, most B vitamins (especially B_{12}), and essential fatty acids.

Although fruit provides a source of carbohydrates, they have very little protein, and because protein cannot be stored in the body as fat and carbohydrates can, fruitarians need to be careful that they consume enough protein each day. When the body does not absorb enough protein, it leads to a deficiency of amino acids, which are essential to creating body proteins which support the growth and maintenance of body tissues. Consuming high amounts of fruit also poses a risk to those who are diabetic or pre-diabetic, due to the negative effect that the large amount of sugar in fruits has on blood sugar levels. These high levels of sugar mean that fruitarians are at a higher risk for tooth decay. Another concern that fruitarianism presents is that because fruit is easily digested, the body burns through meals quickly, and is hungry again soon after eating. A side effect of the digestibility is that the body will defecate more frequently. Additionally, the Health Promotion Program at Columbia reports that food restrictions in general may lead to hunger, cravings, food obsessions, social disruptions, and social isolation. The severe dietary restrictions inherent in a fruitarian regime also carries the serious risk of triggering orthorexia nervosa.

Harriet Hall has written that a fruitarian diet "leads to nutritional deficiencies, especially in children. Fruitarians can develop protein energy malnutrition, anemia, and low levels of iron, calcium, essential fatty acids, vitamins, and minerals."

==== Vitamin B_{12} ====
Vitamin B_{12}, a bacterial product, cannot be obtained from fruits. According to the U.S. National Institutes of Health, "natural food sources of vitamin B_{12} are limited to foods that come from animals." Like raw vegans who do not consume B_{12}-fortified foods (for example, certain plant milks and some breakfast cereals), fruitarians may need to include a B_{12} supplement in their diet or risk vitamin B_{12} deficiency.

=== Growth and development concerns ===
In children, growth and development may be at risk. Some nutritionists state that children should not follow a fruitarian diet. Nutritional problems include severe protein–energy malnutrition, anemia and deficiencies including protein, iron, calcium, essential fatty acids, raw fibre and a wide range of vitamins and minerals.

== Notable adherents ==
Some notable advocates of fruitarianism, or of diets which may be considered fruitarian, or of lifestyles including such a diet, are:

- Otto Abramowski, Australian naturopath who lectured on the fruitarian diet.
- Idi Amin, the Ugandan military dictator who became a fruitarian while exiled in Saudi Arabia.
- Sidney H. Beard
- Arnold Ehret
- August Engelhardt
- Raymond W. Bernard
- Hereward Carrington
- Mohandas Karamchand Gandhi, better known as Indian political and spiritual leader Mahatma Gandhi, sustained a fruitarian diet for five years. He apparently discontinued the diet and went back to vegetarianism due to pleurisy, a pre-existing condition, after pressure from Dr. Jivraj Mehta.
- Ben Klassen
- Author Morris Krok, who earlier in his life lived "only on fruits", allegedly advised against a diet of "only fruit", although it was subsequently reported that Krok's diet consisted of "just fruit", with dietary practices of fruitarians as varied as definitions of the term "fruitarianism".
- Apple cofounder Steve Jobs began fruitarianism as a college freshman, and practiced it later in life.
- Actor Ashton Kutcher was hospitalized and said that his "pancreas levels were completely out of whack" after following a fruitarian diet in preparation for his role playing Apple Inc. CEO and onetime fruitarian Steve Jobs, in the film Jobs.
- The Order of the Golden Age published the journal Herald of the Golden Age (1896–1918), which promoted a "fruitarian system of living".
- Timothy Redmond, drummer of the band Snapcase.
- Gustav Schlickeysen
- W. B. Shearn, florist who managed the first fruitarian restaurant in London.
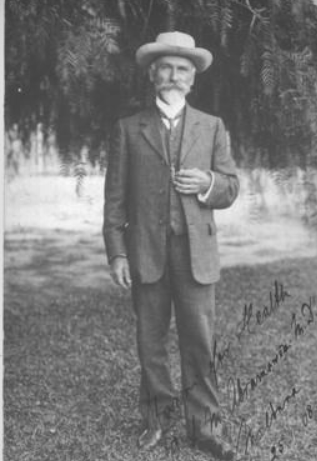
Otto Abramowski

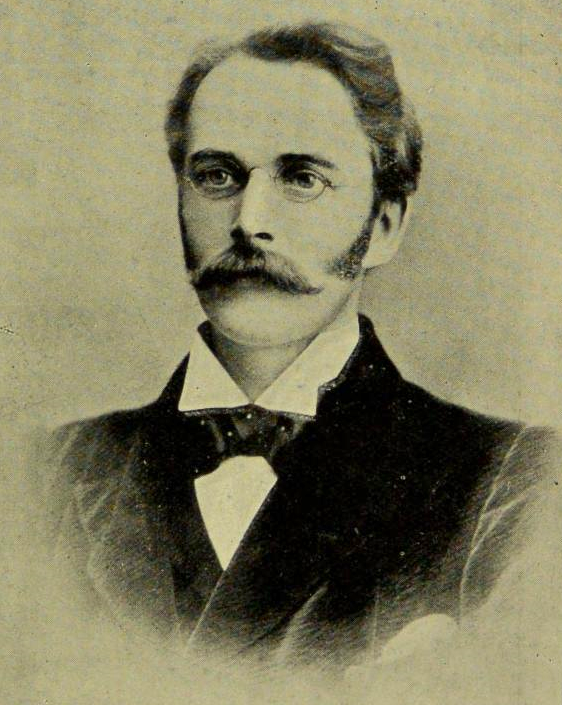
Sidney H. Beard

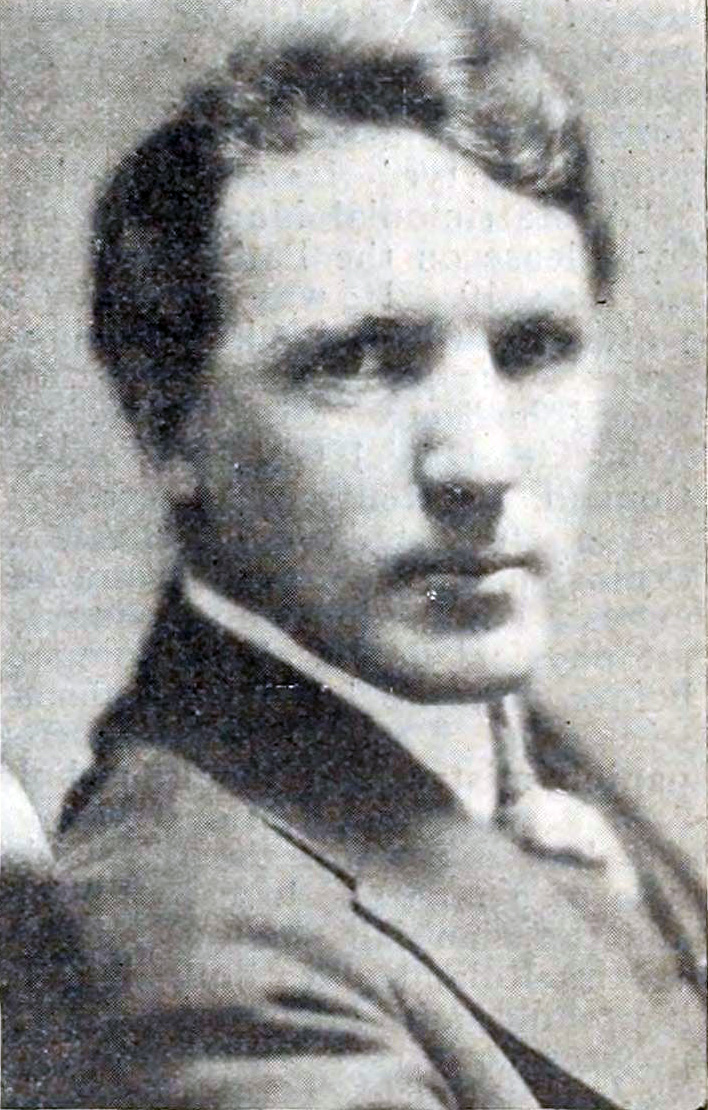
Hereward Carrington

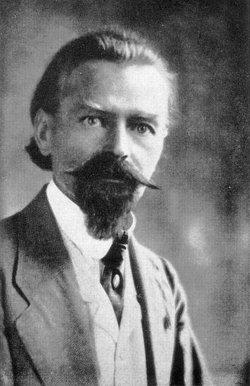
Arnold Ehret

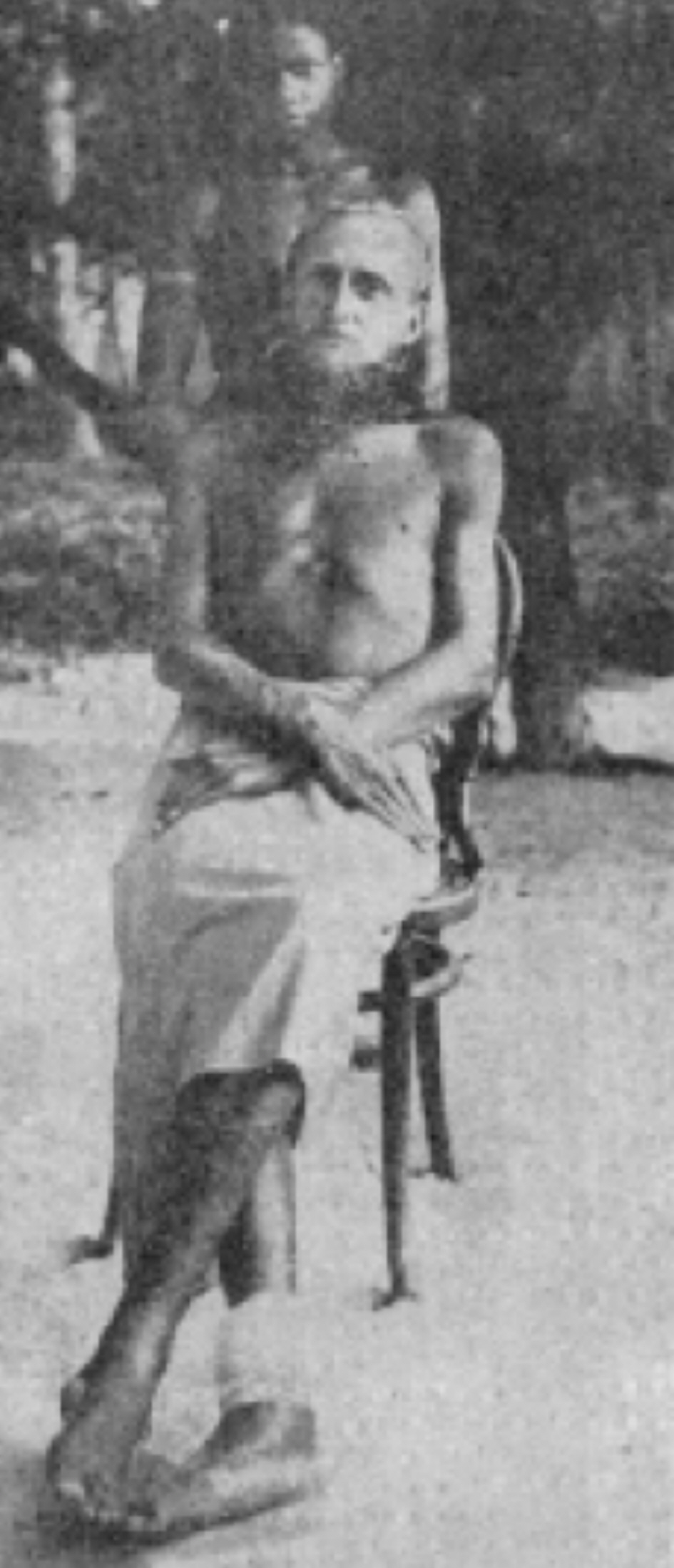
August Engelhardt

== In popular culture ==
The minor character Keziah in the 1999 film Notting Hill (played by Emma Bernard) tells William "Will" Thacker (Hugh Grant) that she is a fruitarian. She says she believes that "fruits and vegetables have feeling," meaning she opposes cooking them, only eating things that have "actually fallen off a tree or bush" and that are dead already, leading to what some describe as a negative depiction.

Both fruitarians and nutarians are mentioned in Ulysses by James Joyce. Dick Gregory also promoted the former in his book, Cooking with Mother Nature. In the television show Pluribus, the human collective stated that they will collect fallen fruit, but won't harvest it from trees.

== See also ==
- Frugivore
- Jain vegetarianism
- List of culinary fruits
- List of diets
