= Josiah Oldfield =

English lawyer, physician, activist, and writer (1863–1953)

Josiah Oldfield TD MRCS LRCP
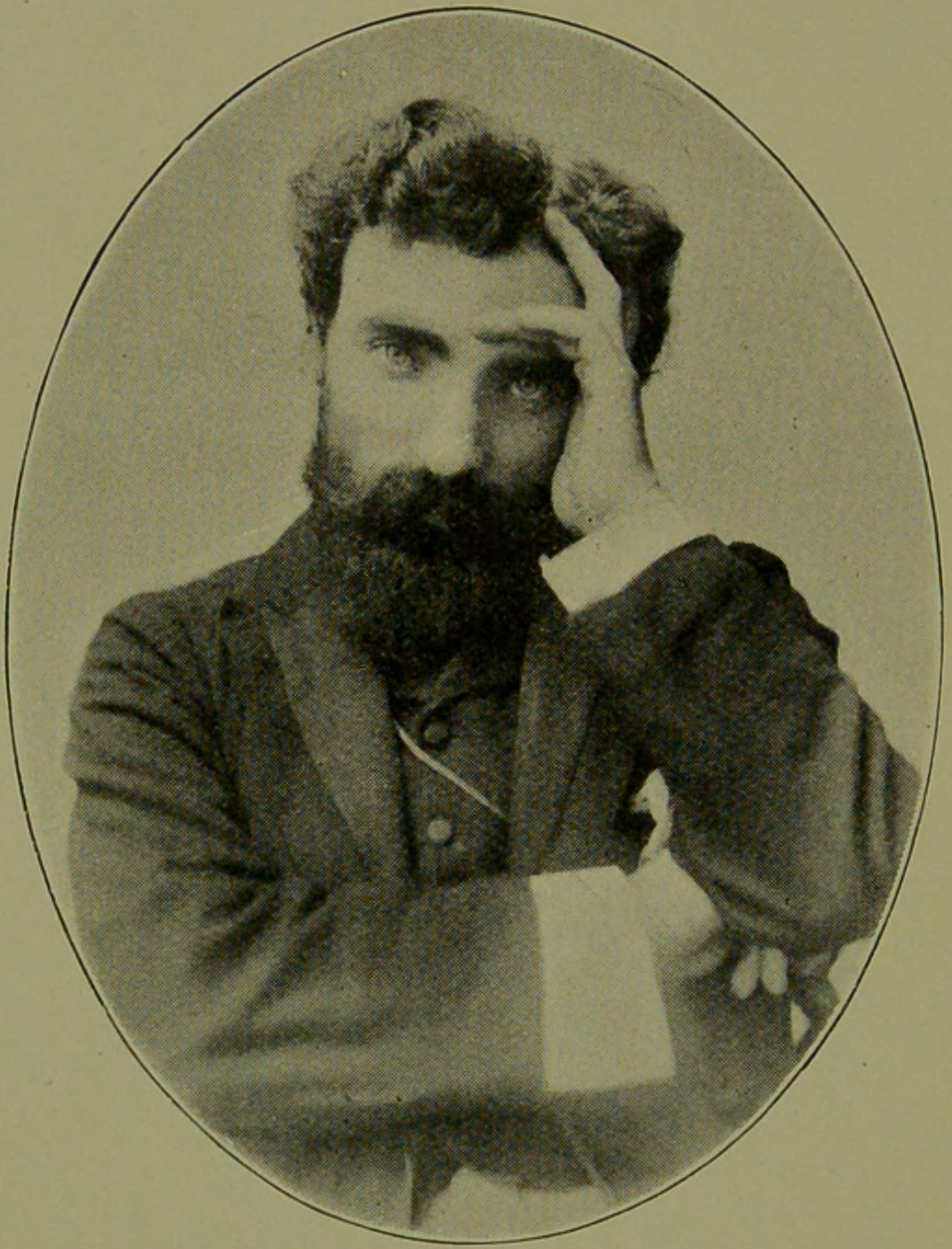
- Portrait from Fifty Years of Food Reform
- Born: 28 February 1863; Shrewsbury, England
- Died: 2 February 1953 (aged 89); Doddington, Kent, England
- Education: University of Oxford; St Bartholomew's Hospital Medical School
- Occupations: Lawyer; physician; activist; writer
- Spouse: Gertrude Hick (m. 1899, separated)
- Children: 2
- Military career
- Allegiance: United Kingdom
- Branch: Royal Army Medical Corps
- Units: Essex Regiment, 1st Volunteer Battalion; 3rd East Anglian Field Ambulance Corps
- Conflict: World War I
- Awards: Territorial Decoration

Signature
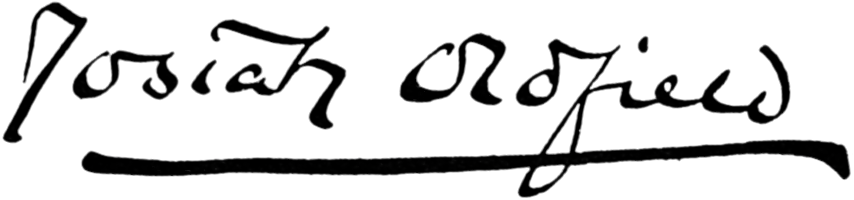

Josiah Oldfield TD MRCS LRCP (28 February 1863 – 2 February 1953) was an English lawyer, physician, activist, and writer. He used the term fruitarianism for a diet that included eggs and dairy products and was close to lacto-ovo vegetarianism. Oldfield wrote popular books on diet and health. He also served in the Royal Army Medical Corps and received the Territorial Decoration for his service in World War I.

== Biography ==
=== Early life and education ===
The son of David Oldfield of Ryton, Shropshire, a provision dealer, and his wife Margaret Bates, Oldfield was born on 28 February 1863 in Shrewsbury. His father, who died in 1903, was a church organist in nearby Condover from around the time of Josiah's birth.

Oldfield was educated at Newport Grammar School. He then taught as an assistant master at Chipping Campden School.

Oldfield matriculated in 1882 at the University of Oxford as a non-collegiate student and graduated B.A. in 1885, with second-class honours in civil law and theology. While there, he became a vegetarian and concluded that meat-eating was unnecessary. He was called to the bar by Lincoln's Inn and practised as a barrister on the Oxford court circuit. He then studied medicine at St. Bartholomew's Hospital Medical School and qualified in 1897.

=== Activism ===
==== Vegetarianism ====
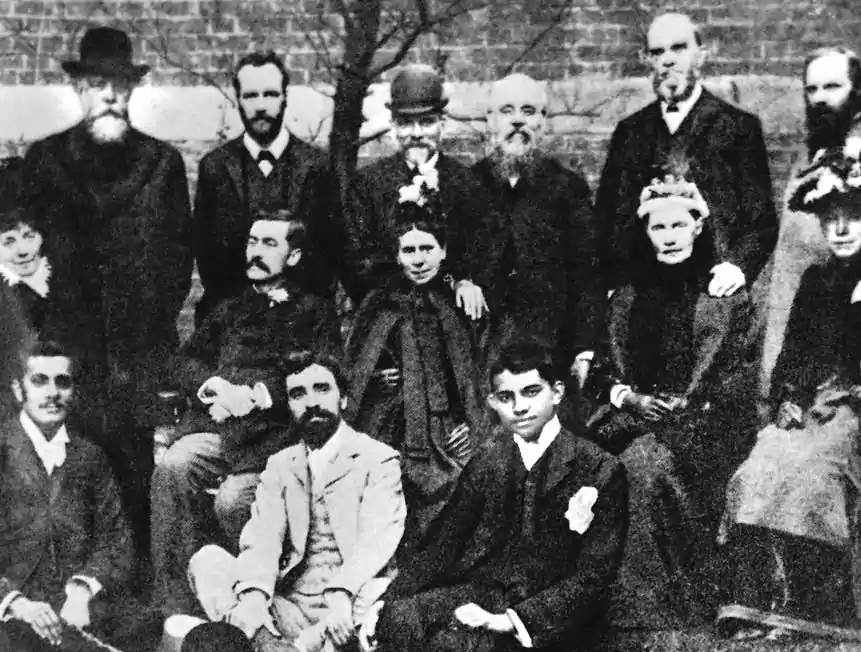
London Vegetarian Society members at Portsmouth, May 1891; Oldfield is seated in the front row, second from left

Oldfield was president of the West London Food Reform Society, a vegetarian group based in Bayswater, founded in 1891. Edwin Arnold was vice-president and Mohandas Gandhi was secretary. Oldfield met Gandhi through Pranjivan Mehta in 1890, and the two became friends, sharing rooms in Bayswater for some months in 1891.

Oldfield was associated with the London Vegetarian Society and edited its publication, The Vegetarian. He was also secretary of the Vegetarian Federal Union. He was a member of the Order of the Golden Age and the Humanitarian League.

In 1895, Oldfield searched for alternatives to leather for boots, experimenting with boots made from India rubber, gutta-percha, and asbestos. He found faults with all of those substances, but expressed optimism about a "vegetarian" boot. That year he submitted a paper on vegetarian boots to the autumn congress of the Vegetarian Federal Union held in Birmingham.

In the early 1900s, Oldfield became disillusioned with the term vegetarianism. In 1907, he wrote that "some people imagine that I am a vegetarian and that my opinion, therefore, on the question of food is warped by a certain faddism. Now, this is untrue. I am not a vegetarian and have no connection with any vegetarian society."

Oldfield wrote the entry "Vegetarianism" for the Encyclopædia Britannica (11th edition, 1911), although he did not identify himself as a vegetarian. He stated that "I object absolutely to vegetarianism, because the word smacks of onions and cabbage. It gives people the idea that you live on watercress and browse on odds and ends of garbage." He described himself as an Aristophagist, meaning "eaters of the best - men and women who refuse to eat the common garbage of the undeveloped."

==== Fruitarianism ====
Oldfield advocated fruitarianism, which brought him into conflict with the Vegetarian Society. He was a member of the Fruitarian Society, whose members lived on "the produce of harvest field, garden, forest and orchard, with milk, butter, cheese, eggs and honey". His own "fruitarianism" was close to ovo-lacto vegetarianism. He was not a vegan: he recommended a daily diet of dandelion leaves, eggs, grapes, honey, lettuce, milk, salad, and watercress. He opposed slaughterhouses and vivisection.

A reviewer in 1909 noted that "as fruitarian dietary includes milk, butter, eggs, cheese, and honey, along with fruits, nuts, and vegetables, healthy existence is quite possible for Dr Oldfield and his followers." A recipe of his, "Margaret Plum Pudding", was included in Cecilia Maria de Candia's cookbook, The Kitchen Garden and the Cook (1913). In 1931, Oldfield commented that "I am proud to say that the only point on which we of the Fruitarian Society disagree with Mr. Gandhi is that Mr. Gandhi will not eat eggs, because they contain Life." In 1949, he said that "as a scientist I am a fruitarian, and live on the kindly fruits of the earth which include eggs, milk, butter, cheese and honey".

=== Hospital founder ===
While he was a medical student, Oldfield was involved with the Oriolet Hospital, founded in 1895 in Loughton, Essex. It required vegetarianism of its patients. The hospital was endorsed by the Order of the Golden Age, and partly funded by Arnold Hills. Oldfield admitted patients there, initially with the title of warden, supported by a medical officer. Gertrude Hick, the nurse whom Oldfield later married, was trained in London and appointed sister in charge at the hospital in early 1895. By 1904 it had become the Oriolet Hygienic Home of Rest and Open Air Cottage Hospital, run by Florence Booth for the Salvation Army.

In 1897, Oldfield announced the foundation of the Hospital of St Francis in south London, on anti-vivisection principles. It had up to a dozen beds in a converted town house on New Kent Road, and provided out-patient care. It closed around 1904, and its funding was transferred to Battersea General Hospital. Oldfield was senior physician to the Lady Margaret Fruitarian Hospital in Bromley, which he founded in 1903. No alcohol, fish, or meat was permitted at the hospital; food was cooked in coconut oil. In 1914, Oldfield stated that "nothing is brought within the walls of the hospital that is dead; and as a result very little that is dead goes out".

==== Lady Margaret Manor ====
In 1908, Oldfield founded the fruitarian Margaret Manor hospital in Doddington, Kent. The hospital at Lady Margaret Manor was on a farm estate surrounded by woodland. The estate also included an orphanage and workshop. Lady Margaret Manor was known as the "Fruitarian Village".

In 1933, Oldfield's cottage at Doddington burnt down and his library was destroyed. Oldfield, who was downstairs at the time, said that a log must have fallen from the fireplace onto the carpet upstairs.

In 1935, Oldfield founded a fruitarian colony for retired men at Lady Margaret Manor. The men worked in the grounds of the manor, growing vegetables, milking cows, and working in the woodland. The estate housed 13 men, who received food, lodging, and pocket money. Several were over 77 years old, and one was a war-wounded wood carver. The men had built a small chapel in the grounds. The Daily Mirror described the estate as a "wood Kentish paradise" for old men.

=== Army surgeon ===
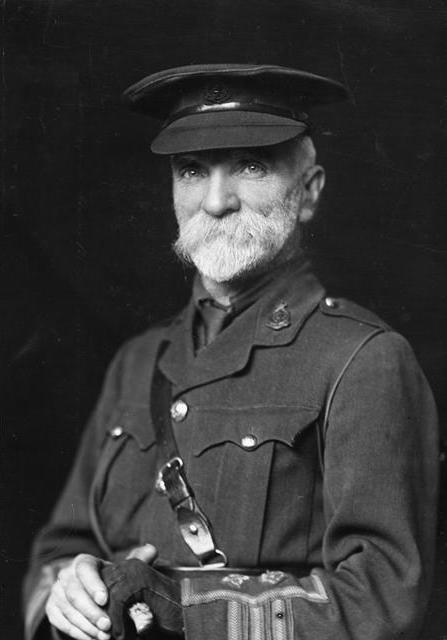
Oldfield in military uniform

Oldfield shared the pacifist views of the Order of the Golden Age. In 1898, he joined the Essex Regiment, 1st Volunteer Battalion as an army surgeon with the rank of Lieutenant, serving until 1901. In 1913, as a major, he criticised the absence of standard training for regimental medical officers of the Territorial Army. During World War I, he held a commission as lieutenant-colonel of the 3rd East Anglian Field Ambulance Corps, a Territorial unit in the Royal Army Medical Corps, raising and commanding a casualty clearing station that served on the Western Front, for which he was mentioned in despatches. His service ended in 1918 after he was thrown from a horse. He was awarded the Territorial Decoration.

=== Legal reformer ===
In 1901, the University of Oxford awarded Oldfield a doctorate in civil law for his thesis on capital punishment. The Penalty of Death combined criminological, legal, and sociological arguments in support of abolishing the death penalty. He founded the Society for the Abolition of Capital Punishment in the same year. He became chairman of the Romilly Society, a pressure group for penal reform founded in 1897, in 1910.

=== India ===
Oldfield subscribed to Catherine Impey's periodical Anti-Caste. He made an investigative visit to India in 1901. His personal connections to India included contacts in Kathiawar, the home region of Gandhi, who was born at Porbandar; and his best man at his wedding in 1899 was Trimbakrai Jadavrai Desai, then a law student at Gray's Inn in London, from Limbdi State of the Kathiawar Agency. His experiences formed the basis of a series of articles in The Leisure Hour. One concerned Bhavnagar State in eastern Kathiawar and a visit on which he was accompanied by Prabhashankar Pattani. In April 1903, Oldfield published an article in the Hibbert Journal titled "The Failure of Christian Missions in India".

=== Later life and death ===
Oldfield became a fellow of the Royal Society of Medicine in 1920. He died in 1953 at the age of 89, in Doddington, Kent.

== Views ==
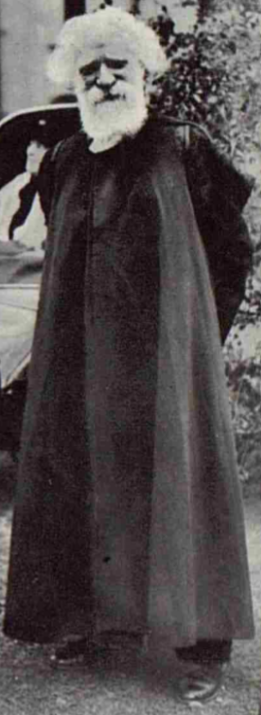
Oldfield in 1938

In 1891, Oldfield attempted to convert Gandhi to Anglicanism, urging him to read the Bible. By the 20th century, he had changed his own views. In 1904, he commented that "as a medical man, seeing much of pain and suffering and dying, my experience does not lead me to think that it is the profession of the Christian creed which is by any means the sole method of securing happiness of soul in this world, or which removes the fear of passing on to the next."

Oldfield concluded that a "wider conception of God" was needed. He is listed in A Biographical Dictionary of Modern Rationalists as a theist with mystic ideas about the soul. He was a proponent of evolution conceived as based on cooperation rather than competition.

Oldfield argued that meat was a main cause of disease. He was not a teetotaller, and promoted home-brewed ale. He argued that the vitamins in the barley of home-brewed ale were responsible for the stamina of the English people. In 1945, Oldfield commented that there "is no reason at all from the medical point of view" why a man should not get drunk once a month.

== Selected publications ==
- Tuberculosis: Or Flesh Eating a Cause of Consumption (1897)
- The Penalty of Death: Or, the Problem of Capital Punishment (1901)
- Essays of the Golden Age (1902)
- The Penny Guide to Fruitarian Diet and Cookery (1902)
- Myrrh and Amaranth (1905)
- The Value of Fruit as Food (1906)
- "Vegetarianism" . Encyclopædia Britannica. Vol. 27 (11th ed.). 1911.
- The Raisin Cure (1923)
- Fasting for Health and Life (1924)
- The Dry Diet Cure (1925)
- Get Well and Keep Well (1926)
- Eat and Get Well (1927)
- Eat and Keep Young (1928)
- Eat and Be Happy (1929)
- Healing and the Conquest of Pain (1944)
- The Mystery of Birth (1949)
- My Friend Gandhi (Reminiscences of Gandhiji, 1951)
- The Mystery of Death (1951)
- A Popular Guide to Fruitarian Diet and Cookery (1952)

== Quotes ==
Flesh is an unnatural food and, therefore, tends to create functional disturbance. As it is taken in modern civilization, it is affected with such terrible diseases (readily communicable to man), as cancer, consumption, fever, intestinal worms etc., to an enormous extent. There is little need to wonder that flesh-eating is one of the most serious causes of the diseases that carry off ninety-nine out of every hundred people that are born.

— Josiah Oldfield, in 1902

== Family ==
Oldfield married Gertrude Hick on 29 September 1899 at Wakefield Cathedral; she was the daughter of Matthew Bussey Hick of Wakefield, and sister of the doctor Henry Hick. They had twin daughters in 1902, but their marriage was not successful and they separated. He had two daughters named Josie: Josie Margaret Oldfield, with Irene Dorian Oldfield one of the twins; and Josie Magdalen Oldfield, born in 1906 and identified in the 1911 census. The latter, a cradle fruitarian, qualified in medicine in 1933.

== See also ==
- W. B. Shearn
