= Harvest Festival (United Kingdom) =

Seasonal holiday in Britain

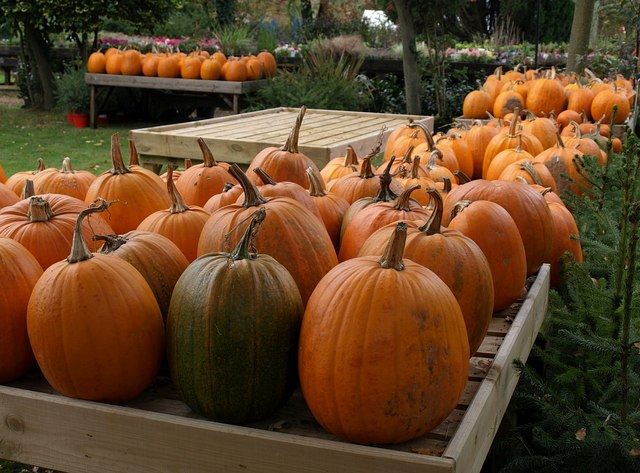
- Harvest pumpkins in Warwickshire.
- Also called: Harvest Thanksgiving, Harvest, Thanksgiving Day
- Observed by: United Kingdom
- Type: Cultural, religious.
- Date: The Sunday closest to the harvest moon
- Frequency: Annually
- Related to: Erntedankfest (Germany and Austria); Thanksgiving (Canada); Thanksgiving (United States)

The Harvest Festival is a celebration of the harvest and food grown on the land in the United Kingdom. It is about giving thanks for a successful crop yield over the year as winter starts to approach. The festival is also about giving thanks for all the good and positive things in people's lives, such as family and friendships. Harvest Festivals have traditionally been held in churches but also in schools and sometimes in pubs. Some estates and farms used to hold the harvest festival in a barn. In some towns and villages, the harvest festivals are set so that the different churches do not have it on the same day. People bring in produce from their garden, allotment or farm, and even tinned and packaged food. Often there is a Harvest Supper at which some of the produce may be eaten. Typically, surplus produce is given away to a local charity, hospital or children's home, or auctioned for charity.

== Date ==
Most churches, especially in rural areas, hold a Harvest Festival but the timing varies according to local tradition. Also, many church schools hold one mid-week. Harvest Festivals in the United Kingdom take place on different dates after the end of harvest, usually in September or October, depending on what crops are grown and when they are harvested locally. Unlike Thanksgiving in the US, the date has not been made an official public holiday. Though Harvest Thanksgiving Day itself is a Sunday, many parades, festivals and services occur on other days around the same date.

== See also ==
- Harvest Festival
- Thanksgiving
- Harvest
