= MB =

MB, Mb or M. B. may refer to:

== People ==
- Lee Myung-bak (born 1941), former president of South Korea
- Maurizio Bianchi (born 1955), Italian composer of industrial music
- Mario Balotelli (born 1990), Italian footballer
- Mahesh Babu (born 1975), an actor in Indian Telugu cinema

== Arts and media ==
- Manila Bulletin, a newspaper based in the Philippines
- Media Blasters, an American multimedia entertainment distributor
- Milton Bradley Company, a board-game and sometime video-game publisher
- Magandang Buhay, Philippine morning talk show
- MusicBrainz, an online open data music database
- Marching band, a type of musical ensemble

== Economics ==
- Mediobanca, an Italian company with Borsa Italiana stock symbol MB
- Multibanco, the Portuguese interbank network
- Monetary base – Measure of money supply

== Places ==
- Manitoba, province of Canada
- Monza and Brianza, Italy
- Myrtle Beach, South Carolina

== Transportation ==
- Mercedes-Benz, a German brand of automobiles, buses, coaches and trucks
- Willys MB, the WWII-era Jeep
- Marunouchi Line, a subway service operated by the Tokyo Metro

== Computing ==
- Megabyte (MB), a measure of information
- Megabit (Mb or Mbit), a measure of information
- MikroBitti (formerly MB), a Finnish computer magazine

== Biology and chemistry ==
- Mega base pairs, a unit of measurement in genetics
- moisture basis, a way to measure percentages of components in a chemical composition
- Myoglobin, a compound in blood
- 2-Methylbut-3-yn-2-ol, a reagent in organic synthesis
- Bachelor of Medicine, an academic degree (Medicinae Baccalaureus)

== Physical science ==
- Megabar (Mbar) and Millibar (mbar), a unit of pressure
- Body wave magnitude (m_{b}), a seismic scale
- Megabarn (Mb) and millibarn (mb), units of cross-sectional area
- Millibel (mB), a hundredth of a decibel (rarely used)

== Other uses ==
- mb (digraph), a combination of letters used in spelling
- Medal of Bravery (Canada), a military decoration
- Mälarhöjden/Bredäng Hockey, a Swedish ice hockey club
- Muslim Brotherhood, a pan-Islamic movement
