= Robert Semple (activist) =

Scottish poet and activist (1841–1920)

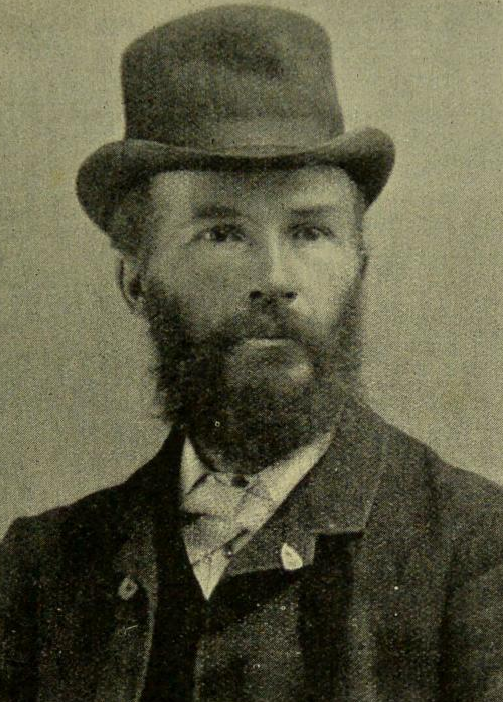
- Portrait from Fifty Years of Food Reform (1898)
- Born: 1841; Paisley, Scotland
- Died: 7 February 1920 (aged 1841); Belfast, Ireland
- Occupations: Poet; activist
- Organizations: Paisley Total Abstinence Society; International Organisation of Good Templars; Irish Temperance League; Hibernian Band of Hope Union; Irish Vegetarian Union; Order of the Golden Age; Belfast Vegetarian Society

Robert Semple (1841 – 7 February 1920) was a Scottish poet and temperance and vegetarian activist. He worked as a lecturer for temperance organisations in Scotland and Ireland, edited The Irish Templar, and served as president of the Irish Vegetarian Union.

== Biography ==
=== Early life and work ===
Semple was born in Paisley, Scotland, in 1841 to a textile family. He was the son of James Semple and Isabella Semple (née Smith). As a boy, he worked as an assistant to a handloom weaver. In 1861, he became a pattern designer, and in 1871 he was foreman of a winding department in a textile factory.

=== Temperance work ===
Semple became teetotal in 1869 and joined the International Organisation of Good Templars in 1870. During the 1870s, he lectured on temperance and was a member of the Paisley Total Abstinence Society. In 1881, he lectured in the Scottish Highlands.

In 1883, Semple moved to Belfast as a lecturer for the Irish Temperance League. He worked with the Hibernian Band of Hope Union in Dublin for several years and was elected grand secretary of the Good Templar Order of Ireland in 1893. He edited The Irish Templar.

Semple was also a poet. In 1884, he published a collection of temperance songs, Semple's Temperance Solos. His wife was also involved in the temperance movement; she died in 1902.

=== Vegetarianism ===
Semple became a vegetarian in 1880. He was president of the Irish Vegetarian Union from 1894 to 1897 and honorary secretary in 1901. He served on the General Council of the Order of the Golden Age in 1897.

At an Irish Vegetarian Union meeting in 1894, Semple spoke about five years he had spent in Australia. He said that Australians ate a large amount of meat and that animals there were abused, diseased and overworked before slaughter. He later argued that meat, eggs and seafood were unnecessary and too costly for ordinary households. He recommended a diet including grains, lentils, butterbeans, peas, vegetables, milk, nut margarine and tea.

Semple lectured for the Belfast Vegetarian Society and was its vice-president.

=== Death ===
Semple died at his residence on 7 February 1920 in Belfast, aged 79. An obituary in the Weekly Telegraph described him as a "staunch and faithful advocate" of temperance in Ireland.

== Selected publications ==
- Temperance Sketches in Prose and Verse (1879)
- Semple's Temperance Solos (1884)
