= James Christopher Street =

English Unitarian minister

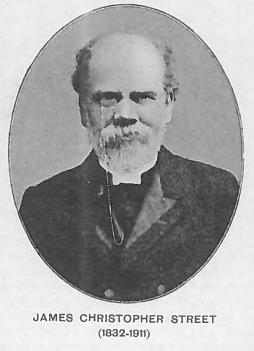
- Born: James Christopher Street; 1832; Nottingham
- Died: 1911 (aged 79); Shrewsbury
- Occupation: Minister

James Christopher Street (1832–1911) was an English Unitarian minister and vegetarianism activist.

== Career ==
Street was born in Nottingham. Street was superintendent missionary for the Manchester District Unitarian Association in 1858. He was minister at the Church of the Divine Unity at Newcastle from 1863 to 1870. Whilst in Newcastle he investigated the slums and delivered a lecture The Night Side of Newcastle in 1865.

He was minister at the All Souls' Church in Belfast from 1871 to 1889 and at the Church of the Saviour in Birmingham from 1891 to 1895. Street was the founder and secretary of the Ministerial Fellowship which was established in 1899. He retired in 1907 from failing health. He married several times.

Street died in Shrewsbury.

== Vegetarianism ==
Street became a vegetarian in the early 1890s for ethical reasons. He believed that animals were the creation of God and it was immoral for humans to take their lives. He was president of the Birmingham Vegetarian Society. In 1897, he was a speaker at the Vegetarian Society's fiftieth anniversary conference in Manchester.

Street was chairman of the Vegetarian Federal Union's 1895 autumn congress. He served on the General Council of the Order of the Golden Age in 1898. In 1907, he was a speaker at the 60th Anniversary of the Vegetarian Society in Manchester.

== Selected publications ==
- Unitarian Missionary Papers: Consisting of The Religious Condition of the People (with George Beaumont and William Binns, 1861)
- Winter Travels In Sunny Climes (1875)
