= Howard Williams (humanitarian) =

English writer and historian (1837–1931)

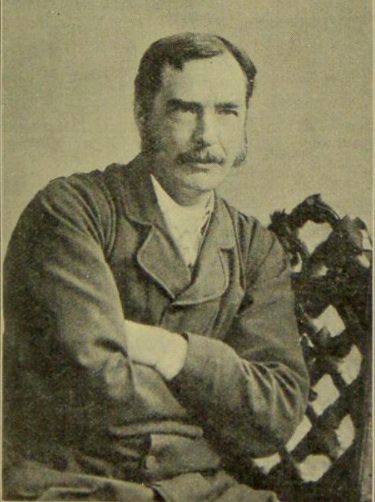
- Portrait from Fifty Years of Food Reform (1898)
- Born: 6 January 1837; Whatley, Mendip, England
- Died: 21 September 1931 (aged 94); Aspley Guise, England
- Education: St John's College, Cambridge (B.A., 1860; M.A., 1863)
- Occupations: Writer; historian; activist
- Years active: 1865–1907
- Known for: Humanitarianism, vegetarianism, and anti-vivisection activism; Co-founding the Humanitarian League (1891)
- Notable work: The Ethics of Diet (1883)
- Spouse: Eliza Smith (m. 1860; died 1906)
- Family: Henry John Williams (brother)

Howard Williams (6 January 1837 – 21 September 1931) was an English writer and historian. He was an advocate for humanitarianism, vegetarianism, and an opponent of vivisection. He is best known for The Ethics of Diet (1883), a historical survey of European vegetarianism that has been described as a classic of vegetarian literature and cited as an influence on the late Victorian vegetarian movement. Earlier he published The Superstitions of Witchcraft (1865), a study of the history and social effects of witchcraft beliefs. His other publications included a study of eighteenth-century letter writing centred on Jonathan Swift and Alexander Pope (1885), and a translation with notes of selected dialogues by Lucian (1887).

In 1891 Williams helped to found the Humanitarian League; he later wrote "Pioneers of humanity" for the league's journal, which was subsequently issued as a pamphlet. He served on the league's board, was a vice-president of the London Vegetarian Society and sat on the board of the Animal Defence and Anti-Vivisection Society.

== Biography ==
=== Early life and education ===
Williams was a born on 6 January 1837, in Whatley, Mendip, the fifth son of the Reverend Hamilton John Williams and Margaret Sophia. His older brother was the priest and Christian vegetarian activist Henry John Williams.

Williams was home educated by private tutors, before pursuing a degree in history at St John's College, Cambridge, where he earned a B.A. in 1860 and an M.A. in 1863. During his studies, Williams developed a close friendship with Professor Newman. Through this relationship, he cultivated a profound interest in humanitarian causes, a passion that persisted throughout his life.

=== Early career and scholarship ===
Williams considered a clerical career but did not enter Holy Orders. Instead, he worked as a private tutor for several years.

Williams published his first book, The Superstitions of Witchcraft, in 1865. It presents a continuous historical account of witchcraft belief, describing its wide reach across periods and social groups. It recounts the prosecutions associated with such beliefs, including torture, burnings, and executions, and argues that forms of the belief persisted in the nineteenth century in Europe and elsewhere.

=== Vegetarianism and anti-vivisection ===
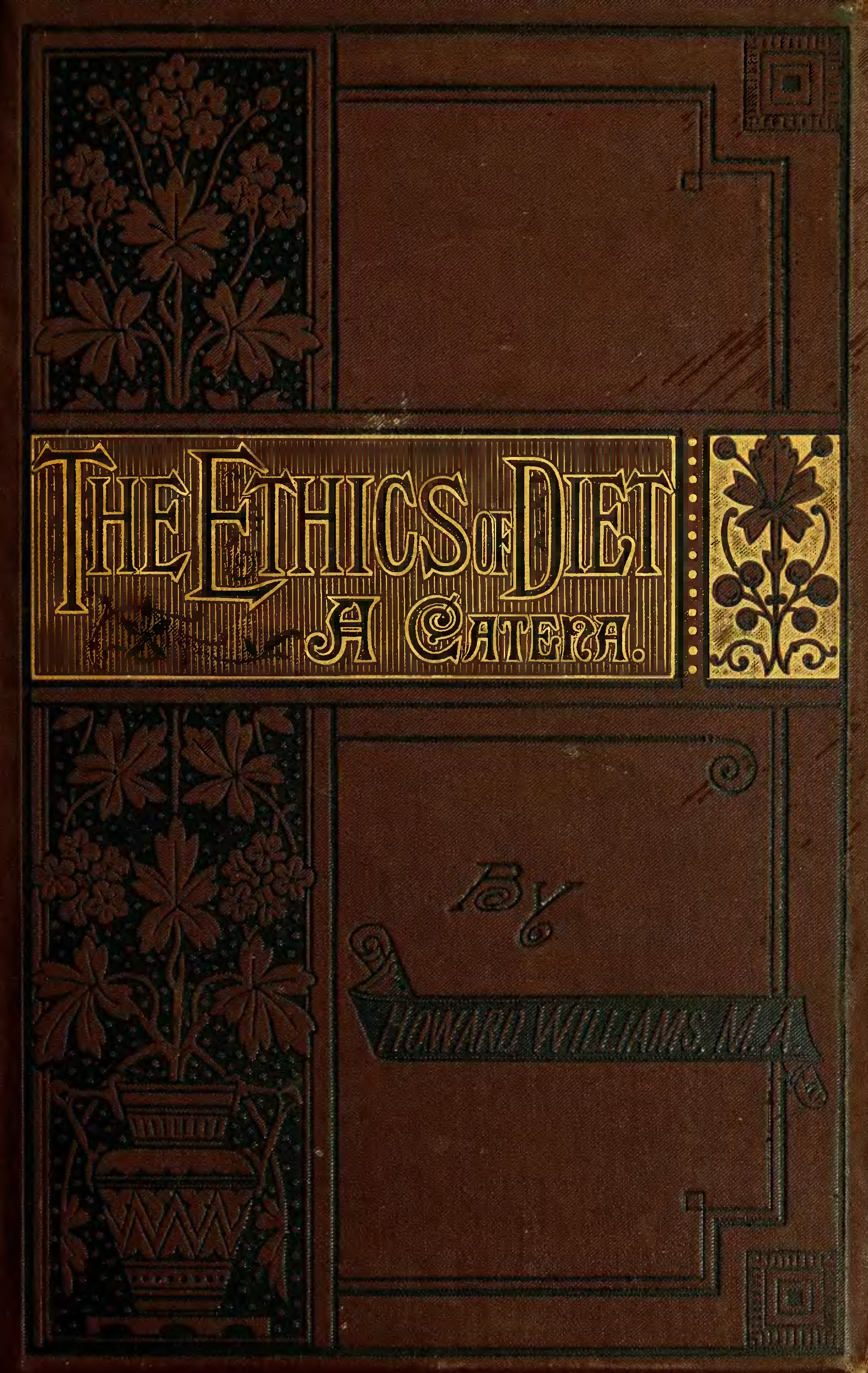
Cover of The Ethics of Diet (1883)

In 1872, Williams adopted vegetarianism and became an anti-vivisectionist. Writing in 1874, he described the "eating house" as an effective means of popularising vegetarian food, arguing that serving affordable, appealing pies and savouries would be more effective than urging people to adopt a vegetarian diet.

In 1883, Williams published The Ethics of Diet, a historical account of European vegetarianism; the book is considered to be a vegetarian classic, an authoritative text, and went through multiple editions. It has since been cited as a significant influence on the growth of the late Victorian vegetarian movement.

=== Later writing ===
In the 1880s, Williams expanded his academic endeavours to encompass a variety of topics. In 1885, he published a comprehensive study of the correspondence between Alexander Pope and Jonathan Swift, followed in 1887 by his translation of selected dialogues by Lucian.

=== Humanitarian League and affiliations ===
Williams was the inspiration for and one of the founding members of the Humanitarian League, in 1891, which "opposed all avoidable suffering on any sentient being". He remained on the board for several years and authored the "Pioneers of Humanity" for the league's journal, which was later published as a popular pamphlet. He also served as the Vice-President of the London Vegetarian Society and was a board member of the Animal Defence and Anti-Vivisection Society.

=== Personal life and death ===
Williams married Eliza Smith on 20 November 1860; she died around 1906.

In his later years, Williams chose a more secluded lifestyle, dedicating his time to gardening, tutoring, and canoeing from his home in Aspley Guise, near Woburn, Bedfordshire. He died there on 21 September 1931.

== See also ==
- European witchcraft § History
- History of vegetarianism

== Publications ==
- The Superstitions of Witchcraft (1865)
- The Ethics of Diet: A Catena of Authorities Deprecatory of the Practice of Flesh-eating (1883)
- English Letters and Letter Writers of the Eighteenth Century: Swift and Pope (with explanatory notes, 1886)
- Lucian's Dialogues, namely the Dialogues of the Gods, of the Sea-Gods, and of the Dead; Zeus the Tragedian, the Ferry-Boat etc. (translated with notes and a preliminary memoir, 1888)
- "Pioneers of Humanity" (The Humanitarian, 1907; later published as a pamphlet)
