= Walter Walsh (disambiguation) =

Walter Walsh (1907–2014) was an FBI agent and Olympic shooter.

Walter Walsh may also refer to:

- Walter Walsh (writer) (1847–1912), English Protestant author
- Walter Walsh (minister) (1857–1931), Scottish minister and peace advocate
- Walter Walsh (hurler) (born 1991), Kilkenny player
- Walter Walsh (courtier), courtier at the court of Henry VIII of England
- Walt Walsh (1897–1966), baseball player
