= Sickels =

Sickels is a surname. Notable people with the surname include:

- Carter Sickels (born 1970s), American author and educator
- Emma Cornelia Sickels, (1854–1921), American teacher
- Frederick Ellsworth Sickels (1819–1895), American inventor
- Garrett Sickels, American footballer
- John Sickels (b. 1968), American baseball writer
- Quentin Sickels, American footballer

== See also ==
- Sickles, a surname with alternative spelling

== See also ==
- Sickel
- Sickle (disambiguation)
