= Mary L. F. Ormsby =

American writer, editor, and educator (1845–1931)

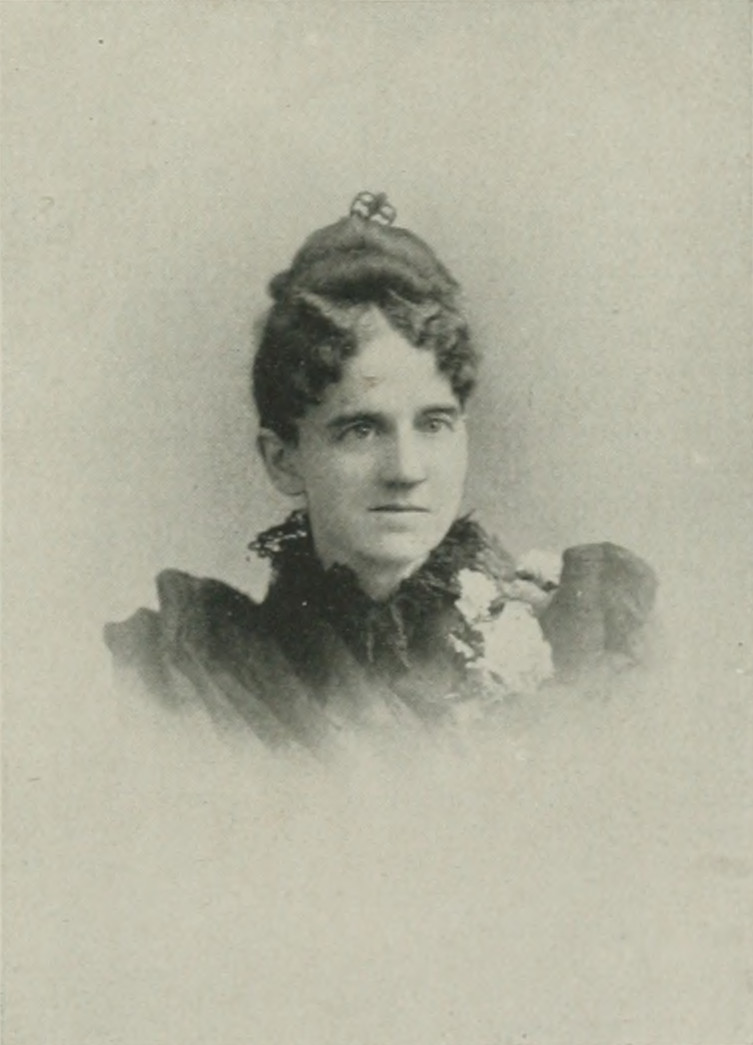
"A Woman of the Century"

Mary Louise Frost Ormsby (1845–1931), later Mary Frost Evans, was an American writer, editor, and educator involved in the peace movement.

== Early life ==
Mary Louise Frost was born in Albany, New York, the daughter of William Marsh Frost and Margaret Fulton Alcorn Frost. Her mother was born in Ireland. Her uncle Daniel M. Frost was a New York-born brigadier general in the Confederate States Army during the American Civil War; another uncle was New York politician Silas Wright. Mary Frost attended St. Mary's Hall in New Jersey, then Vassar College, graduating in the class of 1866.

== Career ==
Mary Frost and her widowed mother ran a school in New York, Seabury Seminary, as co-principals. After that, she became a writer. She belonged to Society of American Authors and was associate editor of the Peacemaker magazine, and the Rhode Islander newspaper (with her second husband, the paper's owner).

Mary L. F. Ormsby was a member of Sorosis, president of the Democratic Influence Club (1892–1893), president of the Women's International Peace Union, vice-president of the Universal Peace Union, and vice-president of the Woman's National Press Association. She was active with the Women's Christian Temperance Union and the Human Freedom League of the United States.

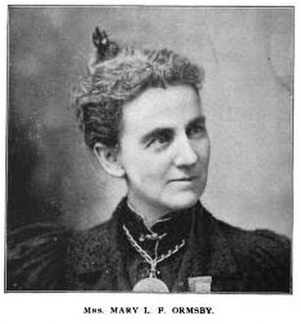
Mary L. F. Ormsby, in an 1896 publication.

Ormsby was a Universal Peace Union delegate to eight international gatherings of the peace movement, including the Universal Peace Congress in Rome (1891), Berne (1892), Chicago (1893), Antwerp (1894), and Luxembourg (1895). She was elected to the Italian Press Society after her work at the Rome conference. She spoke at the National Peace Congress in Washington, and served as secretary of the World's Federation of Young People. In 1899, she was president of the American Red Cross Women's Auxiliary in Providence, Rhode Island. By 1912, she and her second husband were living in Fort Collins, Colorado, still active in the peace movement.

Ormsby was at the center of several controversies. In 1892, President Grover Cleveland wrote to object to her naming a political club after his wife. Later that same year, she sued Victoria Woodhull and Tennessee Claflin, claiming that they owed her money. In 1893, she was involved in a public disagreement with other members of the New York peace community, prompting headlines such as "War Among Peacemakers" and "War for Peace Still On". "She seems to have identified herself with every known movement," said fellow peace activist Emma C. Sickels, "and carried consternation with her."

== Personal life ==
In 1875 Mary Frost married Rev. Duke C. Ormsby. She was widowed when he died. She remarried to Benjamin Franklin Evans by early 1898. She died in 1931, aged 86 years.
