= Maria Gray =

Maria Gray may refer to:

- Maria Emma Gray (1787–1876), English conchologist and algologist
- Maria Freeman Gray (1832–1915), American educator, feminist and socialist
