= Ida Whipple Benham =

American peace advocate

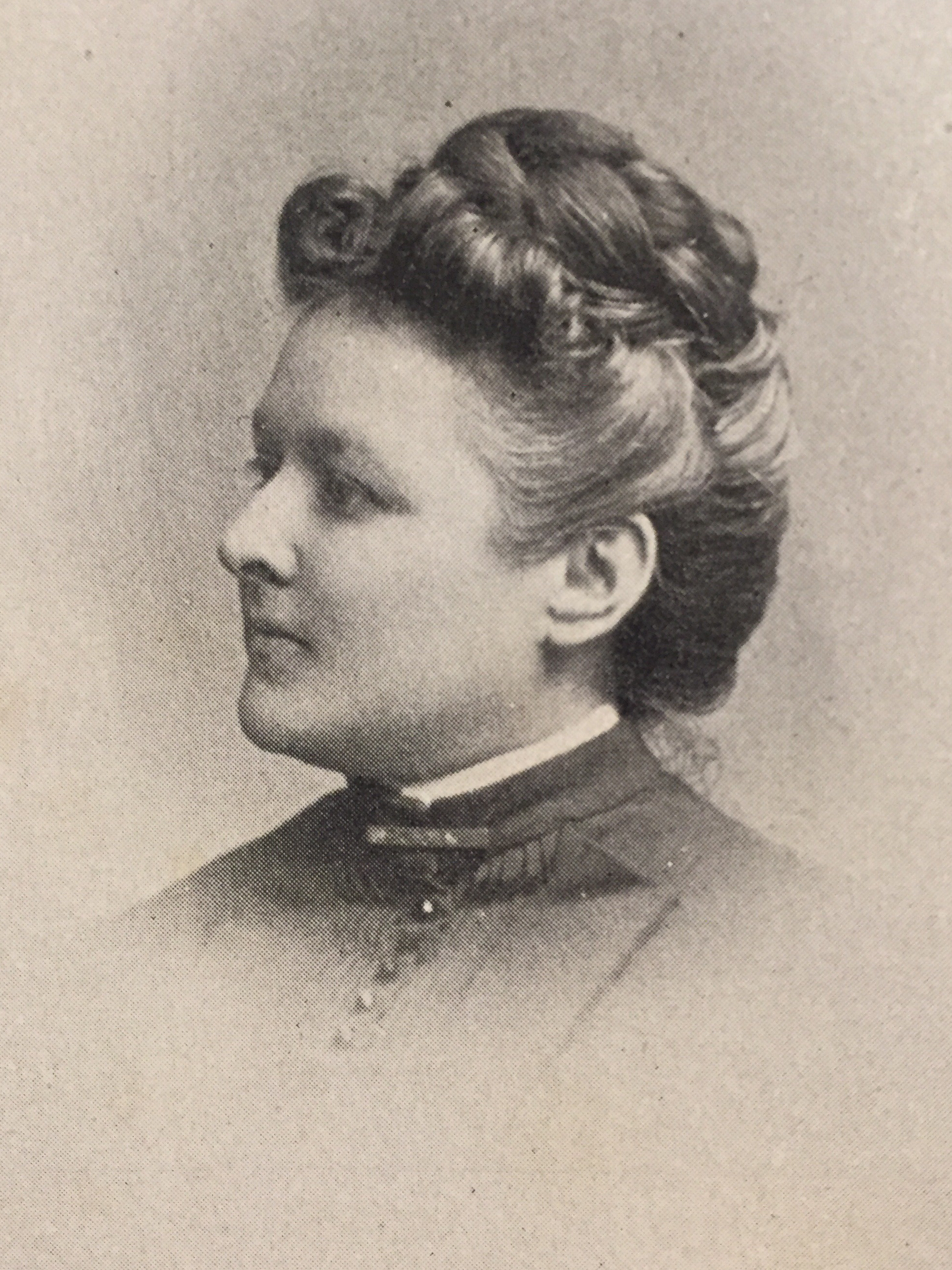
Ida Whipple Benham

Ida Whipple Benham (January 8, 1849 – May 21, 1903) was a peace advocate.

== Early life ==
Ida Whipple was born in a farmhouse in Ledyard, Connecticut, on January 8, 1849. She was the daughter of Timothy Whipple (1821-1892) and Lucy Ann Geer (1825-1884), and came from a Quaker family.

== Career ==
At an early age Ida Whipple Benham began to write verses. At the age of thirteen years she taught a country school.

She was made familiar with the reforms advocated by the Quakers, such as Temperance movement, anti-slavery, and the abolition of war. She lectured on peace and temperance. She was the director of the American Peace Society, and a member of the executive committee of the Universal Peace Union. She took a conspicuous part in the large peace conventions held annually in Mystic, Connecticut, and she held a monthly peace meeting in her own home in Mystic. She was the vice-president of the Connecticut Peace Society, founded by Jonathan Whipple, Zerah C. Whipple, Enoch Whipple, Timothy Whipple, Jeduthun Whipple, Julia Crouch Culver and Emeline Crouch, daughters of Zachariah Crouch, Jonathan Whipple Jr., and his daughter Content Whipple Waley.

She contributed poems to the New York Independent, the Chicago Advance, The Youth's Companion, St. Nicholas Magazine and other prominent periodicals.

In 1900 one of her poems, "I Wait For Thee," was set to music by C. B. Hawley.

== Personal life ==
Ida Whipple married on April 14, 1869, Elijah Bailey Benham, of Groton, Connecticut.

From 1886 to 1903 she lived at 7 Elm Street, Mystic, Connecticut. The house was built in 1866 for Rev. William H. Randall. It was a Greek Revival style. Randall was the grandson of Jedediah Randall, a wealthy Mystic merchant, and the son of William Pitt Randall, partner in a whaling firm and founder of the Reliance Machine Co.

She died on May 21, 1903, and is buried at Ledyard Union Cemetery, Ledyard, Connecticut.
