= League Against Cruel Sports =

UK animal welfare charity

- Formation: 1925; 101 years ago
- Founders: Ernest Bell, Henry B. Amos, and George Greenwood
- Type: Charity
- Registration no.: 1095234
- Legal status: Charity
- Purpose: Animal welfare
- Location: Godalming, United Kingdom
- Region served: United Kingdom
- President: Bill Oddie
- Chief Executive: Emma Slawinski
- Chair: Dave Fielding
- Website: league.org.uk
- Formerly called: League for the Prohibition of Cruel Sports

The League Against Cruel Sports, formerly known as the League for the Prohibition of Cruel Sports, is a UK-based animal welfare charity which campaigns to stop blood sports such as fox hunting, hare and deer hunting; game bird shooting; and animal fighting. The charity helped bring about the Hunting Act 2004 and Protection of Wild Mammals (Scotland) Act 2002, which banned hunting with hounds in England, Wales and Scotland.

== History ==
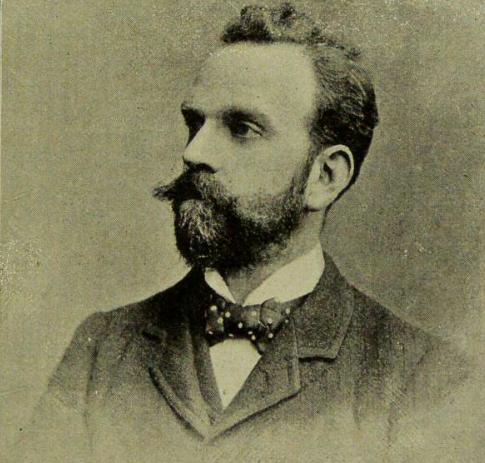
Ernest Bell, co-founder of the League

=== Early years ===
The League for the Prohibition of Cruel Sports was founded in 1925 by Ernest Bell and Henry B. Amos with George Greenwood as first president. (Note: Some modern sources incorrectly list the founding date as 1924 but their inaugural public meeting was held on 25 November 1925.) Their inaugural public meeting was held on 25 November 1925 at Church House, Westminster and was chaired by Greenwood, a council member of the RSPCA. The League opposed the suffering of any sentient animal, either directly or indirectly for the purpose of sport.

The League was founded due to frustration over the RSPCA's lack of "emphasis on the abolition of hunting or on Royalty to stop hunting". In 1927, the League's Advisory Committee included Henry S. Salt, Percy Scholes, several clergymen Frederic Donaldson, Robert Forman Horton, Walter Walsh and others. In 1929, Captain Edmund T. MacMichael commented that although the League condemns all forms of hunting they were primarily concerned with abolition of stag hunting and demanding the substitution of a drag in place of any living animal. The League's official journal Cruel Sports was published monthly. Hugh Walpole wrote an article in Cruel Sports describing his negative experience of fox hunting, "I have never in all my experience of war seen anything so terrified as that fox. I realised that morning I had seen a perfectly bestial thing... I don't believe the fox or the otter enjoys being hunted; I believe they experience fear, dismay, and pain".

In 1931, Ernest Bell and Stephen Coleridge resigned in protest over Henry Amos's continuous criticism of the RSPCA. Lady Cory who was also a member of the RSPCA resigned her presidency in 1932 as the League's journal had criticized other animal welfare societies and individuals. In 1932, a split-off organization, the National Society for the Abolition of Cruel Sports was formed by Ernest Bell and Stephen Coleridge following an internal dispute within the League over their relationship with the RSPCA.

The League for the Prohibition of Cruel Sports was renamed the League Against Cruel Sports in 1938.

=== Activism ===
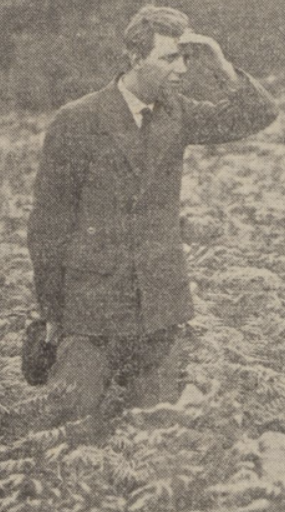
Edward Hemingway, chairman of the League for 23 years

In 1954, Joseph Sharp, secretary of the league advocated humane destruction of foxes by cyanide fumigation. In 1957, chairman Edward Hemingway proposed a Bill to be designed to give deer on Exmoor and Quantock Hills statutory protection which would bring an end to the "distressing scenes of the hunt".

It was reported in 1959 that members of the League were creating false chemical trails on Exmoor to confuse hounds when hunts take place. Edward Hemingway was using a "secret system" which was sent to him by a Scottish estate worker to confuse stag hunters from finding deer where they were expected. In 1959, Lord Grey De Ruthyn signed a letter of protest to Elizabeth II and Prince Philip, Duke of Edinburgh accusing Prince Philip of teaching Prince Charles to like blood sports.

In 1961, four League members who were opponents of fox hunting were expelled from the RSPCA. The RSPCA council unanimously decided that their conduct had been "prejudicial to the interests of the society". One of the members that had been excluded gained support from 274 RSPCA members that there should be a poll on fox hunting. Edward Hemingway stated that RSPCA's expulsion of the four members was "an insult to the whole animal welfare movement".

In 1962, the League sent members of the RSPCA 20,828 ballot papers on the issue of fox hunting. Nearly 8000 papers were returned. The result was 1291 for fox hunting and 6343 against. Edward Hemingway commented that the ballot was held at the request of the RSPCA members. The RSPCA responded by warning its members to ignore the ballot and stated that the ballot was not valid as it had not been authorized. The League's executive committee concluded "an inescapable conclusion which must be drawn from the result is that the RSPCA, as at present constituted, is not any longer a society for the prevention of cruelty to animals".

The League supported the Protection of Wild Mammals (Scotland) Act, passed in 2002 by the Scottish Parliament, and the Hunting Act 2004. The League has campaigned against commercial breeding of non-native game birds for shooting, and against hunts that it believes are continuing to hunt wild mammals contrary to the 2004 ban.

It also campaigns to extend hunting legislation from Scotland, England and Wales to Northern Ireland. Between 2006 and 2008, it successfully undertook private prosecutions against four hunt officials under the Hunting Act, because the police would not take action, and argued that this showed that the Hunting Act was clear in its meaning. The first prosecution led to a conviction, but this was overturned on appeal, and the second conviction was upheld in the Crown Court.

The League considers commercial greyhound racing to be cruel and inhumane. In 2014, the League published a report with GREY2K USA Worldwide on the state of greyhound racing in Great Britain.

In 2024, the League expressed concerns about fox hunters exploiting a loophole in The Hunting with Dogs (Scotland) Act 2023. The law introduced a licensing scheme which allows the use of more than two dogs in limited circumstances. The league noted that at least 41 licences were issued in the first hunting season since the act was introduced.

=== Presidents ===
Early presidents included Lady Cory, Alasdair Alpin MacGregor, Stephen Coleridge and Hamilton Fyfe. In 1947, Edith Sitwell was president of the League. Lord Grey de Ruthyn was president in the 1950s up until his death in 1963. In 1958, he announced his intention of speaking in the House of Lords to further the League's campaign against hunting. The Earl of Listowel was president from 1963 to 1967.

Donald Soper was president of the League from 1967 to 1997. Annette Crosbie was president from 2003 to 2006.

=== Wildlife reserves ===
In 1958, Edward Hemingway and Joseph Sharp purchased the freehold for Slowley Woods, near Luxborough which was the first League Against Cruel Sports sanctuary "for wild animals, particular those that are hunted". In 1988, it was reported that the League purchased 36 properties at a cost of 2.5 million to establish 2500 acres of wildlife. The League owns several wildlife reserves in and around Exmoor and Quantock Hills to prevent cruel sports from taking place.

In January 2026, volunteers from the League were being recruited to plant trees on their Exmoor wildlife reserve Baronsdown.

== Controversies ==
James Barrington a former Executive Director of the League Against Cruel Sports who later became a consultant to the Countryside Alliance has alleged that mismanagement by the League on Baronsdown reserve has caused large outbreaks of bovine tuberculosis in deer. He has criticised the League for its lack of wildlife management. The League has denied the allegation. John Bryant a former Press Officer and Wildlife Research Officer commented that James Barrington met with leading members of the hunting fraternity without the knowledge of the League's Executive Committee. After Barrington resigned from the League over a claim of constructive dismissal, he accepted a settlement of £20,000 and became pro-hunting.

In 2019, it was reported that saboteurs have refused to co-operate with the League after accusing them of using information they gained to promote themselves. Martin Sims, the League's Director of Investigations has been criticized by saboteurs for attending hunt fundraising events including a point to point race organized by the Cornwall Hunt Club. In response, a spokesperson for the League commented that Sims attended the races because his daughter is pursuing a career as a jockey and given the dangers he wanted to attend.

=== Political allegations ===
In 1983, Richard Course a former Executive Director of the League was quoted in The Times as pledging to give the Labour Party £100,000 for the general election. After Labour lost the election it is alleged that Richard Course had never intended to give the party the money. Course denied such allegations and stated they were being promoted by the British Field Sports Society to spread disinformation and the League has never given money to a political party. In 1986, Charles Nodder, Information Officer for the British Field Sports Society stated that Course had "misrepresented the facts" as in the annual report of the League for 1979 there is a statement which says "The League made a donation of £80,000 to the Labour party".

In May, 1983 a High Court Judge ruled that the Labour Party must repay 50,000 of the election gift from the League. The other £30,000 given by the League to publicize Labour's animal welfare policies need not be returned. Eric Heffer a vice-president of the League stated the situation was "regrettable" but the Labour party would obey the court's decision to repay £50,000 to the league.

In 1988, Richard Course resigned over a dispute with the committee. He alleged that donations from the League had been made to fund Labour candidates without knowledge of its members and that accounts had been faked to conceal transactions. He demanded a department of trade investigation into the League. The allegations were denied by Donald Soper.

In 2010, the League was censured by the Charity Commission for describing the Conservatives as the "nasty party". The commission said the League's claim, published in a press release, had contravened charity rules on party political neutrality. In a regulatory case report, the Commission stated that the "wording chosen by the charity was party political in character and went beyond the sort of statement that a charity can properly make". The League agreed to withdraw its press release.

In July 2024, it was reported that the police were investigating fraud allegations against the League. Andy Knott, the League's former chief executive, alleged that their fundraising appeals in the run-up to the 2024 United Kingdom general election were misleading. It was also reported that Knott was taking the League and Labour MP Dan Norris, the former chair, to an employment tribunal for unfair dismissal. Knott has alleged that the Labour Party was "interfering in the strategy and operations of the charity", with Knott claiming Norris personally put pressure on him to "keep quiet" if Labour dropped its commitment to close loopholes in existing fox-hunting laws. In response, a group of former League members, operating under the name Save the League, launched a campaign calling for Norris to resign as Chair. In September 2024, Surrey Police dropped its investigation into fraud allegations made against the League due to lack of evidence. A spokesperson for the League commented, "there was clearly no merit to the claims made against us".

Norris resigned as chairman in April 2025, following his arrest on suspicion of rape, child sex offences, child abduction and misconduct in a public office. In that same month, a case was initiated in the High Court against the League and Norris, in his role as chairman, by Knott for harassment and bullying. On 29 May 2025, the League agreed to pay Knott £29,505 for breach of contract as part of the ongoing employment tribunal proceedings.

=== Malpractice allegations ===
In 2015, it was claimed that whistleblowers’ concerns about alleged malpractice within the League were not investigated properly. Allegations made of bullying and sexist culture at the top of the organization were strongly denied by the League. John Cooper a barrister who had been president of the league since 2011 was removed from his position. Cooper commented that "my summary removal as president, without any prior warning, discussion or communication, is a direct result of my taking the decision to support vulnerable staff against management and trustees".

In 2018, Chris Williamson was suspended from the League and expelled from their board after he raised concerns about the actions of their senior management team. Williamson alleged that they asked a computer expert to hack the email account of Tim Bonner, chief executive of the Countryside Alliance. Seven trustees also resigned. The Charity Commission responded that they were investigating the allegations. The League denied all allegations and commented that they were "motivated purely by ex-trustees with a grudge". The League also stated that Williamson was expelled "after he supported someone who was abusing members of staff".

In 2018, Jordi Casamitjana alleged he was sacked by the League after disclosing it invested pension funds in firms involved in animal testing and that he was discriminated against because of his ethical vegan belief. The League stated that he was dismissed because of gross misconduct. Casamitjana took legal action against the League which ended in an out-of-court settlement in his favour. In 2020, the League commented, "Having revisited the issue we now accept that Mr Casamitjana did nothing wrong with such communications, which were motivated by his belief in ethical veganism. We are grateful to Mr Casamitjana for having raised the issue of pensions to us, which allowed us to change our default pension fund to an ethical one closer to our values."

Peter Egan and Penny Morgan, both vice-presidents of the League were sacked in 2018. It is alleged that Egan was removed for asking questions about the failures of the League which led to the Charity Commission using its statutory powers against it. Egan alleged he was forced out as he "wanted an open and transparent discussion". Morgan said she had been removed "for daring to ask some questions about what's going on in a wonderful animal charity that seems to be suffering upheavals".

== Timeline ==
- 1924 – The League was founded by Henry B. Amos to oppose rabbit coursing – he was successful in achieving a ban. This resulted in the organisation expanding its remit to include other blood sports – such as fox, hare and deer hunting.
- 1975 – A bill seeking to ban hare coursing, supported by the League, was passed through the House of Commons, but did not receive approval in the House of Lords.
- 1978 – The League secured legal protection for otters, including a ban on hunting them. The aquatic mammal was up until that point hunted with packs of hounds, one of the reasons for their numbers declining.
- 1992 – The League helped secure the Protection of Badgers Act, which expanded the protection of the mammals themselves to their setts. The homes of badgers are illegally targeted for several reasons, including being blocked by fox hunts to stop animals being pursued by hounds fleeing underground.
- 2002 – Fox, hare and deer hunting and hare coursing was banned in Scotland under the Protection of Wild Mammals (Scotland) Act 2002, which was introduced by MSPs following campaigning by the League and other animal protection organisations.
- 2004 – Fox, hare and deer hunting and hare coursing was banned in England and Wales under the Hunting Act 2004. The legislation was introduced by MPs following campaigning by the League and other animal protection organisations.
- 2005 – The Hunting Act 2004 came into force – making fox, hare and deer hunting and coursing illegal across England and Wales.
- 2005 – The Waterloo Cup hare coursing competition held its final meeting at Great Altcar in Lancashire, closing after 169 years following passage of the Hunting Act.
- 2006 – A huntsman with the Exmoor Foxhounds was found guilty of illegally hunting foxes with dogs in a private prosecution brought by LACS, but the case was overturned on appeal.
- 2007 – Two members of the Quantock Staghounds were successfully prosecuted by the League following chasing a deer across Exmoor.
- 2008 – Two members of the Minehead Harriers pleaded guilty to chasing a fox with a pack of hounds in a private prosecution by LACS.
- 2009 – The League announced a new campaign against dog fighting, amidst news reports that there is an increase in dog fighting in London.
- 2014 - The League celebrates 90 years of campaigning against cruelty to animals in the name of sport. Figures from the Ministry of Justice show that there have been 341 convictions under the Hunting Act 2004.
- 2015 – Prime Minister David Cameron offered a free-vote on repealing the Hunting Act, backing down shortly afterwards following pressure form the League, MPs and other animal protection organisations.
- 2015 – Cross-channel ferry companies stop shipping pheasants and partridges from French factory-farms to British shooting estates, following an investigation and lobbying by the League.
- 2018 – Conservative Party drops its manifesto commitment to offer a free-vote on repealing the Hunting Act following pressure from the League, meaning no Westminster party any longer supports repealing the hunting ban.
- 2018 – Scottish Government announces intention to strengthen the Protection of Wild Mammals (Scotland) Act 2002, which bans hunting with hounds in Scotland, following pressure from the League and other animal protection organisations.
- 2018 – Welsh Government bans pheasant and partridge shooting on public land following campaigning and pressure from the League and Animal Aid.
- 2018 – The Labour Party backs calls made by the League to strengthen the Hunting Act – including prison sentences for those who chase and kill wild mammals.
- 2019 – University of Wales suspends pheasant shooting on its countryside campus at Gregynog Hall following campaigning by the League.
- 2024 – The League welcomed the Labour Party's manifesto commitment to ban trail hunting.

== See also ==
- Anti-hunting
- List of animal welfare groups
