= Sickles =

Sickles may refer to:

== People ==
- Carlton R. Sickles (1921–2004), American lawyer and congressman from Maryland
- Daniel Sickles (1819–1914), American politician and Civil War general
- Mark D. Sickles (born 1957), American politician
- Nicholas Sickles (1801–1845), U.S. Representative from New York
- Noel Sickles (1910–1982), American commercial illustrator and cartoonist
- Robin Sickles, American economist
- Teresa Bagioli Sickles (1836–1867), wife of Daniel Sickles
- William Sickles (1844–1938), American Civil War soldier and Medal of Honor recipient

== Places in the United States ==
- Sickles, Oklahoma, an unincorporated community
- Sickles, an unincorporated community in Hamilton Township, Gratiot County, Michigan

== See also ==
- Sickels, another surname
- Sickle (disambiguation)
