= Sickle (disambiguation) =

A sickle is an agricultural tool.

Sickle may also refer to:

- Sickle Mountain, Antarctica
- Sickle Ridge, Antarctica
- Sickle Nunatak, Antarctica
- The Sickle, a name for part of the constellation Leo
- Sickle (horse), an English thoroughbred
- HMS Sickle, a Second World War Royal Navy submarine
- SS-25 Sickle, NATO reporting name for the RT-2PM Topol mobile intercontinental ballistic missile
- The sickle, a fictional currency unit and silver coin in the Harry Potter novels, see Fictional universe of Harry Potter#Economy

== See also ==
- Parapholis incurva, also known as sicklegrass, a species of grass
- Hammer and sickle, a symbol of communism
- Senna obtusifolia, also called sicklepod, a legume
- Dichrostachys cinerea, also known as sicklebush, a legume
- Sickel
- Sickles (disambiguation)
