= Universal Peace Union =

The Universal Peace Union was a pacifist organization founded by former members of the American Peace Society in Providence, Rhode Island with the adoption of its constitution on 16 May 1866; it was chartered in Philadelphia, Pennsylvania, on 9 April 1888. It ceased operations in 1913, shortly after the death of Alfred H. Love, who served as the organization's president from its founding. Other founders and officers included ministers and reformers Adin Ballou and Walter Walsh, American Red Cross founder Clara Barton, politician and author Belva Ann Lockwood, reformer Lucretia Mott, Nobel Peace Prize winner Frédéric Passy, editor Mary L. F. Ormsby, and politician and educator John Wesley Hoyt. Ella B. Ensor Wilson served as president of the Wilsonton (Kansas) branch of the UPU.

The UPU's motto was: "Remove the causes and abolish the custom of war, establish and live the principles of peace."

On a hill overlooking the Mystic River near Mystic, Connecticut, the UPU owned a grove and built a "Peace Temple" that could seat 1,000 people for annual summer gatherings that attracted such noted speakers as William Lloyd Garrison and Julia Ward Howe. The grove eventually was mortgaged to pay for UPU programs and publications and then sold in 1914 to Mary Jobe Akeley. The property is now maintained as the Peace Sanctuary nature preserve, open daily from dawn to dusk.

Records of the UPU, including correspondence, minutes, financial records, publications, and memorabilia, are housed at the Swarthmore College Peace Collection.

== Notable people ==
- Adin Ballou
- Clara Barton
- Ida Whipple Benham
- Amanda Deyo
- Maria Freeman Gray
- John Wesley Hoyt
- Belva Ann Lockwood
- Alfred H. Love
- Clemence Sophia Harned Lozier
- Marguerite Moore
- Lucretia Mott
- Mary L. F. Ormsby
- Frédéric Passy
- Ruth Hinshaw Spray
- Walter Walsh
- Zerah C. Whipple
- Anna White
