= Amanda Deyo =

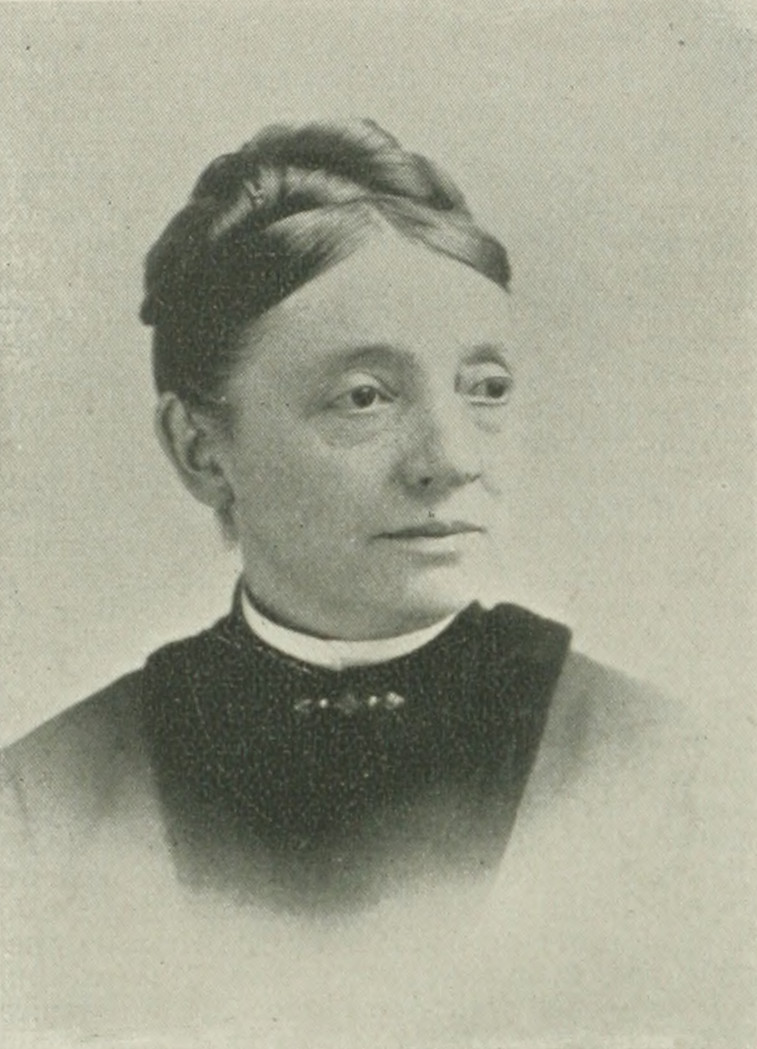
Amanda Deyo

Amanda Deyo (October 24, 1838 – November 1, 1917) was an American Universalist minister, pacifist, and correspondent. She was also a founder of women's right societies.

== Early years and education ==
Julia Amanda Halstead was born in Clinton, Dutchess County, New York, October 24, 1838. She was reared in the Society of Quakers, and for many years, she was an active participant in their meetings. At the age of fifteen, she became a school teacher. After teaching for some time, she attended the Poughkeepsie, New York, Collegiate Institute, from which she was graduated in 1857.

== Career ==
In 1857, she married Charles B. Deyo, a farmer of Huguenot descent. He aided his wife in her efforts for the improvement of humanity. Their family consists of two daughters. Deyo was present at one of the early anniversaries of the Universal Peace Union in New York City, where she met Lucretia Mott, Alfred H. Love, and others of the friends of peace. There, she made her mark as an advocate of the doctrines of that organization, and thereafter, she was an active supporter of the cause. She attended all the peace anniversaries throughout the United States, traveled extensively, spoke often and organized numerous peace societies.

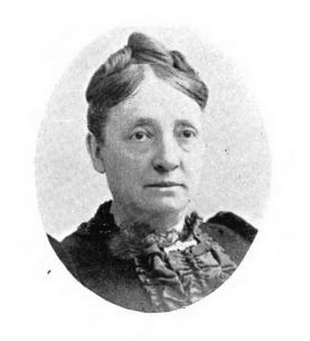
Amanda Deyo

Deyo became an ordained minister in the Universalist church in 1885. In 1888, she was called to the pastorate of the Universalist Church in Oxford, New York, having previously served as pastor of the Universalist Church in Poughkeepsie. She was later the pastor of All Souls Universalist Church in Scranton, Pennsylvania, and by 1893, she was unanimously chosen to be the minister of the Universalist Church in San Diego, California. She was so closely identified with the organizations devoted to the abolition of war that she was called the "Peacemaker."

Deyo was one of the delegates of the Universal Peace Union to the International Peace Congress and the Exposition Universelle of 1889, and did some effective work in the peace cause. Her address to the congress was printed and distributed at the Exposition. She was also present and presented a paper in the Woman's Rights Congress in Paris. She represented the union in the Woman's Council held in Washington, D. C. in March, 1888, and signalized the occasion by calling a grand peace meeting in the Church of Our Father, where many prominent women made addresses. In addition to her work in the ministry, preaching three times each Sunfsy and attending funerals and weddings, she was an active worker in the temperance and prohibition cause, and at one time, traveled and lectured for that interest and organized its work. However, her greatest efforts were made towards substituting peace for war and harmonizing the difficulties constantly arising in families, neighborhoods and churches. By her efforts and those of her husband, the Dutchess County Peace Society, one of the large and flourishing branches of the Universal Peace Union, was organized in 1875 and kept active by them until her ministerial duties made it necessary to turn over the work to others.

== Personal life ==
After Deyo retired, she returned to the Quaker faith. She died November 1, 1917, in Glen Cove, New York.

== See also ==
- List of peace activists
