= Edward Hemingway =

British journalist and animal welfare activist

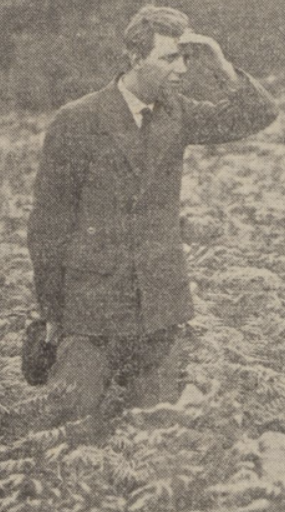
- Born: Edward Alexander Hemingway; 29 April 1902
- Died: 2 May 1963 (aged 61); Minehead
- Occupation: Journalist
- Spouse: Catherine Freda Firminger (m. 1946)

Edward Alexander Hemingway (29 April 1902 – 2 May 1963) was a British journalist, animal welfare activist and opponent of hunting.

== Biography ==
Hemingway lived at Windsor as a young boy where he became attached to deer. His uncle was the headmaster of the Royal School within the grounds of Windsor and he lived with him for a while. He worked as a local councillor in Minehead and as a freelance journalist. In 1936, he established a naturist club, the North Devon Club of Beaworthy. It is considered to be one of the oldest nudist colonies in England.

Hemingway lived at Sandymount, The Ball in Minehead. He was chairman of the Urban Council's Finance and Staff Committees. He suffered from a weak heart. In 1944, he was fined £20 by a National Service officer for refusing a medical examination. He married Catherine Freda Firminger in 1946. They had one daughter Kathleen Margaret Hemingway. Hemingway's cousin was the American writer Ernest Hemingway.

=== League Against Cruel Sports ===
Hemingway was chairman of the League Against Cruel Sports for 23 years. He was the editor of the League's journal. In 1958, Hemingway and Joseph Sharp secretary of the League purchased the freehold for Slowley Woods, near Luxborough which was the first League Against Cruel Sports sanctuary "for wild animals, particular those that are hunted". In total, he stated that the League had purchased around 200 acres of land on Exmoor near Dunster to stop hunting.

In 1959, it was reported that Hemingway and the League were using a "secret system" which was sent to him by a Scottish estate worker to confuse stag hunters from finding deer where they were expected. Hemingway blamed royal patronage for allowing hunting to remain legal. In 1961, he criticized Prince Philip for attending a tiger shoot in India.

=== National Abolition of Deer Hunting Committee ===
Hemingway was chairman of the National Abolition of Deer Hunting Committee. In August 1957, the Committee employed a retired undercover detective inspector to follow various deer hunts in the west of England. He used a tape-recorder and camera to obtain evidence. Hemingway commented that "the records of his investigation portray scenes more reminiscent of a lynching than the end of a well-conducted sport". The report alleged that a stag was cut open and the liver and kidney were sliced and given to young children riders to be "blooded" and that stags were being knifed below the heart and cut open to remove the liver which was given to local people. The report was planned to be published as a booklet and given to MPs on the day of the Protection of Deer Bill's second reading in 1958.

In 1959, the Committee released a 25 minute film on deer hunting. The film took two years to produce and included footage of hunting scenes, including the chase, kill and cutting of dead deer. Frederick Messer performed the commentary. It was shown to MPs in the House of Commons in June 1959 by Messer to support the Protection of Deer Bill. Joseph Sharp was the secretary of the Committee.

== Assault allegations ==
In 1927, it was alleged that Ernest C. Rawle a farmer from Bossington assaulted Hemingway in a refreshment tent at Stoke Pero Races by holding his throat and pushing him to the ground. Rawle is alleged to have targeted Hemingway over his anti-hunting views. Rawle stated that he did argue with Hemingway but denied catching him by the throat. The bench concluded that a technical assault had been committed and Rawle was bound over for six months for a sum of £5.

In 1928, Hemingway visited the Metropole Hotel in Minehead to photograph a polo event for a newspaper. He was alleged to have been the victim of an assault from several army officers who dragged him from the hotel and threw him into the sea. It was alleged that the officers were aware of Hemingway's anti-stag hunting views which they disagreed with. The defendants admitted to throwing Hemingway into the sea but the charge of assault was dismissed as there was lack of evidence for maliciously causing grievous bodily harm or "intent to disable". The evidence of identification was also considered non-satisfactory. The defendants thanked Hemingway for asking the court to withdraw the case, apologized for their poor conduct and offered to pay his costs and expenses.

== Death ==
Hemingway collapsed at a League Against Cruel Sports conference in London in 1963. He died at his home in Minehead, aged 61.
