= Ella B. Ensor Wilson =

American social reformer and writer

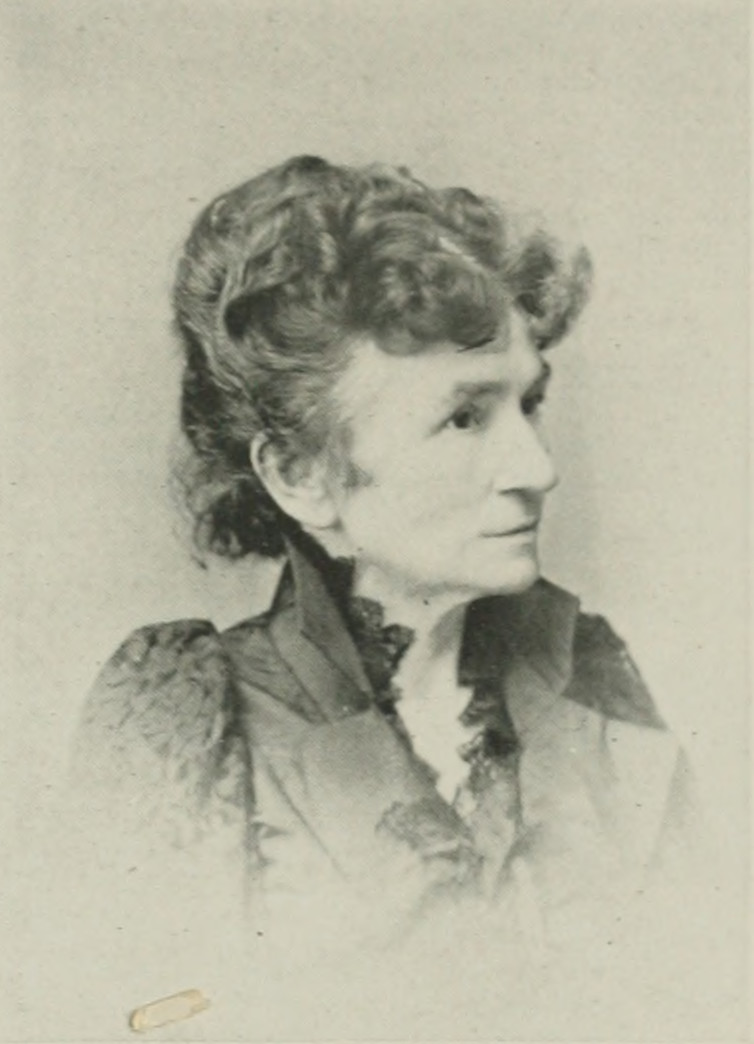
- "A Woman of the Century"
- Born: Eleanor Benson Ensor; 1838; Ensor Manor, Baltimore County, Maryland, U.S.
- Died: September 11, 1913 (aged 74–75)
- Other name: Ella
- Occupations: social reformer; writer
- Spouse: Augustus Wilson (m. 1863; died 1885)

Signature
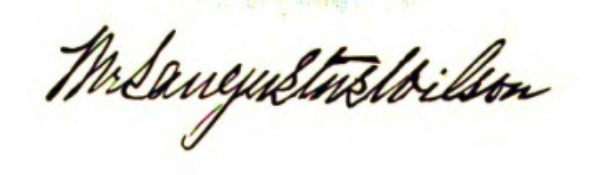

Ella B. Ensor Wilson (née, Ensor; also known as, Mrs. Augustus Wilson; 1838 – September 11, 1913) was an American social reformer and writer of the long nineteenth century associated with the women's suffrage and temperance movements. She was a strong advocate of "equal rights" and although her birthplace was in Maryland, a slave State, and having been reared and educated under that influence, she was always opposed to slavery. Wilson supported women's causes with her influence and money.

== Early life ==
Eleanor (nickname, "Ella") Benson Ensor was born in Ensor Manor, Baltimore County, Maryland, 1838. She was the daughter of Gen. John S. Ensor and his wife Elizabeth. Her father had been largely interested in the pursuits of agriculture, legal and educational interest, but retired from business several years before his death, February 7, 1866, while his widow died in 1867.

There were eight children in the family, five sons and three daughters, including: James B. Ensor, John T. Ensor, Zadoc Ensor, and Laura Ensor Baker. Wilson was the eldest daughter and the fourth child of eight.

== Career ==
=== Maryland ===
Immediately after having finished her education, she wrote a book on the history of trees, plants and flowers, with the language and sentiment in poetry. Wilson served as her father's private secretary during the Civil War.

=== Ohio ===
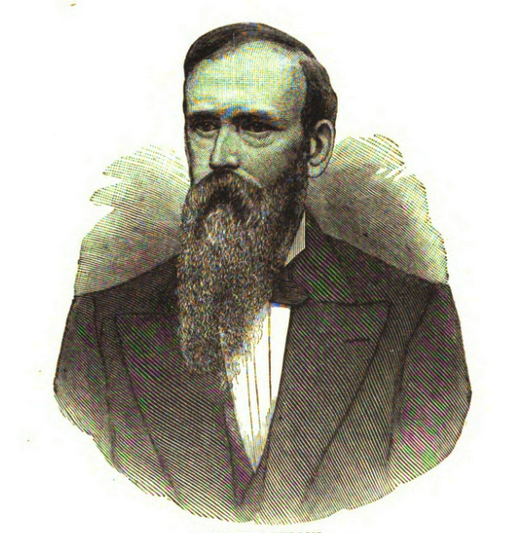
Augustus Wilson

On December 1, 1863, she married Augustus Wilson (born 1836), of Ohio, in which State they settled, after traveling extensively in the U.S. and British America.

She was long identified with the woman suffrage movement, and in 1870, she was elected president of an association. She attended many State and national conventions of the woman suffragists.

In Ohio, she was active in temperance work, and was a member of the Good Templars in that state, where her influence and work were acknowledged.

=== Kansas ===
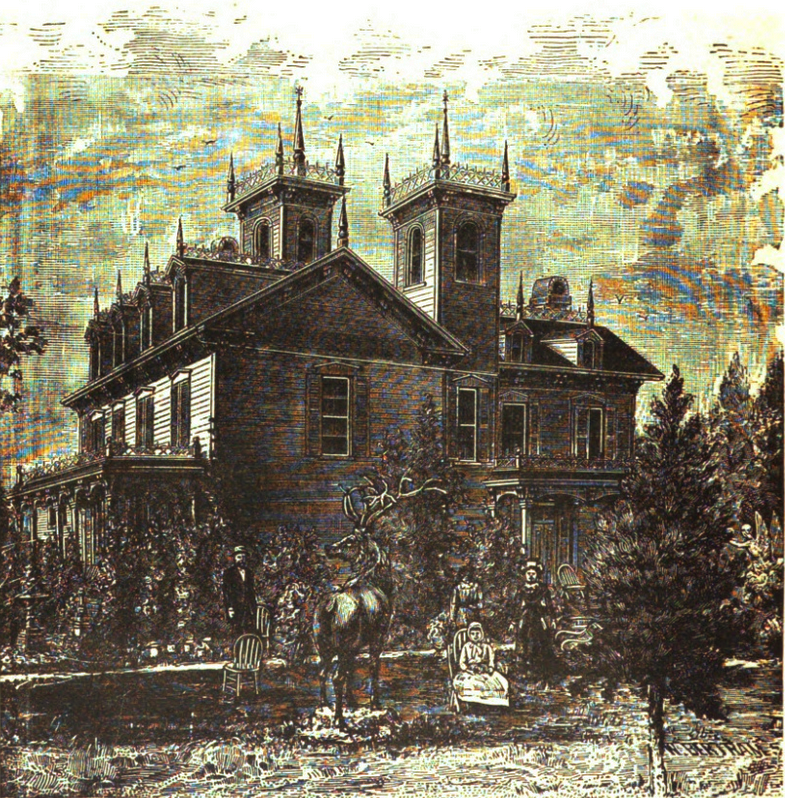
Wilson residence in Parsons, Kansas

In 1874, the Wilsons removed to Parsons, Kansas, where Mr. Wilson engaged in business. She was an efficient worker in the "Murphy movement", being secretary of the Murphy organization in Parsons. She was also a contributor to the only representative temperance journal of the Southwest. In 1879, she was made a life member of the Kansas temperance union. In 1880, she was elected president of the congressional work of the Woman's Christian Temperance Union in Kansas. In July, 1881, she was a delegate to the national prohibition convention, held in Chicago.

At the age of 15, she became a life member of the American Missionary Society in which she was an active participant both in works that pertained to home and foreign interests. She was a liberal contributor to the Woman's Board of Foreign Missions in cooperation with the American Board of Commissioners for Foreign Missions. In 1875, she assisted in raising money to found the mission home in Constantinople, Turkey.

In 1881, she memorialized both houses of Congress to secure homes in Oklahoma for the Exodusters. She served in many public enterprises, such as the Bartholdi monument fund, the relief association for drouth-smitten farmers in Kansas, and the New Orleans expositions. She was a trustee of the State Art Association of Kansas, a member of the Kansas Historical Society, and of a score of other important organizations.

By request of President Chester A. Arthur, Governor George Washington Glick, of Kansas appointed Wilson to be Lady Commissioner to the Industrial Cotton Centennial Exposition at New Orleans in 1883, where she achieved national distinction and honor for her state and herself.

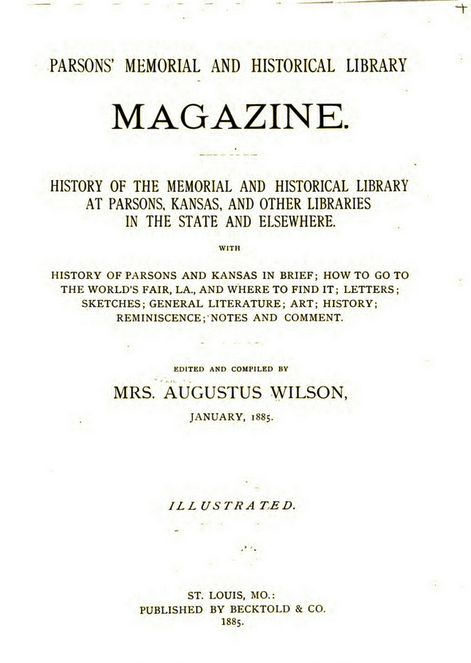
Parsons' Memorial and Historical Library Magazine

She aided in founding the Parsons Memorial and Historical Library. Wilson was the leader in the movement to establish the library. She personally solicited money, books, lumber and merchandise from corporations, societies and merchants in the Eastern U.S., and from the citizens of the state generally, and liberally gave her time to the project. To celebrate the opening of the library, Wilson edited a volume of 400 pages with the title: Parsons Memorial and Historical Library Magazine. It contained an account of the library and the citizens who assisted in its establishment. Published in January 1885, the volume was well illustrated and bound in brown cloth.

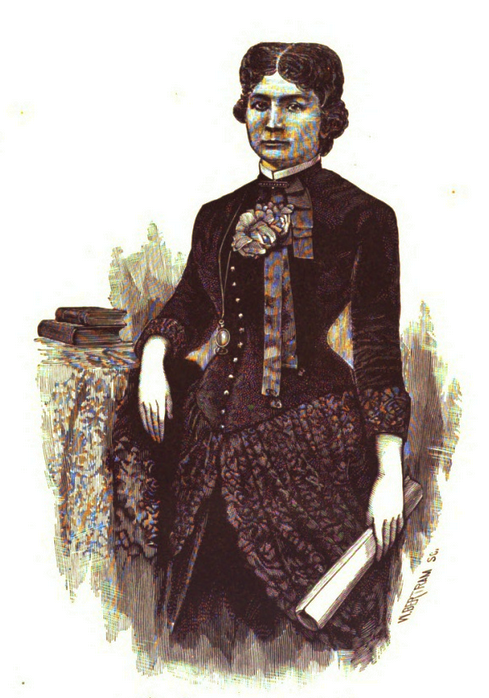
1885

After her husband's death in Parsons in 1885, the widow moved to her farm at Wilsonton, Kansas. She erected a large house, built in plain view of the trains passing on the Katy. In her home, she had what was considered one of the finest private libraries in the state. Her walls were covered with the choicest paintings and works of art, while every available space was filled with statuary of the old masters and patriots of the world.

In 1888, she established the Wilsonton Journal, of which she was editor and proprietor, having one of the finest press buildings in the state, also erected by herself. For years, she published the Wilsonton Journal at irregular intervals. It was generally believed she printed this for the transportation she received from the railroads, for railroads were always a favorite pastime for her. She persuaded the Katy to make Wilsonton a whistling station. After the anti-pass law went into effect, she had no further object in printing her paper and suspended its publication. During the last few years of its publication, Wilson did not send her paper through the mails, but brought it to Parsons and handed it to those who would take it, often getting a dollar or two from some merchant of former friend for a "write up", which perhaps did not appear until months later, when she was able to get out an issue of the paper.

Wilson was a member of the press committee and the Kansas representative in the World's Columbian Exposition of 1893. She was a contributor in poetry and prose to various periodicals of the U.S.

Pursuant to a call for a public meeting on December 1, 1898, Wilson organized at her Wilsonton residence, in Wilson chapel, a branch of the Universal Peace Union (UPU) by request of President Alfred H. Love, of the Universal Peace Union, and his executive committee. Wilson, having been called to the chair, stated the object of the meeting after which she invited Rev. Samuel Carson to open the exercises with prayer. Wilson was elected as president of the Wilsonton UPU by a unanimous vote.

== Personal life ==
The Wilson's only child, John Emory (1868–1869), died while the family was living in New Madison, Ohio. They had an adopted daughter, Ella Wilson Baker, the youngest child of Mrs. Laura Ensor Baker, the youngest sister of Mrs. Wilson.

She was a trustee of the State Art association, of Kansas; an honorary member of the State Historical society; a member of the Social Science club, of Kansas and Missouri, and of the Kansas Woman's Press association. She served as president of the Spanish Study club, Wilsonton, the Woman's Mutual Improvement association, and the Labette County Columbian Exposition association. She was a member and director of the National Art Association; vice-president and press representative of the Queen Isabella association, of Kansas; and Kansas representative for the National Press league. She was appointed by Hon. C.C. Bonney, president of the World's Columbian Exposition congress, as honorary and corresponding member of the woman's branch of the World's Congress Auxiliary, July 22, 1891. She was appointed a member of the Press Congress, May 1892.

Wilson had been a member of the Congregational Church. Later in life, she became a Spiritualist in belief and at her Wilsonton farm, she had a small chapel where at times, she held service.

In March 1912, Probate Judge Thompson came from Oswego, Kansas, and with Drs. Vaughan and Bennett, went to Wilsonton to conduct a lunacy inquiry in the case of Wilson. They declared her to be insane and the Judge ordered that she be taken to the state hospital at Osawatomie, Kansas. But the state officials there would not admit her, owing to her age, and she was taken to Bartlesville, Oklahoma, where her family members lived and who were willing to take charge of and care for her. In August 1912, Samuel Carson, guardian of the person and estate of Wilson, was given authority to sell certain property of said estate, the money received for same to be used for her support. In October of that year, the sale of real estate of the estate of Wilson was approved and Elizabeth Ensor was engaged to care for Wilson.

While Wilson was under the care of a relative at Bartlesville, she wandered away and relatives were no longer able to care for her. She held the illusion that she was still wealthy and was promoting a world's fair. On May 26, 1913, she was taken to the state asylum for the insane at Osawatomie. Ella B. Ensor Wilson died September 11, 1913. According to Rev. Samuel Carson, Wilson's guardian, her entire estate was used in the care of her before her death.

== Selected works ==
- History of the Cattle Trade of the United States
- History of National Cattle Conventions
- Parsons Memorial and Historical Library Magazine, 1885
