= Sickel =

Sickel is a surname. Notable people with the surname include:

- Dale Van Sickel (1907–1977), All-American college football player and motion picture stunt performer
- Horatio G. Sickel (1817-1890), Union general during the American Civil War
- Theodor von Sickel (1826-1908), German-Austrian historian

== See also ==
- Sickels
