= GREY2K USA Worldwide =

American political lobbying organization

- Founded: 2001
- Founder: Christine Dorchak, Carey Theil
- Type: 501(c)(4) non-profit organization
- Purpose: Humane treatment of animals
- Location: Arlington, MA
- Key people: Christine Dorchak, President and General Counsel
- Revenue: $394,595 (2012)
- Employees: 5 (2012)
- Website: grey2kusa.org

GREY2K USA Worldwide is an American non-profit political lobbying organization dedicated to passing stronger greyhound protection laws and ending dog racing. It was founded in March 2001 as Grey2K and changed its name in 2013 to reflect an international focus.

GREY2K USA was influential in a 2008 local Massachusetts ballot that prohibited greyhound racing in the state. Afterwards, the organization began similar campaigns against greyhound racing internationally. The same year, the organization moved from Somerville to larger offices in Arlington. New Hampshire, Rhode Island and other states made similar prohibitions. According to GREY2K USA, there were 49 greyhound tracks when the organization was founded in 2001 and 21 twelve years later.

GREY2K USA is funded by private donors and has an annual budget of about $400,000.

== Reports ==
GREY2K USA created a report about greyhound racing in West Virginia in 2013, which found that over five and a half years, there were 4,796 injuries at local greyhound tracks and 289 deaths.
