= Walter Walsh (writer) =

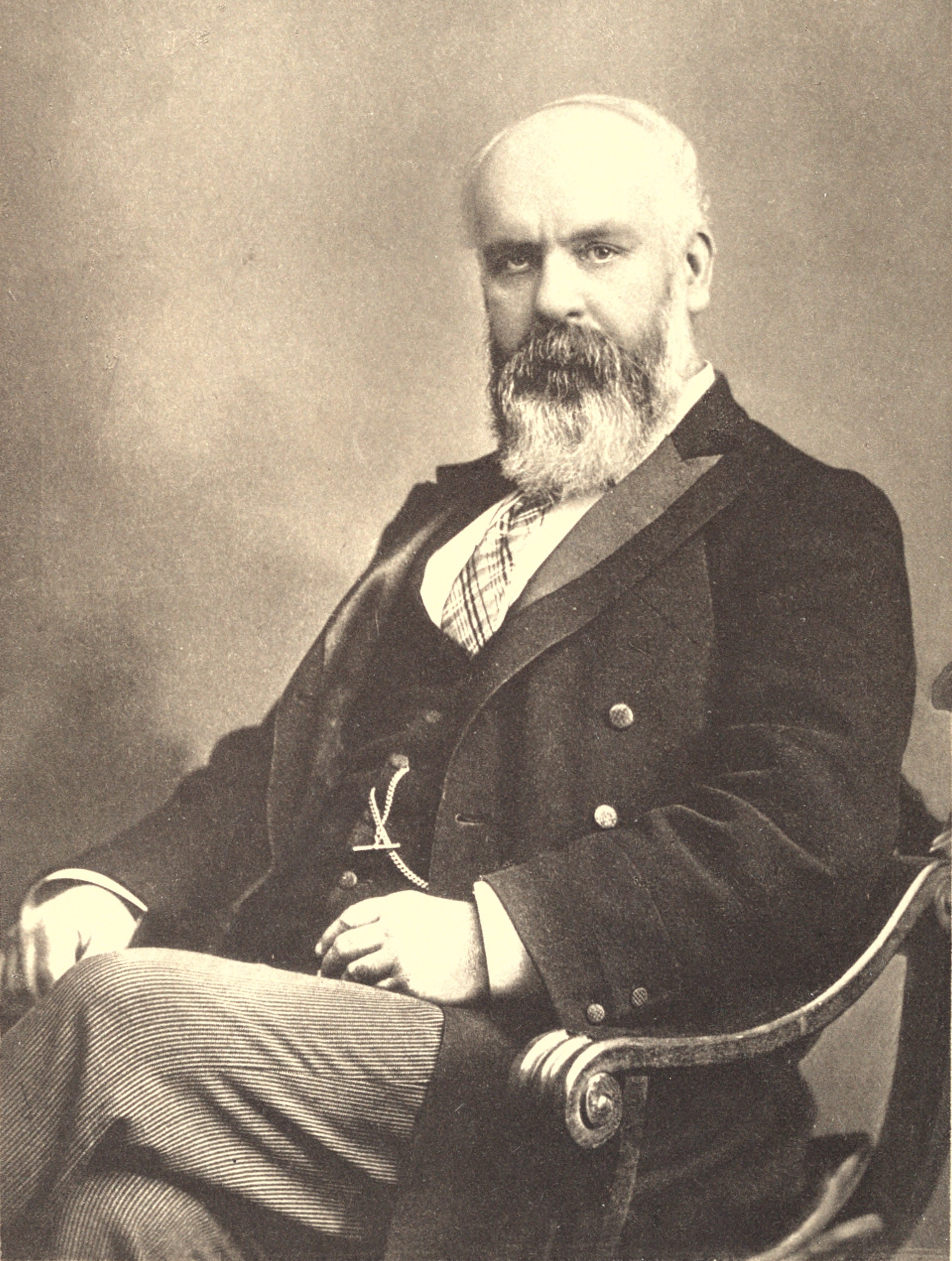
- Born: 23 January 1847; Folkestone, Kent, England
- Died: 25 February 1912 (aged 65); Spring Grove, London, England
- Occupation: Author
- Spouse(s): Elizabeth Adams (1874–1912; his death); 4 children

Walter Walsh (23 January 1847 – 25 February 1912) was an English Protestant author and journalist. He is best known for his work The Secret History of the Oxford Movement, first published in London by Swan Sonnenschein in 1897, which ran through several editions and remains in print in the 21st century. The success of the book, a critique of the Oxford Movement, led to him becoming a Fellow of the Royal Historical Society.

Walsh was a founding member of the Imperial Protestant Federation in 1896. He also wrote for the English Churchman and the Protestant Observer. In 1905 he founded the journal Grievances in Ireland.

Walsh, a lay Anglican, is sometimes confused with his Scottish contemporary, the Rev. Dr. Walter Walsh (1857–1931), a minister and peace advocate; the two men do not appear to have been related.

== Bibliography ==
- The Secret History of the Oxford Movement (1897)
- The History of the Romeward Movement in the Church of England, 1833–1864 (1900)
- The Religious Life and Influence of Queen Victoria (1902)
- The Jesuits in Great Britain: an Historical Inquiry into their Political Influence (1903)
- The Women Martyrs of the Reformation (1905)
- England's Fight with the Papacy: a Political History (1912)
