= Walter Walsh (minister) =

Scottish religious leader and peace activist (1857–1931)

Rev. Dr. Walter Walsh
- Born: 13 April 1857; Dundee, Scotland
- Died: 20 May 1931 (aged 74); London, England
- Education: Glasgow University; D.D., Pittsburgh University, 1910
- Occupations: Minister, peace advocate
- Spouse(s): Alice Mary Lambert (1882–1931; his death), 9 children

Walter Walsh, D.D., (13 April 1857 – 20 May 1931) was a Scottish religious leader and peace activist.

== Early life and education ==
Walsh was born in Dundee on 13 April 1857. He was educated at the High School of Dundee and the University of Glasgow. In 1910, he received his D.D. from Pittsburgh University.

== Career ==
Walsh served as a Congregational minister in Pitlochry (1882–86), Newcastle (1887–97), and Dundee (1897–1912). He was a member of the Newcastle-on-Tyne School Board (1891–97) and also served on the Dundee City Council (1906–12). In 1912, he was condemned for holding Universalist views by the Edinburgh Court of Session, and was deprived of church properties.

In 1913, he moved to London and replaced the late Charles Voysey as minister of the Theistic Church, which sought a middle path between Liberal Christianity and Unitarianism. In 1916, he became leader of the Free Religious Movement. He also took an interest in social issues such as pacifism, education, and housing. He was a municipal delegate to various housing conferences in Europe. He was also a vice-president of the Universal Peace Union and attended numerous international peace conferences in Europe and America, where he made several tours lecturing and preaching in connection with the international peace movement.

Walsh became a vegetarian in 1899 and was a speaker at the International Vegetarian Union in 1929. He was a vice-president of the London Vegetarian Society. He was also on the Advisory Committee of the League for the Prohibition of Cruel Sports. He commented that "the habit of killing and eating animals for human food is responsible for the coarse and brutal ethics that so largely prevail in Christendom".

== Personal life ==
In 1882, Walsh married Alice Mary Lambert (1855–1937). (Note: Some sources give her maiden name as Choat.) They had four sons and five daughters. He died in Whetstone, London on 20 May 1931, aged 74.

The Rev. Dr. Walsh is sometimes confused with his English contemporary Walter Walsh (1847–1912), a lay Protestant who also wrote works on religion; the two men do not appear to have been related.

== Selected bibliography ==
- The Moral Damage of War (1902)
- Jesus in Juteopolis (1906)
- The Greater Parables of Tolstoy (1906)
- Hymns of Divine Unity and Love (1915)
- The World Rebuilt (1917)
- The Golden Rule (1920)
