= Maria Freeman Gray =

American educator, feminist and socialist

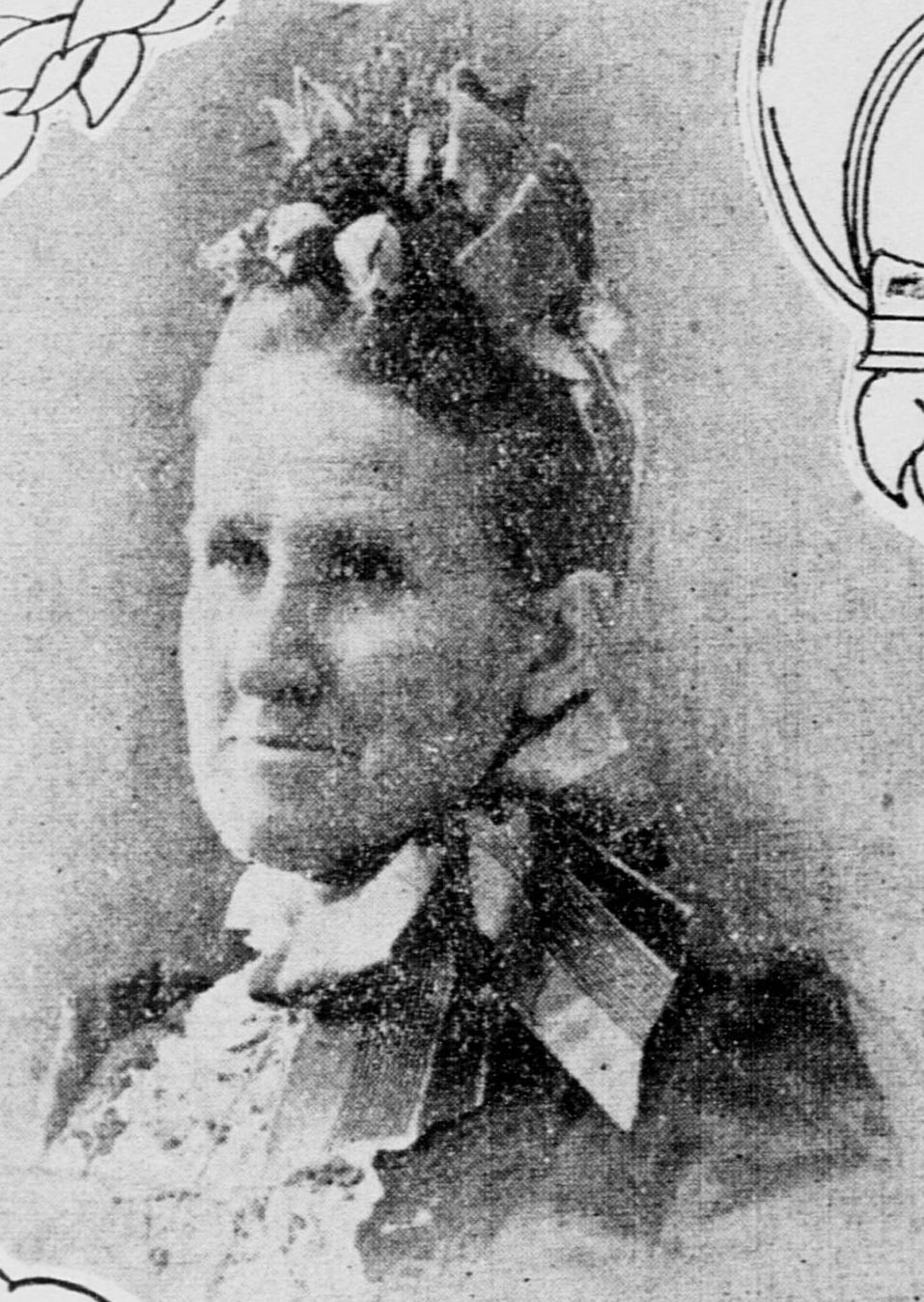
- Maria Freeman Gray in 1899
- Born: February 15, 1832; New Salem, Massachusetts
- Died: March 16, 1915 (aged 83); San Francisco, California

Maria Freeman Gray (1832–1915) was an American educator, feminist and socialist involved in the Anti-imperialism and Peace movements.

== Life ==
Gray was born in New Salem, Massachusetts on February 15, 1832. She attended Wilbraham Wesleyan Academy.

Gray traveled westward in 1852 under the auspices of the National Board of Popular Education, organized by Catharine Beecher to promote women as educators. She taught in various schools, including two years at Fort Wayne College. She married Judge John Henry Gray in 1855 and had two children, known as the Gray brothers. Her husband was well known for overturning an Iowa law that had kept free blacks from entering Iowa. He died in 1865.

In Iowa in 1862 Gray was president the state branch of the Women's Loyal League, an organization seeking to abolish slavery.

In California she was vice-president of the state branches of the Anti-Imperialist League, the Universal Peace Union, and the American Humane Education Society. In 1888, Gray and five other women ran for the San Francisco Board of Education. All six candidates lost, but considered it a kind of victory to have been competitive in a race in which women could not legally vote.

In 1900, Gray was chosen to represent California at an International Congress for the Rights of Women in conjunction with the Exposition Universelle in Paris. Gray wrote for newspapers and magazines, and was a member of the Pacific Coast Women's Press Association. She testified before Congress on behalf of this association in 1900.

== Beliefs ==
Gray was a socialist and a Quaker. She was a member of Race Street Meeting in Philadelphia.
