= Zerah C. Whipple =

American education reformer for deaf people (1849–1879)

Zerah C. Whipple (1 September 1849 – 12 September 1879) was a Rogerene American Christian pacifist, war tax resister, and developer of educational methods for the deaf.

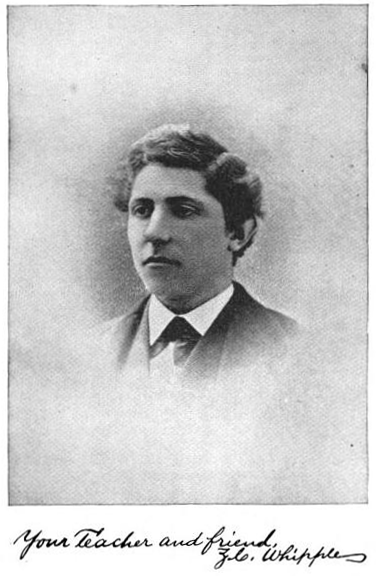
Zerah Colburn Whipple

== Peace work ==
Whipple was publisher of The Voice of Peace (formerly The Bond of Peace) from 1872 to 1874, the newsletter of the Connecticut Peace Society and later of the Universal Peace Union.

In the Summer of 1874, Whipple was jailed by the Ledyard, Connecticut tax collector, Christopher Gallup, for his refusal to pay a military tax (in this case, a fine assessed on men who did not participate in the state militia). After several days, a stranger who had heard about the case paid the tax and costs in order to have Whipple released. His jailing became a cause célèbre in the American peace movement of the time.

Whipple's grandfather Jonathan Whipple had also been threatened with arrest many years before, for the same reason (refusal either to serve in or pay a fine to the militia, for reasons of conscientious objection to war), but in his case the threat was not carried through.

== Work with the deaf ==
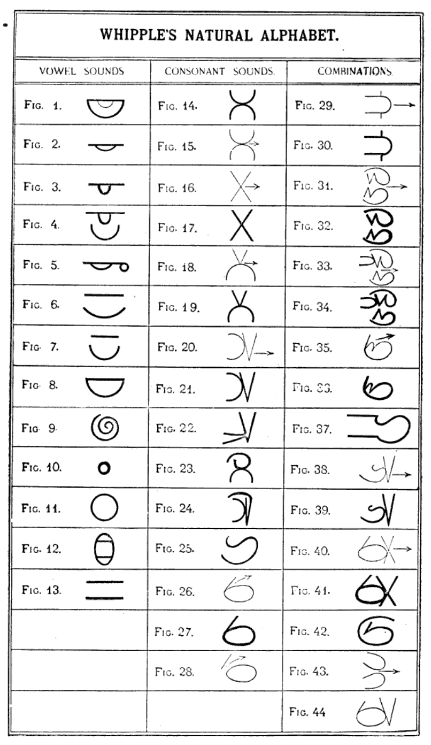
The various pictograms that make up Zerah C. Whipple's pronunciation learning alphabet for the deaf.

Whipple was known for his work with the deaf. He was inspired by his grandfather who had patiently taught his deaf son (Zerah's uncle) to speak and lip-read proficiently. Zerah's method emphasized lip-reading and learning to speak by using tactile and visible feedback, something he called the “Pure Oral Method” to distinguish it from attempts to teach sign language to the deaf, which he felt ghettoized their speech.

Whipple also developed a phonetic alphabet for the deaf to use when learning pronunciation. The letters in this alphabet were schematic representations of the position and motion of the vocal organs when pronouncing the sound.

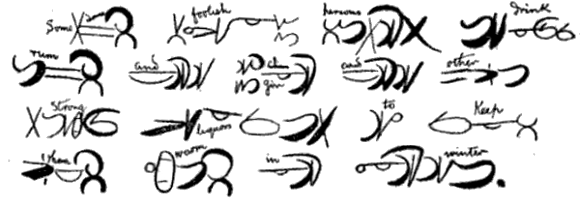
From a homework assignment using Whipple's phonetic alphabet: “Some foolish persons drink rum and gin and other strong liquors to keep them warm in Winter.”

Whipple's school operated until 1980, originally as “Whipple Home School for Deaf Mutes”, then “Mystic Oral School”, and later as “Mystic Educational Center.”

== Miscellaneous ==
In 1873, Whipple unsuccessfully petitioned U.S. president Ulysses S. Grant to commute the death sentences of prisoners captured in the Modoc War.
