= Emma Cornelia Sickels =

American teacher

Emma Cornelia Sickels (1854–1920) was an American teacher. She had a complex relationship with Indigenous peoples through her work with the United States government. White society regarded her as a hero for collecting information and mediating peace between the US and the Lakota people in 1890. During this time, she incorrectly blamed Native Americans for the Wounded Knee Massacre. In 1893, she was publicly fired from the Anthropology and Ethnology Department at the Chicago World's Fair for protesting how her boss was falsely showcasing Native American life to display Indigenous people as uncivilized.

== Early life ==
Sickels was born in 1854 in Massachusetts. She was the fourth child of George Edward Sickels and the second child of Maria Louisa née Smith.

Sickels went to college at Mount Holyoke Female Seminary in South Hadley, Massachusetts. She graduated in 1872. Soon after, she moved to Chicago, Illinois to teach. She never married.

== Career ==
In 1884, Sickels became the superintendent of the Indian Industrial Boarding School at Pine Ridge, South Dakota. The school grew under her leadership. She wrote that she left the school to study and teach domestic sciences in Chicago. While teaching, she reprimanded the daughter of Red Cloud, an Oglala Lakota leader, in 1884. In an 1893 interview, she said that Red Cloud came down with a thousand men ready to burn the school and kill her. She claimed that another Oglala Lakota leader, Little Wound, gathered an even bigger crowd to defend her.

She wrote a first-hand account of her work with some powerful Lakota chiefs to avoid warfare between them and the US government. Her story is not corroborated by any other records so many historians avoid discussing it. The story was published on December 21, 1890.

The federal government asked her to gather intelligence and talk with Lakota leadership on December 2, 1890. She received authority from the War and Interior Departments of the US government. The US Secretary of War, Redfield Proctor, and Commanding General of the United States Army, John Schofield, approved her work as a mediator. When Sickels arrived at the Pine Ridge Agency, Americans were preparing for war. Sickels became convinced that the Indigenous people living in Pine Ridge were pushing the US government to fight with Little Wound and the Brulés, a band of Teton Lakota people, so that they could take over the Agency. She planned to talk with Little Wound to reach a peaceful agreement. According to Sickels, Little Wound saw her as a spy and was prepared to kill her. She claimed she convinced the Lakota leader not to hurt her. She promised him that she would publish his grievances in a newspaper.

An article about Little Wound was written by Sickels and published in the Chicago Tribune on December 21, 1890. It detailed the starvation of Little Wound's people and his desire for peace. She also planned a meeting between Little Wound and Pine Ridge government officials. She wrote that Red Cloud was Little Wound's real enemy. She believed that he was causing trouble and telling newspapers he was Little Wound. She also claimed that Red Cloud wanted to kill her. The next time she visited Little Wound, she convinced him to visit the Pine Ridge Agency. Little Wound then made sure the Brules were not going to attack.

== Wounded Knee Massacre ==
Sickels was involved in the aftermath of the Wounded Knee Massacre. She falsely wrote that the Native Americans started the attack. On December 29, 1890, 500 US soldiers killed hundreds of Lakota men, women, and children in South Dakota.

Before the Massacre, the US government had banned the Ghost Dance ceremony and tried to arrest Sitting Bull, who was killed while being taken into custody. The doctrine of the ghost dance was that eventually, all indigenous people would happily live with no death, illness, or sadness. There would also be no white people in this world that would be formed naturally after the followers of this movement waited, danced, and prayed. It was believed that an earthquake would destroy all white people. When the religion reached Pine Ridge, the Oglala people living there decided to send delegates to the birthplace of the ghost dance movement in Nevada. Sickels published the story of the second group of delegates visiting Nevada in The Folk-Lorist magazine.

On December 28, the Seventh US Cavalry Regiment arrested a group of Lakota people who were traveling to the Pine Ridge Reservation. They were held near Wounded Knee Creek. Sickels believed they were coming to Pine Ridge to fight. She falsely wrote that if this group "had been successful, those who have been in readiness to join the uprising in their different places along the line from Texas to Montana, would have broken out". The next day, some of the Lakota in this group started to perform the Ghost Dance when they were forced to turn in their weapons. When the US soldiers saw the ceremony, they started shooting. 25 Army soldiers and at least 300 Lakota people were killed. Little Wound and the Brules saw this attack by the US government. Sickels believed that this conflict convinced the Brules to try to take over the Agency. The Brules also believed Little Wound had tried to trick them so they took him hostage.

On December 27, Sickels was in Nebraska. After hearing what had happened, she wanted to go to Pine Ridge. It took her four or five days to find a ranchman to drive her there. She did not witness the Massacre of Wounded Knee. When she arrived in Pine Ridge, she had Little Wound's lieutenant, Yellow Hair, meet General Nelson A. Miles. She made sure that Little Wound was seen as an ally to the US government after US soldiers were sent to arrest Little Wound and the Brules. A mediator, Chief Young-Man-of-Whom-Horses-Are-Afraid, was sent to negotiate peace with the Brules.

Plans were made for US soldiers to concentrate at the Agency. She wrote about how tense the atmosphere was where one misstep could end in a bloodbath. Sickels believed that by providing General Miles with information, she stopped the death of government agents. She blamed General John R. Brooke for putting the agency in danger. She attacked his decision to initially put no defense barriers around Pine Ridge. Two weeks after the Massacre, a group of Native Americans entered the agency. She described one Native American sniper who had a rifle aimed at General Miles when she stopped him. She told a passing soldier to tell General Miles to go inside. She reported that General Miles was about to attack the Native Americans around Pine Ridge when she stopped him. She convinced him to delay the order and want to talk to Lakota leaders. After talking to the chiefs, she wrote that "a half hour later the hostiles were in the agency and the uprising was at an end". When reflecting on the experience, she wrote "May I Never again be called to endure such moments as when I stood there facing the Indian with the thought that thousands of lives depended upon my absolute self-control".

On April 21, 1893, the New York Times named her the "heroine of Pine Ridge". She received a medal with the words "To Emma C. Sickels, the Heroine of Pine Ridge; for exceptional bravery in checking the Indian war of 1890." engraved on it. The metal was from the International Society of La Saveur of Paris.

== The 1893 Columbian Exposition ==
Several months after the Massacre, Sickels went to New York to organize an exhibit on Native American life for the New York Press Club. Illinois Congressman George Davis gave Sickels a political appointment to work under Frederic Ward Putnam at the 1893 Columbian Exposition. She believed she received this job as recognition of her work at Pine Ridge. Putnam did not approve of the appointment. However, she became one of the Anthropology and Ethnology Department's associates at Chicago's Columbian Exposition. Hundreds of Native Americans participated in the fair. The US government set up a model of a federal school for Native American children. Putnam and his team hoped to display a picture of white saviorism and primitive Native Americans. Putnam did not design his department's exhibit to showcase factual Native American life in the nineteenth century. Instead, he supported stereotypes and a view of this demographic as artifacts of the past. The Field Museum in Chicago took much of the Department's work after the fair closed.

Putnam fired Sickels on May 1, 1893, with Davis's signature on the dismissal. Sickels called out her department's false representations of Native American life. Before the fair started, in late 1892, she claimed that Native Americans would be so upset with the exhibits that there would be an uprising. While there was no uprising, many tribal citizens were very disappointed, such as Simon Pokagon, who wrote and distributed The Red Man's Rebuke (1892) during the exposition. Putnam fired Sickels for her protests. Sickels began writing to the New York Times, sharing with the public that some Native American groups were excluded from participating in the exhibits to display Native American culture as uncivilized. She also disagreed with the display of Kwakwakaʼwakw ceremonials. She accused Putnam of showcasing these dances to degrade Native Americans publicly in the New York Times. After she was publicly fired, Sickels went to work for the Board of Lady Managers.

One of Sickels's coworkers at the Columbian Exposition, James Mooney, started studying the Ghost Dance Religion around the same time as the Wounded Knee Massacre. During his work for the Exhibition, he wrote a book, The Ghost-Dance Religion and Wounded Knee. This is the first actual investigation into the causes of the conflict. The central narrative of the book is based on the words of George Sword, an Oglala Lakota man that was translated by Emma Sickels. This translation is the only primary source of the Ghost Dance Massacre told from a victim's side. She also collected Lakota ghost dance songs that Mooney published.

== Later in life ==
After the fair, she became secretary of the National Domestic Science Association and Natural Pure Food Association. She submitted an 1899 patent for purifying vegetable oils. She worked with Congress in the 1910s to improve nutrition guidelines.

She died on December 13, 1920, at Elgin State Hospital in Illinois. She was 66. She is buried in Mount Albion Cemetery in Albion, New York.
