= Dutton Speedwords =

International auxiliary language and abbreviated writing system

- Script type: printed shorthand and auxiliary language
- Creator: Reginald J. G. Dutton
- Created: 1922
- Published: 1935, 1946, 1951, 1971

Related scripts
- Parent systems: Latin: Dutton Speedwords

Dutton Speedwords
- Dutton Motez
- Created by: Reginald J. G. Dutton
- Date: 1922
- Purpose: Constructed language: Dutton Speedwords
- Writing system: Latin
- Sources: English, French, Latin, German

Language codes
- ISO 639-3: dws
- Glottolog: dutt1234

Dutton Speedwords, transcribed in Speedwords as Dutton Motez, is an international auxiliary language as well as an abbreviated writing system using the English alphabet for all the languages of the world. It was devised by Reginald J. G. Dutton (1886–1970) who initially ran a shorthand college promoting Dutton Shorthand (a geometric script), then offered a mail order (correspondence) self-education course in Speedwords while still supporting the Dutton Shorthand. The business was continued by his daughter Elizabeth after his death.

== Requirements for communication ==
Any transcription, note taking or correspondence system must fulfill six requirements:

1. Rules for ensuring an agreed vocabulary, how additions are included, and, how technical terms are expressed
2. Systematic method for representing the vocabulary including abbreviations or contractions or truncations, particularly where literal transcription is necessary
3. A pronunciation system that makes the vocalisation meaningful
4. A meaningful word order
5. Rule for designating or rejecting parts of speech
6. A method for learning the new system of communication

Ideally, these requirements should not be wholly biased toward English but consider European, Asian and Middle East languages.

The system of Speedwords created over 50 years by Dutton addresses all these requirements. Other systems have copied the solutions devised by Dutton without greatly improving his approach. One major advantage of Dutton's Speedwords is that it is readily available to everyone. Its current competitors either require pre-payment for materials before revealing the full details of their system or have a system that is a subset of the words necessary for a complete system.

== Objectives of Speedwords ==
Over time, three objectives were claimed by Dutton for Speedwords:

Initially, Dutton proposed Speedwords as an International Auxiliary Language (often abbreviated IAL) to encourage people to communicate internationally. Dutton wanted to provide a system that a sender could use which did not require them to learn the (foreign) language used by the recipient before establishing communication. Speedwords achieves this by relying on a deliberately small vocabulary. For international communication, the writer and reader are different, so, it is important that communication is unambiguous.

Then Dutton promoted Speedwords for high-speed writing. This used ideas and experience based on Dutton Shorthand. Dutton developed this stenographic method between 1919 and 1926. This approach also assumed that the writer and reader were different.

Up to this time, Speedwords avoided synonyms. Synonyms are variants of the same English word and treated them as equivalent. There are two possibilities:

- One Speedword for different parts of speech. For example, hon refers to sincere, sincerely, sincerity.
- The same Speedword covers several different English words (e.g., kla means class, kind, or sort. There are also derivatives of Speedwords (e.g., bi means life but there is also bie lively, bik vital, bir creature, biu welfare, biv spirit, bix death, bixk fatal, bixy kill, bixya murder.

Later, realising that some writing required literal transcription, Dutton expanded the vocabulary to allow words which are synonyms that were required to precisely distinguish shades of meaning. Dutton offered two methods to distinguish these synonyms which were required for literal transcription. The first was to use an initial capital letter. The capital letter indicates the Speedword is being used to denote a specific word not the range of words covered by a Speedword. These were officially recognised by being listed in the Speedwords Dictionary. The second method was to underline the Speedword. Dutton does not detail how this would work so it is assumed that this was left to the discretion of the Speedwords user.

Finally, Dutton promoted Speedwords for individual (personal) note writing and note reading. This approach assumed that the writer and reader were mostly the same person. Dutton encouraged this group of users to adopt some personal conventions to adapt it to their personal needs (e.g., underlining). The widely available "Teach Yourself Dutton Speedwords" was focused on the note-taking and note-making objective although Dutton still claimed it could also be used to fulfill the other objectives.

See § Design of Speedwords below for how these objectives were used to construct Speedwords.

== Usage ==
There are three possible uses: writing, speaking including dictation, and note taking.

=== Writing ===
This was the original use intended by Dutton. Speedwords would allow peoples with different national languages to communicate using Speedwords as the medium. This would be accomplished because it had a compact vocabulary and rigid meanings to avoid ambiguity. All versions of Speedwords were customised for writing and minimising the number of letters that had to be written.

=== Speaking including dictation ===
Criticisms in 1935-6 of the predecessor of Speedwords (called International 2 Letter Script which had many combinations of consonants) were focused on the difficulty in pronouncing strings of consonants. Speedwords overcame this deficiency.

=== Note taking ===
"Teach Yourself Dutton Speedwords" adapted Speedwords to note taking. It modified the standard Speedwords from written correspondence without any time pressure to allow taking notes at high speed.

== Competitors to Speedwords ==
There are three competitors to Speedwords. They are (1) shorthand as simplified letterforms, (2) shorthand as picture symbols, and (3) shorthand using non-stenographic systems (that is, alphabetic characters).

Simplified letterforms are also called stenographic shorthand systems. One type of letterform geometric is based on circles, parts of circles, and straight lines placed strictly horizontally, vertically or diagonally. The most popular example is Pitman shorthand released 1837, and many lesser-known systems such as Boyd's syllabic shorthand originally published 1903, as well as predecessor systems such as Duployan Shorthand. These use symbols which do not represent letters, but rather sounds so the words are written more or less as they are spoken. Contrasted with geometric are script shorthands that are oriented around the movement of the hand when writing. The original is Gabelsberger shorthand which began in Germany and spread through Europe. Script-geometric, or semi-script, shorthands are a hybrid of geometric systems and the script systems. The notable example is Gregg shorthand first published in 1888. Other examples include Superwrite, Easyscript, Keyscript, Speedwriting, Quickscript, Breviogrph, Stenoscript ABC, and Teeline.

Picture symbols were proposed by Austrian Charles K. Bliss (1897–1985) who created Blissymbolics in 1949 as a universal written language for speakers of any language to learn and communicate. It avoided the problems of constructed quasi-European language like Esperanto, or, natural languages such as English. Blissymbolics was conceived as a purely visual, speech-less language but provided a basic vocabulary that could be spoken.

Non-stenographic systems or alphabetic systems may also supplement the alphabetic characters by using punctuation marks as additional characters, give different meanings when letters are capitalised, or add non-alphabetic symbols. The most popular of these is Esperanto. Dutton contrasted Speedwords with its major rival Esperanto by claiming correctly that Speedwords had a smaller vocabulary and did not require the extensive study that was required to converse or write Esperanto. Another rapid writing system with a similar name, Speedwriting (also called Brief English Systems), was invented by Emma Dearborn at Simmons College, Columbia University and published in 1925. Her method used letters of the alphabet and some punctuation marks to represent the sounds of English which could be reproduced on the typewriter. Dearborn initially franchised teaching and then sold the rights which passed between various companies who made further changes and marketed it throughout the US and in various languages (e.g., Spanish). Other methods included Personal Shorthand also known as Briefscript, and Keyscript. Forkner Shorthand was promoted as an alternative to Pitman shorthand from 1955–1995 but is no longer taught.

The benchmark for pronunciation is the International Phonetic Alphabet (IPA) produced by the International Phonetic Association. It is easily printable by hand or keyboard although its conventions are often not used to depict pronunciation in dictionaries and other reference materials.

The major reason that Dutton Speedwords continues to receive attention is its strict alphabetical constraint that allows it to be used on a keyboard, and the breadth of practical application which Dutton embodied in his system.

== Design of Speedwords ==
The design of Speedwords has four features:

1. Unlike other shorthand methods, (e.g., Pitman, Gregg) which use new symbols, strokes or geometric shapes, Speedwords method uses the 26 letters of the English alphabet (upper and lower case) plus the ampersand symbol ('&').
2. Unlike most other shorthand and rapid writing methods, Speedwords has its roots in a shorthand system that Dutton found cumbersome and which he believed he overcame by using alphabetic characters.
3. Unlike other shorthand and rapid writing systems, Dutton emphasised the speed of learning.
4. Like other shorthand systems, Dutton sought to maximise speed and minimise the amount of writing.

== Principles of Speedwords ==
In all publications, Dutton describes various principles of Speedwords but there is no consolidated list of principles. They can be summarised as:

1. Select its vocabulary from the entire Indo-European language family, particularly maximising the internationality of words, that is, selecting a word that is common between languages.
2. Abbreviate those words guided by a 1925 analysis by Horn on the frequency of words. The most frequently used words were allocated the shortest abbreviation. So the most frequent words have just one letter.
3. Structure the vocabulary around high frequency words. A 1,000 word vocabulary handles 85% of daily conversation while a 3,000 word vocabulary handles 98% of daily conversation so Speedwords only needs a simple rule for 2% of its vocabulary. Dutton seems to suggest that the solution is to write out the word in full.
4. Make one Speedword have only one meaning which results in a basic vocabulary which Dutton calls 'keywords'.
5. Avoid grammatical differences, so a keyword can also refer to noun, verb, adjective, adverb.
6. Create other meanings by adding suffixes to show relationships or create antonyms.

While this approach is sound, it has both advantages and a few disadvantages discussed below.

Speedwords was meant to be written and spoken, so Dutton provided some guidelines on pronunciation which is included below.

== Advantages ==
In Teach Yourself Dutton Speedwords, Dutton claims at least eight benefits from Speedwords:

1. Knowing just a few Speedwords (he means the one letter Speedwords) allows immediate savings in time and effort. The words can be substituted for the English equivalents as the Speedwords vocabulary is learnt. This contrasts with geometric shorthand shapes that require the entire system to be mastered.
2. It uses the English alphabet. This means it Speedwords can be written or typed.
3. It uses a range of Indo-European words. So, its vocabulary has an "international currency".
4. Speedwords are chosen based on the frequency of usage. This means that the most frequently used words are the shortest.
5. Correspondence can be exchanged between the individual writers without having to learn the foreign language of all their many correspondents. This means the writers can be ignorant of the language of their correspondent.
6. Knowing speed words takes between 20 and 30 hours. The work of learning "is a fascinating pastime and in no sense an arduous task"
7. Speedwords makes 5 out of 6 words far shorter. This increases the speed of writing and note taking approximately 100-120 words per minute or up to 150 wpm.
8. The 'hurdle' to overcome language barriers is considerably reduced because the Speedwords vocabulary is small. The basic vocabulary is 493 words. The more extensive vocabulary is 1,000 words.

== Disadvantages ==
The disadvantages appear to be:

1. No-one is developing Speedwords. So authoritative information about it is now hard to find, except for the Teach Yourself Dutton Speedwords book. Some have taken Speedwords and adapted it. For example, see Briefscript by Ray Brown at
2. The Teach Yourself Dutton Speedwords book does not have a full discussion of pronunciation. Dutton suggests is essential to using Speedwords. Hearsay is that Dutton had a simplified pronunciation system which may have been shared with some inquirers after his death, but it was never published.
3. Dutton did not disclose the rules he used to formulate Speedwords. So there are several apparent anomalies and obscurities. Also, Dutton appears to make arbitrary decisions on the choice of a Speedword. For example, on page 25 Dutton states that 'ao' means 'away' although 'ax' would be logical. However, 'ax' has already been used to mean 'ask'. This shows that over 50 years Dutton had not reached 100% perfection of his system. This is consistent with the effort required to be expended to fully complete as shown by the Pareto Principle. Also, on TYDS, page 25 Dutton used the Speedword 'dy' for 'since' but gives the rationale French 'depuis' but it does not contain 'y' and in French could also translate to 'for' which already has the Speedword 'f'.
4. Some guidelines stated in Teach Yourself Dutton Speedwords book are difficult to apply. For example, Dutton allows the reader to use synonyms for the basic Speedwords and distinguishes them from the basic speedwords by capitalising their first letter. Also, for example, English 'at' becomes the Speedword 'A' because Speedword 'a' means 'to'.
5. Dutton says the reader can create their own supplementary list but does not detail how this is done or how she or he manages it.

None of these disadvantages prevent its successful use for personal note taking.

== Achievements of Dutton ==
Dutton Speedwords continues to be used to despite its orphan status because of his useful qualities:

1. Dutton kept the vocabulary compact. This was achieved by using frequency of use as the criterion.
2. Dutton provided a proven learning approach which makes it easy to master. He emphasised incremental learning with repetition.
3. Dutton persevered with it over a long period. During the period 1933–1970 (until his death) it was refined with his personal experience and feedback from adopters and students.

== Evolution of speedwords ==
It appears that Speedwords developed in five main stages:

1. As a competitor to Pitman and Gregg shorthand. Based on the available Dutton shorthand publications held in libraries this occurred 1919–1925. At this point, it was a geometric shorthand method that competed with Pitman and Gregg shorthand methods and did not use the English alphabet.
2. Under the influence of Horn's frequently used words list, an early attempt was made to develop an alternate international abbreviated language. Dutton expressed this in his one-page sheet called International 2-letter correspondence symbols (published 1933).
3. Further development occurred to create an alternate international language. It began in 1935 when International 2-letter correspondence symbols were revised and reissued in 1935 as International Symbolic Script. Another version called Word Speedwords was published between 1941–1945. There is a booklet of the same name published in 1946 which appears to contain 100 Speedwords. Despite attempts by Dutton to popularise World Speedwords it was not adopted as an international language. The intention expressed on page 88 in Teach Yourself Dutton Speedwords (1951) to produce language-specific versions of the Speedwords course, did not eventuate. It appears another variation called Dutton Youth Speedwords was published in 1943. Both World Speedwords and Speedwords used words from Flemish (Dutch), French, German, Greek, Latin, Portuguese, Scandinavia, Slav, and Spanish are sources for both World Speedwords and Speedwords.
4. By 1946 it had been renamed Speedwords. By 1951 Dutton conceded that Speedwords was ideal for individual note taking and note making and made some variations to Word Speedwords to adapt it for the new purpose. His audience is, therefore, students and time-poor people seeking to make the best use of their time or people who incur high costs in communication. He comments that he hopes that "the student who has worked through the present course will look to this wide horizon that is, international communication so Dutton always maintained his duality of objectives and functions.
5. It has been revived from time to time in its own right as well as with adaptations. The Dutton Society (no longer extant) promoted Speedwords. Some time management writers and computer specialists who describe online applications including e-mail and situations where communication is either slow or expensive.

== Foreign-language versions of Speedwords ==
In Teach Yourself Dutton Speedwords, Dutton says that "It is intended to publish this Speedwords course in all the major languages of both hemispheres."

This did not occur. It is unclear whether the impediment was (a) problems that equivalents (including the use of suffixes) were not suitable in foreign languages, (b) authors of the foreign-language versions of Speedwords were not forthcoming, (c) lack of a publisher, or (d) anomalies and difficulties became apparent when Speedwords was translated, making the English- and foreign-language version no longer uniform.

== Sources describing Dutton Speedwords ==
There are three main sources of information about Speedwords: (1) Speedwords booklets/pamphlets issued by Dutton, (2) the Teach Yourself Dutton Speedwords book in the Teach Yourself series and (3) third party publications, commentaries and webpages (see the references).

=== Dutton booklets/pamphlets ===
All the Dutton Speedwords booklets published between 1933 and 1951 are out of print. Very few libraries show holdings of copies. Helpful booklets used in preparing this page were the Speedwords dictionary. It consists of 4,000 basic and with derivatives 10,000 English-Speedword and Speedword-English words.

=== "Teach Yourself Speedwords" (1951, 1962, 1971, 1973) ===
A more accessible version focused on note taking and note making called Dutton Speedwords was published in 1951 in the Teach Yourself series published by English Universities Press as a hardcover. It was reprinted in 1959 and 1962 (with the distinctive yellow dustjacket for both years).

A revised edition was published in 1971. It was reissued in 1973 as a paperback. The only revisions made in 1971 were in Part 1 of the high-speed vocabulary appendix. Part 2 of the High-Speed appendix which is aimed solely at English speakers was unchanged between the original 1951 and revised 1971 editions. Copies of the 1951 and 1971 editions are relatively easy to find second hand. The 1951 edition and its 1962 reprint are printed on higher quality paper than the updated 1971/1973 edition which has yellowed pages that easily tear.

Both 1951 and 1971 editions have misprints. This is an incomplete list:

1. Paragraph number 83 occurs twice: once in Lesson 8, and, also in the High-Speed Appendix.
2. Lists in Speedwords are frequently not in alphabetical order: for example, 'fon' and 'for' in the Alphabetic Speedwords list is out of order.

=== Third party publications, commentaries, and webpages ===
The references below list some third-party publications and commentaries that are still available. (However, as noted below in the section on teaching/learning many promoters of Dutton Speedwords have an incomplete understanding of its use.)

Many authoritative webpages produced in the late 1990s and early 2000s are no longer available as the domain URL is defunct. These missing webpages included:

- Material made available by the Dutton Society
- Robert Petry pages when he was promoting Speedwords in approximately 1997
- Pages by the New Congress/Der Neue Kongress s.Z. who promised a new revised edition of Dutton's Speedwords. However, there is no record of a library holding the reissued publication by New Congress/Der Neue Kongress s.Z.

== Timeline of Speedwords & Publication dates ==
Dutton was assiduous in developing Speedwords and its predecessor Dutton shorthand. After developing Dutton shorthand, Dutton continued to improve it. But then realising the shortcomings of using shorthand, Dutton develops Dutton Shorthand. Dutton Shorthand was also revised many times. Dutton never gave up refining Speedwords, advocating its merits, and offering it for sale and as a correspondence course.

Below is a selection of publications that Dutton produced over his lifetime.

=== Dutton shorthand publications ===
1915 Dutton 24-hour shorthand (First edition).
1916 Dutton Shorthand as a competitor to Pitman and Gregg shorthand called "Shorthand in Three Days" [with Key].
1917 Dutton 24-hour shorthand (Second edition). Skegness : Dutton Educational Co.
1919 Dutton revises Dutton Shorthand renamed as "Dutton One Week Shorthand" containing 12 lessons that could be mastered in one week.
? Dutton shorthand textbook.
? Key to Dutton shorthand textbook.
? Key to select readings in Dutton's shorthand.
? Key to business letters in Dutton's shorthand.
1919 Business letters in Dutton's shorthand (Book 1). Skegness : Dutton Educational Co.
1918 Dutton's Shorthand Phrase Book.
1919 Dutton speed practice book.
1919 Select readings in Dutton's shorthand (with Key) Book 1. Skegness : Dutton Educational Co.
1917 Dutton's shorthand dictionary 13,000 shorthand outlines (First edition).
? Dutton's shorthand phrase book containing the outlines of nearly 2,000 useful phrases with exercises therein marked for dictation.
1919 Dutton's shorthand dictionary 13,000 shorthand outlines (Second edition).
1919 Graded exercises and key.
? Dictation exercises
1937 Dutton's 24-hour shorthand : the system for the million. London: Dutton's Shorthand College
1951 Dutton Shorthand [Reprint]

These publications continued to be available in the 1960s and 1970s.

=== Transition from Shorthand to Speedwords ===
1933 International 2 Letter Script. Skegness: Dutton's.
1935 reprint (?) of International 2 Letter Script

This publication is described by Dutton in an article to the Royal Society. It uses one letter of the English alphabet which was assigned to a class of meaning, apparently directly inspired by Roget's Thesaurus. There was no pronunciation system and criticisms of this omission resulted in Speedwords.

=== Speedwords publications ===
1935 Unknown title which converts International 2 Letter Script into Speedwords
1940 480 Speedwords
1940? 100 speedwords with 20 exercises (with World Speedwords as the title on page 3)
1940? Dutton double-speed longhand (advertised on the back page of Dictation Exercises on the one thousand most used words booklet)
1941 Dutton 480 Universal Speedwords. (Second edition).
1942 Dutton 480 Universal Speedwords. (Third edition).
1943 Dutton World Youth Speedwords with an introduction by C.E.M. Joad
1943 (June) Dutton Double-Speed Words (first edition) with a Foreword by Dr. C E M Joad and an open letter to the young people of all nations from the inventor of World Double-Speed Words
1943 (June) Dutton Double-Speed Words Companion to text-book (first edition)
1944 Dutton Double-Speed Words (second edition) with a Foreword by Dr. C E M Joad and an open letter to the young people of all nations from the inventor of World Double-Speed Words
1945 Dutton Speedwords Dictionary. London : Dutton Publications.
1945 (May) Dutton Double-Speed Words Companion to text-book (second edition). London : Dutton Publications.
1945 (June) Dutton speedwords dictionary (Third edition). London : Dutton Publications.
1946 (July) Dutton Double-Speed Words (third edition) with a Foreword by Dr. C E M Joad and an open letter to the young people of all nations from the inventor of World Double-Speed Words with comments by the Dean of Canterbury, Professor Lancelot Higben, Dr. Frederick Bodmer, and Eric Partidge
1946 (July) Dutton Double-Speed Words Companion to text-book (third edition). London : Dutton Publications.
1946 World speedwords. London : Dutton Publications.
1946 Supplement to the Dutton World Double-Speed Words text-book. London : Dutton Publications.
1946 100 Speedwords with 20 exercises. London : Dutton Publications.
1946 Dictation Exercises on the Thousand most Used Words. London : Dutton Publications.
1951 Dutton Speedwords Dictionary (Fourth edition)
1951 Teach Yourself Dutton Speedwords published in the English Universities Press Teach Yourself series a publisher which specializes in self-instruction books
1951 Common market speedwords (4th edition) [Not listed in any library holding but listed in the 1951 edition of Teach Yourself Speedwords]
1959 Reprint of the 1951 edition of Teach Yourself Dutton Speedwords
1962 Reprint of the 1951 edition of Teach Yourself Dutton Speedwords
1971 Revised edition of Teach Yourself Dutton Speedwords published in the English Universities Press Teach Yourself series
1973 Reprint of the 1971 edition of Teach Yourself Dutton Speedwords

== Size of Speedwords vocabulary ==
Dutton variously suggests the size of the Speedwords vocabulary ranges from 493 to 10,000:

- 493 Speedwords. These are Speedword stems or elements.
- 1,000 Speedwords. These are the most frequently used words
- 4,000 Speedwords. These are the words in the Speedwords Dictionary.
- 10,000 Speedwords. These are derivatives of Speedwords.

=== Method of teaching/learning ===
Speedwords was taught as a correspondence course by both Dutton and his daughter in the pre and post World War 2 period. Their course was supported by an extensive array of booklets that he had developed. Many of the booklets are listed in the timeline section. The option of enrolling in a course offered directly by Dutton's organisation or third parties is no longer available.

Several system such as Forkner shorthand emphasised replacing some longhand writing with shortcuts as soon as they begin studying the system. Many systems also claimed it was possible to achieve dictation rates above 50 words per minute. These all have learning times of a year or more.

Learning Dutton Speedwords takes around a week to a fortnight. Dutton cites data from his records which show that learning the takes between 20 and 24 hours with 30 hours being the maximum. To improve retention, Dutton agrees that individual Speedwords can be substituted one or two at a time. However, Dutton emphasises that the entire Speedwords system can be learnt quickly and therefore it is not necessary to learn it piecemeal.

Occasionally, a webpage author or blogger will provide a selective summary of Speedwords (typically, the one and two-letter Speedwords) together with some illustrations or highlights of the method. They are not recommended because they either mis-state Dutton or are incomplete. The chief characteristic of Dutton Speedwords is its detail and the extensive guidelines Dutton provides in his booklets.

=== Resources for learning ===
A few lucky people may be able to read some of the Speedwords booklets Dutton published between 1940–1951. The booklets promote the other booklets which were available but do not explain their interrelationship. So this is a brief description on how to use them. Essentially there are four interrelated booklets. All four are required. They are: (1) The "textbook". (2) The "companion". It provides additional exercises and the answers to exercises in the textbook. (3) The "supplement". It provides further exercises with answers to enhance learning through additional practice (4) The bi-lingual vocabulary. This is an alphabetic list of Speedwords (between 3,00 and 10,000 depending upon the edition) with their English equivalent, as well as an English-to-Speedwords lookup list. The vocabulary contains an introductory commentary by Dutton which is valuable for understanding and using the dictionary. Depending upon when they were published, they may be called "Dutton Speedwords, "Dutton Double Speedwords", "Duttom Youth Speedwords" or "Dutton World Speeedwords". They were published at different times with different titles and contain minor differences. There is usually more than one edition of each. Later editions (1946 or preferably 1951) are the most complete and up-to-date. They usually contain an explanation of any changes made in the latest edition.

The most common authoritative source is "Teach Yourself Dutton Speedwords". It is focused on note taking. It contains eight lessons, an appendix and a dictionary with about 1,00 speedwords.

== International versus English/domestic use of Speedwords ==
One important factor that can affect learning is whether communication is between speakers of Indo-European languages. Learning Speedwords is affected by background. It is oriented to the English language in its vocabulary and sentence construction. Dutton claims that memorisation will be slower for non-Indo-European language speakers, they will be able to extend their vocabulary as easily once the vocabulary is mastered. This means the learner must always be conscious of whether Dutton is describing Speedwords to be used in international communication or the English only use.

The English-only use makes concessions that are counterproductive to international communication. Those concessions can be summarised as:

1. Using selected synonyms found in English which are designated by the word being given a capital letter. For example, 'O' for 'sir'.
2. Recognising an even wider range of synonyms and additional words that are not distinguished in any way from the internationally usable Speedwords.
3. Abbreviating some Speedwords (contractions) which may be inconsistent with international use. For example, 'Bil' for 'bill' when there already is 'bil' used for 'account'.
4. Using Speedwords with abbreviations which will be meaningless in international use. For example, omit the 'i' from 'bil'.
5. Creating compounds with additional suffixes. For example, the new suffix '-c' is used to -tion, tious, -cious, -tial, ture, -sure while '-m' is used to express -ment.
6. Creating compounds of Speedwords which may be inconsistent with international use. For example, 'ze' + 'nav' is abbreviated 'zev'.

Consequently, the learner of Speedwords needs to be aware that some of the extensions they make and use, may inhibit rather than facilitate international communication.

== Lexicon ==
The principle behind the choice of word roots of Dutton Speedwords is the maxim that frequently used words should be shorter than seldom-used words in order to speed up communication (see information theory). There are 493 one-, two- and three-letter roots. The 46 most frequent English words are equated with 27 one-letter Speedword roots also called parent words in the Teach Yourself Dutton Speedwords book:

a [aː] "at, to" (< French à)
b [bʊt] "but, butt" (< English)
c [tʃə/tʃi] "this" (< French ce)
d [də/di] "of, from" (< French de)
e [eː] "to be, is, am, are" (< French est)
f [froː] "for" (< English)
g [ɡə/ɡi] "they, them"
h [hiː] "has, have" (< English?)
i [iː] "in, within" (< English)
j [ʒə/ʒi] "I, me" (< French je)
k [kə/ki] "that" [conjunction] (< French que)
l [lə/li] "the" (< French le)
m [mɪt] "with" (< German mit)
n [nɔt] "no, not" (< English)
o [oː] "on" (< English)
p [pə/pi] "can, to be able" (< French peut)
q [kwə/kwi] "do (question particle), question, query" (< English)
r [rə/ri] "will, shall" (< ?)
s [sə/si] "he, him" (< French se)

sh [ʃə/ʃi] "she, her" (< English)

t [tə/ti] "it" (< English)
u [uː] "a, an, one" (< Latin unus)
v [və/vi] "you" (< French vous)
w [wə/wi] "we, us" (< English)
x [ɪks] "whether, if"
y [joː] "was, were"
z [zuː] "as, then" (< English? "zen"?)
& [and] "and" (< English)

Some two- and three-letter words are

good -- gu
know -- sa
love -- am
beautiful -- bel
language -- lin
game, play -- lud

(Note that all but the first of these examples are taken from Latin roots —sapio, amo, bellus, lingua, ludus—as are "room" and "sleep" below—camera and dormio—while "good" and the root for "air" below come from German: gut, luft.)

The few hundred roots are combined through the use of affixes to expand vocabulary. For example: the affix -a indicates an unfavorable connotation to the root-word; thus, bixy = kill, bixya = murder. Some compounds appear fanciful, or at least not immediately transparent, such as ky + luf (eat + air) to mean "picnic". Grammatical features include the use of single letters (as opposed to verb conjugations) to indicate tense; the letter r indicates future tense and y indicates past. Thus, j sa = I know, j ysa = I knew, j r sa = I will know. Nouns and verbs have the same form (as do many English words: the light, I light, etc.) as do adverbs and adjectives (bel = "beautiful" and "beautifully"). Compounds follow a headnoun-modifier sequence, as in ca + dor (room + sleep) = bedroom.

== Phonology and orthography ==
Dutton orthography is irregular. It is combined with phonology below.

=== Stress ===
Stress is on the first syllable (first vowel), except that the opposite suffix -o is always stressed, and the verbal prefixes u- (present participle) and y- (past tense) are never stressed.

=== Vowels ===
Vowels are rather similar to Latin. When a vowel occurs at the end of a morpheme or before another vowel, it is long, otherwise, it is usually short (though some suffixes shorten a preceding morpheme-final vowel).

Letter	a	e	i	o	u	au	y	-
Long	"ah" [aː]	"eh" [eː]	"ee" [iː]	"oh" [oː]	"oo" [uː]	"ow" [au̯]	"might" [ai̯]	"sofa" [ə]
Short	"at" [a]	"get" [ɛ]	"it" [ɪ]	"od" [ɔ]	"put" [ʊ]	"ow" [au̯]	"might" [ai̯]	"sofa" [ə]

Vowel length for the most part not phonemic, but are determined by position. However, there is morphophonemic contrast in a few cases where a root word contrasts with a suffixed word, with suffixes that do not shorten the vowel. For example,

pad [paːd] "paid" (pa "pay" + -d passive participle) vs pad [pad] "pad";
sud" [suːd] "improved' ( "su" + -d passive participle) vs sud [sʊd] "sudden".

Only au and y are diphthongs. Other sequences of vowels are pronounced in separate syllables, e.g. eis "ice" is [ˈeː.ɪs]. Vowel sequences in roots are ei, eu, oi, oe, ui, ue, ia, io, iu. The sequences ie, uo are found in written contractions, but may not be pronounced that way since all written contractions should be pronounced in full.

"Y" is a consonant in ye [jɛ] "yes" and in y [ˈjoː] "was, were" only.

=== Consonants ===
Consonants are mostly as in the IPA; e.g., s is always voiceless, as in "less", g is always hard, as in "get", and r is trilled, as in Scots and Italian. Exceptions:

- c is [tʃ] (as in "itch")
- j is [ʒ] (as in French)
- q is [kw] (as in "quick")
- sh is [ʃ] (as in English)
- x is [ks] (as in English)

Words spelled as a single consonant are usually pronounced as that consonant plus a "very short ee" before a vowel, and as that consonant + schwa otherwise, clearly mirroring Dutton's pronunciation of the e in "the." The suffixes -r (agent) and -z (plural) are pronounced with a preceding schwa when they follow a consonant.

[ʒ, h] do not occur in final position. [ʃ] only occurs in final position in an unwritten affix. A nasal [ŋ] occurs (in final position only) in two affixes, but is not written in either. (See below.) [j] occurs initially in just two words, ye and y; finally it arguably ends the diphthong y. The letter w does not occur in final position, but [w] arguably ends the diphthong au.

Consonant sequences in word-initial position are bl, br, pl, pr, dr, tr, gl, gr, kl, kr, fl, fr, sl, q [kw], sp, st. The only consonant sequence in root-medial position is tt in otto "eight". Consonant sequences in word-final position are nd, nt, ng, lk, rb, rd, rt, rg, rk, rm, rn, st, sk, and x [ks]. But aq, though written with final consonant, is pronounced ['akwə]).

=== Unwritten consonants and vowels ===
Some morphemes spelled with a single consonant have an unwritten vowel, and one prefix spelled with a single vowel has an unwritten consonant:

- b "but" is [bʊt], as in English "but"
- -c (a suffix) is [tʃoː], as if it were written co. That is, lec "mail" is pronounced [ˈleːtʃoː], not *[ˈlɛtʃ].
- f "for" is [froː], as if it were written fro
- m "with" is [mɪt], as if it were written mit
- n "not" is [nɔt], as if it were written not
- -st "-ist" is [ɪst], as if it were written ist
- u- (participle) is [ʊŋ]
  (though "having" is hu [hʊŋ] rather than expected *uh)
- x "if" is [ɛks], as if it were written ex
- y "was/were" is [joː], as if it were written yo (with the y pronounced as a consonant)
- z "as" is [zuː], as if it were written zu
- & "and" is [and], as if it were written and

In the versions of Speedwords prior to 1951, h "have/has" (perfect tense auxiliary) is [hiː], as if it were written hi; however, in the 1951 Dutton Speedwords Dictionary, we find that pre-1951 hid "hide" has become hi [hiː]. It is very unlikely Dutton would have kept h and hi as homophones; but we are not told how h is now to be pronounced.

Note: h (and its past tense hy and present participle hu) is used only as an auxiliary verb; "have/has" in the sense of "have/has got" is ha [haː]

Some suffixes have an unwritten vowel that only occurs after certain consonants. They are detailed below.

=== Affixes ===
As noted above, the prefixes past-tense y- [ai̯] and u- [ʊŋ] do not take stress, and u- is pronounced with an unwritten engma. Me- [meː] and my- [mai̯] also remain unstressed when forming comparatives and superlatives, e.g. mebel [meː'bɛl] "more beautiful", mybel [mai̯'bɛl] "most beautiful".

Suffixed vowels are long and take an epenthetic [j] (English y) when following a vowel. For example, gree "awfully, extremely" (< are + e) is pronounced [ˈgreːjeː], mua "too (much)" (< mua + a) is [ˈmuːjaː] and dau "allow, grant" (< da + u) is [ˈdaːjuː]

The suffixes -n and -st are derived from the speedwords un "negative" and its "professional" and are always pronounced in full and take an epenthetic [j] when following a vowel, e.g. gan "scarcely" (< ga + n) is [ˈɡaːjʊn] and rist "clerk" (< ri + st) is [ˈriːjɪst].

The words co "collect, collection" and za "dear, endearment, intimate" may also be used as suffixes; if appended to a word ending in a vowel, they do not shorten that vowel, e.g. lec "correspondence, mail" is [ˈleːtʃoː] and perza "dad(dy), papa" is [ˈpɛrzaː]

Suffixes pronounced as a single consonant after a vowel generally shorten that vowel. The exceptions are -d, -z, -r, which leave the vowel long. (As noted above, -z and -r take an epenthetic schwa after any consonant.) Many consonants are pronounced with an unwritten vowel after certain consonants:

- -d is pronounced [d] after vowels and voiced consonants but d, and [ɛd] after d and voiceless consonants.
- -m (derived from the word om "article, object, thing") shortens a preceding vowel and is pronounced [ɔm] after any consonant, e.g. dam "donation, gift, present" (< da + m) is [dam] and tegm "cover, lid" (< teg + m) is [ˈtegɔm]
- Other single-consonant suffixes - -b (< ib "possible"), -g (< ig "general"), -k (< ik "property, quality", -l (< il "particular (e)special", -p (< ep "location, place, position, set, put"), -s (< is "complement") and -t (< et "little, small") - shorten the preceding vowel and, when they "can be articulated without difficulty" are pronounced as a single consonant after another consonant, otherwise they are pronounced in full as the words from they are derived after other consonants. Dutton adds that -s must always be pronounced [ɪs] after word ending in -k or -g "to avoid confusion with the suffix -x.

In addition, three suffixes have completely different forms after consonants and vowels:

- -f after vowels and -y after consonants
- -v after vowels and -i after consonants
- -x after vowels and -o after consonants

f ~ -y are obviously abstracted from fy "cause, make, reason, render"; the pairs -v ~ -i and -x ~ -o appear to be arbitrary creations.

Also in the pre-1951 version of Speedwords, Dutton gave the apostrophe as a possessive suffix pronounced [zai̯], e.g. l mant'kap [lə'mantzai̯kap] "the boy's head". But in the 1951 Dictionary Dutton list a new root word zy [zai̯] "disease". It is inconceivable that Dutton would have retained the apostrophe homophonous with zy "disease." The apostrophe is retained in "Teach Yourself Dutton Speedwords" (1951, 1971) but there is no indication how this is to be pronounced.

=== Irregularities to avoid homophones ===
The only examples specifically given by Dutton are:

1. "away" as an opposite of directional a "to" is ao [aː'joː] as *ax would be homophonous with ax "ask."
2. The agent suffix -r (< er "person") is written as the full word and pronounced with an epenthetic [j], when it would otherwise create a homophone with an existing word. For example, "maker" is maer [ˈmaːjɛr] to avoid confusion with mar [mar] "marry, marriage" (In "Dutton Double-Speed Words Companion to Text-Book", Dutton also gives jeer "judge" [ˈʒuːjɛr] to avoid confusion with jur [ʒʊr] "law, legal"; in the 1951 Dictionary, however, "judge" is given as just [ˈʒuːjɪst]

Following 2 above, we may reasonably assume that if adding -b, -c, -g, -k, -l, -m, -n, -p, -s or -t, then the full word from which these are derived would have been written and pronounced with an epenthetic [j], thus *noib "noticeable" [ˈnoːjɪb] to avoid confusion with nob "celebrated, honour, note, repute" [nɔb].

Following 1 above, we may reasonably assume that this would always be the case if by adding -x a homophone would have been created. We may also assume that the same would apply to the -v ~ -i pair, i.e. if by adding -v we had a homophone, we must add -i [ˈjiː instead; the same well have applied to the -f ~ y pair, i.e. if by adding -f we had a homophone, we must add -y [ˈjai̯ instead; but as these suffixes derive from the word fy, it may be that Dutton, following 1 above, would have added -fy.

=== Compound words ===
When two roots form a compound, the unwritten affix [ŋ] is placed after the first root. When three roots form a compound, the unwritten affix [ʃ] is placed after the first root. Either affix takes an epenthetic [ɪ] after a consonant.

Examples:

albe "already" (< al + be) is [ˈalɪŋbeː]
diel "telephone" (< di + el) is [ˈdiːŋɛl]
rysan "hospital" (< ry + san) is [ˈrai̯ŋsan]
opmekav "anti-aircraft" (< op + mek + av) is [ˈɔpɪʃmɛkav] 'OPP-ish-mek-avv'
ryefki "gymnasium" (< ry + ef + ki) is [ˈrai̯ʃɛfkiː]

== Morphology and syntax ==
Root words may function as adjectives, nouns, verb or adverbs. In "Dutton Speedwords Dictionary" we read: "The English language, like most other natural languages, is inconsistent in having separate words for the adjective 'hot' and the noun 'heat' whereas the same word 'cold' can function as either a noun or an adjective according to its context. What applies to 'cold' can logically apply also to 'hot'; consequently the Speedword he denotes either 'heat' or 'hot', according to circumstance. ...

"Just as there is no distinction in English between the noun 'cold' and the adjective 'cold', so there is none between the adjective 'fast' and the adverb 'fast' (there being no English word 'fastly' corresponding to 'slowly'). What applies to the adjective 'fast' can logically apply also to other qualifiers, and consequently, there is no necessity to differentiate between, say, 'beautiful' and 'beautifully'. This means that, in international correspondence, the Speedword bel can convey not only 'beauty' and 'beautiful' ... but 'beautifully' as well ...

"Verbs and nouns are similarly interchangeable, for in the same way that each of the English words 'work', 'answer' and 'praise' can function either as a verb or noun according to its environment, so can any other word have a dual role. In English the noun form of the verb 'fail' is 'failure', and of 'pay' 'payment'; but in everyday expressions such as 'without fail' and 'in his pay' the unnecessary distinction has been eliminated ... the Speedword [sic? or speeedwords] policy is to cut the Gordian knot and make pa mean either 'pay' or 'payment', pre either 'prepare' or 'preparation', kok 'cook' or 'cookery', men 'remember' to 'memory', and so on throughout."

There are, however, grammatical affixes pertinent to particular parts of speech.

=== Verb affixes ===
The present tense is unmarked, e.g. j spe [ʒə 'speː] "I speak". The past is marked by the unstressed prefix y- [ai̯], e.g. j yspe [ʒi ai̯'speː] "I spoke".

Two verbs are irregular:

- to be: e [eː] "be, am. is, are"; y [joː] "was, were".
- to have (perfect auxiliary): h (post-1951 pronunciation unknown) "has, have"; hy [hai̯] "had".

The unmarked form also serves as the infinitive, e.g.sh am spe [ʃi'am 'speː] "she loves to speak"

There are two participles:

Present participle has prefix u- [ʊŋ], e.g. uspe [ʊŋ'speː] "speaking"
Perfect participle has suffix -d [d, ɛd], e.g. sped [speːd] "spoken"

Only one irregular verb: the present participle of the auxiliary h is hu [hʊŋ]

Note: Dutton is quite clear that the prefix u forms a participle, i.e. a verbal adjective, e.g. u uspe tem [uː ʊŋ'speː tem] 'a speaking clock', l ura on [li ʊŋ'raː 'ɔn] "the working man." Indeed, he devotes five paragraphs to hammer this point home.

Dutton devotes six paragraphs to hammer home the difference between the English gerund (verbal noun) and the present participle. He is adamant that forms prefixed with u- may be used only as a present participle. In Speedwords the gerund must be expressed by the same form as the infinitive, i.e. the unmarked verb, e.g. g amt spe [ɡi 'amt speːd "they like speaking", gi ko & go [ɡiː 'koː and 'goː] "their coming and going"

Furthermore

the continuous tenses are formed with "to be" and the unmarked verb, e.g. s e ri [si 'eː 'riː] "he is writing"; w y ri [wə 'joː 'riː] "we were writing".
the perfect tenses are formed with the auxiliary h and the unmarked verb, e.g. s h ri "he has written"; g hy spe "they had spoken".

=== Noun affixes ===
The plural, where necessary, is shown by the suffix -z, e.g. femz ['fɛməz] "women". Dutton is emphatic that if it is clear from context that the noun must be plural, the ending -z is not used, e.g. ud fem [ʊd 'fɛm] "many women"; cz on [tʃəz 'ɔn]

In the pre-1951 version of Speedwords, the possessive of nouns is [zai̯], and written with an apostrophe, e.g. l fem' ryg lə 'fɛmzai̯ 'rai̯ɡ] "the woman's house"; but in 1951, Dutton introduced a new root word zy [zai̯] meaning "disease". It is very unlikely that Dutton would have retained the apostrophe with the same sound. But we do not know what he subsequently did.

=== Adjective/ Adverb affixes ===
me- [ˈmeː] comparative, more, -er (< me greater, increase, more), e.g. mebel [meː'bɛl] "more beautiful(ly)"
my- [ˈmai̯] superlative, most, -est (< my most), e.g. mybel [mai̯ː'bɛl] "most beautiful(ly)"

=== Word Formative Suffixes ===
-a [(j)aː] unfavourable
-b [b, ɪb] possibility, -ible, -able (< ib possible)
-c [tʃoː] collection (< co collect, collection)
-e [(j)eː] augmentative
-f [f] causative (after a vowel) (< fy cause, make, reason, render)
-g [ɡ, ɪɡ] (an idea having a general relationship to the root) (< ig general)
-i [iː] association (after a consonant), possessive on pronouns
-k [k, ɪk] quality, -ic (< ik property, quality)
-l [l, ɪl] (an idea having a special relationship to the root) (< il particular, special, especial)
-m [m, ɔm] thing (< om article, object, thing)
-n [(j)ʊn] negative, -less, in-, un- (< un negative)
-o [oː] contrary, opposite (after a consonant)
-p [p, ɛp] place (< ep location, place, position, put, set)
-r [r, ər, jɛr] person, agent, -er (< er person)
-s [s, ɪs] (an idea having a complementary relationship to the root) (< is complement)
-t [t, ɛt] diminutive, -ette (< et little, small)
-u [(j)uː] favorable
-v [v] association (after a vowel)
-x [ks] contrary, opposite (after a vowel)
-y [ai̯] causative (after a consonant) (< fy cause, make, reason, render)
-z [z, əz] plural, -s
-st [ɪst] professional, -ist (< ist professional)

In "Dutton World Speedwords" we are given the 'indefinite preposition' iv. But it is clear from Dutton's entry that the affixes -i and -v are not derived from this preposition but rather that the preposition is a backformation from the affixes.

Dutton says [words in italics were written as italicized speedwords in the original]: "The prepositions 'at', 'on', 'by', 'under', etc. are sometimes used to convey a somewhat loose idea of association without any definite idea of position, as in 'at the most', 'by the way', 'on business', 'under difficulties', etc. When, therefore, any preposition is not literally applicable, the Speedword 'iv' is used. This Speedword consists of the two association suffixes 'i-' and '-v' and hence appropriately conveys the idea of association without definite sense of place."

=== Interfixes (not written) ===
- [ŋ, ɪŋ] two-root compound
- [ʃ, ɪʃ] three-root compound

For examples see Compound words in the 'Phonology and orthography' section above.

== Potential improvements to Speedwords ==
There are three potential improvements to Speedwords which would overcoming ambiguities, remove omissions or deficiencies, and overcome confusion. These were discussed.

A major ambiguity is terminological. Dutton uses three terms interchangeably in TYDS. They are 'parent word', 'radical', 'word-root', and 'word family'. He sometimes uses them identically, to mean the stem, that is an indivisible element. At other times he means the indivisible element plus prefix or suffix or the compounds of indivisible elements. By doing so he lacks the ability to distinguish between them. It would be much simpler to reserve the three terms for the indivisible element and then use the term "extension" for the addition of prefix or suffix. "Compound" would retain its existing usage. Even more confusingly he adds another term 'word familities'. It is not clear whether this refers to the indivisible element plus all its prefixes and suffixes. Dutton also refers to "keywords" meaning the basic or essential stem words to which prefixes and suffixes are added. So, this means there is ambiguity for the learner on what is the basic vocabulary of Speedwords. Some further research is underway to see if this can be clarified.

There is an obvious omission and deficiency. These could have easily been rectified by Dutton using his personal knowledge and included in an expanded TYDS edition.

The major omission is a description of his rationale behind formulating the Speedwords he has chosen. In his opening chapter of all editions of Teach Yourself Dutton Speedwords titled "Dutton Speedwords Analysed" he describes some of the principles he used. For example, using Horn's analysis of frequently used words to determine how much to abbreviate or truncate his Speedword vocabulary, and, drawing on words common to several European languages. But this does not equate to a systematic account of how new technical words and expressions could be added to the Speedword vocabulary. Nor does it show that the existing Speedwords were wisely chosen.

The major deficiencies arise from overcoming confusion caused by apparent inconsistencies in understanding what is meant by particular Speedwords given the variety of Speedword formation methods available. There are four possible areas of confusion. First, deciphering the meaning of a Speedword can produce several possible candidate meanings. There are 20 suffixes. The practice of incorporating a Speedword suffix into the Speedword meakes it difficult to decide whether a Speedword is either a Speedword stem (that is, an indivisible element) or a Speedword and a suffix. For example, the Speedword 'de' is day, 'deb' is debt but 'debe' is yesterday. The suffix 'e' is an augmentive signalling a comparative increase. So, an untutored interpretation would suggest that 'debe' is a large debt. Dutton's answer to this objection is that they need to be learnt. Second, contractions of frequently used Speedwords actually multiply the vocabulary by creating new Speedwords. For example, 'debe' yesterday is shortened to 'db', and 'jecen' percent is shortened to 'jc'. Again, Dutton's answer to this objection is that they need to be learnt. Third, there are some puzzling inconsistencies. For example, 'La' is great, 'Mla' is greater. 'M' is also used as an abbreviation for 'Mr'. It is unclear whether this is a misprint with the L in lower case and what the 'm' signifies. Finally, Dutton encourages joining Speedwords together as compounds except where they are equivalent to an existing Speedword. This creates new Speedwords which become unrecognisable because they are not in the dictionary, Again, Dutton's answer to this objection is that they need to be learnt. The disadvantage is it increases the vocabulary reducing the benefit from keeping the vocabulary small.

In summary, these shortcomings are resolvable. Ambiguity could be resolved by obtaining a copy of the Speedwords publication which lists the 493 elementary Speedwords but this is unobtainable. It may also contain the rationale for formulating Speedwords. The deficiencies should be addressed differently. Instead of immediately changing some Speedwords, the system of affixes (prefix, suffix) need to be re-examined. The number of prefixes should be reduced. Some overlap e.g., augmentation, and favourable. The complement suffix denote an incorrect pair or is out of sequence for example, 'ze' means send but 'zes' is bring. The diminutive suffix does not convey magnitude, for example, 'do' for live, while 'dot' is visit). The use of a prefix conceals the Speedword because the first letter cannot be immediately recognised. These proposals would make Speedwords more easily recognisable because the elementary stem would be reliably recognisable. Apparently in the 1980s and 1990s some attempts were made to amend Speedword shortcomings but they are no longer available for inspection and evaluation. Improvements depend upon reading Dutton publications from 1933 and 1951 which may disclose method and rationale.
