= Personal Shorthand =

Alphabetic shorthand

Personal Shorthand (Briefhand)
- Script type: printed alphabetical shorthand
- Creator: Carl W. Salser, C. Theo Yerian, and Mark R. Salser
- Period: 1950s-present
- Languages: English

ISO 15924
- ISO 15924: Latn (215), Latin

Unicode
- Unicode alias: Latin
- Unicode range: Basic Latin

Personal Shorthand, originally known as Briefhand in the 1950s, is a completely alphabetic shorthand.

There are three basic categories of written shorthand. Best known are pure symbol (stenographic) shorthand systems (e.g., Gregg, Pitman). Because the complexity of symbol shorthands made them time-consuming to learn, a variety of newer alphabetic shorthands was created, with the goal of being easier to learn– e.g., Speedwriting, Stenoscript, Stenospeed, and Forkner shorthand. These systems used normally written letters of the alphabet, but also some number of symbols, alphabetic characters changed in shape or position, or special marks for punctuation and so they are more accurately described as hybrid shorthand systems. In contrast, Personal Shorthand uses only the 26 letters of the alphabet, without any special symbols, positioning, or punctuation, and it can therefore be written cursively, printed, typed, or even entered in a computer without special typefaces or graphics.

Given years of practice, symbol shorthand writers could sometimes acquire skills of 150 or even 200 words per minute, which might have qualified them for demanding positions such as court reporting typically dominated today by machine shorthands. Due to the extensive time necessary, few achieved such a level. Most symbol shorthand writers in secretarial positions wrote between 80 and 140 words per minute. Hybrid shorthand systems with higher symbol content generally could be written faster than those with fewer symbols. In common with most hybrid shorthands, Personal Shorthand cannot be written as fast as symbol shorthands. However, like some hybrids, learning time is drastically reduced. Students of Personal Shorthand can acquire a useful shorthand skill (50 to 60 wpm) in a single school term, compared to the year or more for symbol system students to reach that same level.

Without the complexity of symbols to memorize and practice writing, Personal Shorthand theory is relatively simple. There are six Theory Rules. Slightly more than a hundred high-frequency business vocabulary words are represented by a single written letter known as a Brief Form ("a" for "about", "t" for "time", "v" for "very", etc.). High-frequency letter groupings within words ("g" for "-ing", "s" for "-tion", etc.), known as Phonetic Abbreviations, are also written with a single letter. In most Personal Shorthand textbooks, the entire Theory is presented in just ten lessons, after which review and practice can lead to writing speeds of 60 to 100 words per minute.

Authors of the contemporary version of Personal Shorthand are Carl W. Salser, C. Theo Yerian, and Mark R. Salser.
