= Forkner shorthand =

Alphabetic shorthand created by Hamden L. Forkner

- Script type: script alphabetic shorthand
- Creator: Hamden L. Forkner
- Published: 1955

Forkner Shorthand is an alphabetic shorthand created by Hamden L. Forkner and first published in 1955. Its popularity grew through the 1980s as those who needed shorthand every day (such as secretaries) began to favor the easier learning curve of alphabetic systems to the more difficult (but potentially faster) symbol-based ones. Forkner was taught in high-schools and colleges throughout North America along with comparable shorthands such as AlphaHand, Speedwriting, Stenoscript and Personal Shorthand.

== Writing ==
Forkner is written with a handful of special symbols mixed with simplified versions of cursive longhand letters. A long horizontal stroke replaces m and a curved line stands for ing. The letters used are almost exclusively lower-case, written from left to right and joined in a standard cursive hand. Capital letters are used for special purposes; a detached T stands for the prefix trans- and the upper-case S represents s followed by t.

=== Vowels ===
The way Forkner represents vowels may be unique among alphabetic systems. Instead of using only ordinary cursive forms, the vowels a/o/u and short i are reduced to dots and apostrophe-like strokes and ticks, mostly written after the body of word has been made. These vowel marks can be omitted if the writer feels they are unnecessary since many words are legible without their vowels.

Ordinary cursive vowels are reserved for long e, for diphthongs (e.g., o for ow/ou), or as affixes (e.g. u for under-). The "long i" diphthong is written as a dotless cursive i, for example, fine becomes fın.

While consonants are written phonetically, vowels generally reflect their original spelling. Forkner's symbol for a might express any of the sounds represented by a in English words such as cat, father, ago, day. The oo sounds in too and book are represented by the u symbol. The short e sound is simply omitted: less becomes ls.

=== Abbreviations and phrasing ===
Forkner makes use of several standard shorthand features to gain additional speed: brief forms, common abbreviations, and phrasing. Brief forms are essentially shortened versions of frequent words or words potentially encountered in business letters. They are not always immediately transparent to the untrained reader, such as Db for distribute. The more commonly known abbreviations, like those for the days of the week, are also used in Forkner.

The shorter brief forms (one or two letters) that follow each other in a sentence are joined together as though they were one word; this is known as phrasing. Those familiar with Gregg or Pitman Shorthand will recognize this feature: operating on the philosophy that the time taken to repeatedly lift the pen between short words is wasted, the words in a group such as "will you be able" are compacted into one word. Though it may sound confusing, it is always clear to the transcriber what is meant, both through context and the words most commonly found in phrases, such as "all" (l), "of" (v), "the" (–), "please" (p), "be" (b), etc.

=== Punctuation ===
Punctuation is fairly similar to the ordinary longhand equivalents. A period is a dot and a question mark is simply ? without the dot. New paragraphs are indicated with double diagonal strokes //. Capitalized words, such as names, are indicated by a small check-mark placed under the word.

== Learning curve and writing speed ==
Students can begin adding Forkner shortcuts to their longhand writing as soon as they begin studying the system. One experienced shorthand instructor observed, "Students get instant satisfaction because they can apply it from the beginning." This reportedly resulted in fewer students giving up on Forkner compared to other shorthand systems. One teacher told a reporter, "The highest dropout rate in the Vancouver school system is in traditional shorthand courses, yet I have never had a dropout in Forkner."

Reports from shorthand instructors indicated results such as the following: an average student can achieve 50 words per minute after a 30-hour course; most of the students who took a 9-month course in high school reached or surpassed a goal of 60 wpm; in an experimental class taught at Chester High School (Pennsylvania), some students were able to write 100 words per minute after three months of intensive training.

Forkner shorthand's relative ease of learning was investigated in several academic dissertations and theses.

== History ==
Dr. Forkner was a professor of business education at Columbia University when he began designing and testing his shorthand system. In 1955 he established the Forkner Publishing Company and issued its first book, Forkner alphabet shorthand: A scientific high-speed system of writing: the only system of shorthand that combines the best features of symbol systems with easily written longhand letters. He promoted his system at teachers' conferences and helped organize some adult education classes.

In 1963 an experimental class at a Vancouver high school was successful and the school district implemented the course in 10 additional schools in September 1964. Larry Oszust, the instructor of the trial class, told a newspaper that his students had made as much progress in one year of Forkner classes as they would have made in two years of Gregg or Pitman training. From that starting point, Forkner gradually spread through high schools and universities in Canada and the US, competing with other shorthand systems.

In the 1980s public interest in handwritten shorthand evaporated. Fewer and fewer schools in North America offered shorthand classes. The publication of Forkner-related books concluded in 1991 when Nelson Canada printed the final run of the Forkner Shorthand Dictionary. Manuals and dictionaries are still readily available on auction and second-hand book sites.

== See also ==
- Briefhand/Personal Shorthand
- Gregg Shorthand
- Pitman Shorthand
- Shorthand
- Speedwriting
- Stenoscript
- Teeline
