= Current Shorthand =

- Script type: semi-script abjad Stenography
- Creator: Henry Sweet
- Period: 1892
- Languages: English

Current Shorthand was developed beginning in 1884 and published in 1892 by Dr. Henry Sweet. It shares some similarities with the Gregg system, with which Current is contemporary. It uses more ink than classical systems, and whether or not it is fit like them for sustained verbatim reporting has never been established.

== History and attributes ==
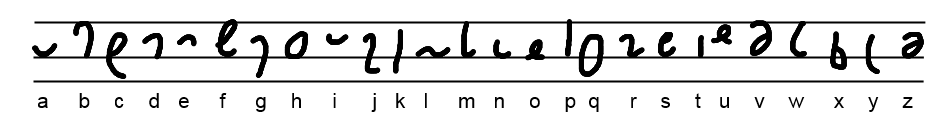
The symbols in orthographic Current shorthand. The system does not need lines but are added in this image to show their positions.

Sweet wished to produce a shorthand system which could replace longhand in most situations. For this reason Sweet proceeded to develop a shorthand which is a pure script which is easily written with any slant comfortable yet does not sacrifice legibility.

The system has two styles: orthographic and phonetic. The orthographic style is based on traditional English spelling, and so is easier to learn but slower to write. The phonetic style is based on the sounds of spoken language, and may be used for greater brevity. If the writer wishes, the two styles may be intermixed. Vowels are attached to the consonants and can, therefore, be omitted; the script is linear, like longhand, and can be easily adapted for use in printing.

== Reception ==
There is little evidence that Current Shorthand was publicly successful. George Bernard Shaw wrote in Pygmalion that the system's fatal flaw was Sweet's indifference to business, as well as the already established infrastructure of Pitman shorthand.
