= Reginald J. G. Dutton =

British stenographer (1886–1970)

Reginald John Garfield Dutton (8 November 1886 – 23 June 1970) was the inventor of the auxiliary language and stenographic system known as Dutton Speedwords. Dutton was born in Nottingham, England and was the eldest son of George H. J. Dutton. In 1890, when Dutton was three or four, his family moved to Skegness so George could work as a phrenologist and bookseller.

Dutton studied Pitman Shorthand and other shorthand systems as an aid to his work as a newspaper correspondent. He invented his own system, published in 1916 under the title "Shorthand in Three Days". He made minor improvements but settled on a final form by 1919, republishing his work as "Dutton One Week Shorthand" as the 12 lessons could be mastered in one week.

Dutton became interested in Esperanto and, in general, the concept of an auxiliary constructed language in the interests of increasing communication and goodwill among peoples. He set about creating his own auxiliary language, based on his earlier shorthand system, and in 1943 introduced "World Speedwords" (now Dutton Speedwords), conceived as a system of shorthand as well as a spoken and written auxiliary language.

Dutton was a Fellow of the Royal Society of Arts from 1918 to 1969.

His mail-order self-education course in Dutton Speedwords was continued by his daughter Elizabeth after his death in Skegness on 23 June 1970.

== Sources and external links ==
- "Biographical Notes on Reginald J. G. Dutton". Yahoo! GeoCities. Archived from the original on 19 October 2009.
