= Hamden L. Forkner =

American educator and writer

Hamden Landon Forkner, Sr. (March 10, 1897 – November 25, 1975) was an American educator and writer who created Future Business Leaders of America, an educational organization for high school and college students, and developed the Forkner shorthand system for taking dictation.

== Life and career ==
Forkner was born on March 10, 1897, to Allen F. Forkner and Lucy Adline Irvine.

He graduated from the University of California at Berkeley and was a professor of education at the Teachers College at Columbia University, where he developed the concept of what would become the Future Business Leaders of America.

As an author, Forkner wrote the books “20th Century Bookkeeping & Accounting” (1940, co-authored with Alva Leroy Prickett), “Correlated Dictation and Transcription: Pitman Edition” (1946, co-authored with Agnes E. Osborne and James E. O’Brien), “Developing a Curriculum for Modern Living (1954, co-authored with Florence B. Stratmeyer), and “Study Guide for Forkner Shorthand” (1965, co-authored with Jean G. Hanna and published by his Forkner Publishing Company).

He died at his home in New York City on November 13, 1975, at the age of 78.
