= FBLA =

American career and technical student organization

Future Business Leaders of America, Inc.
- Abbreviation: FBLA
- Formation: 1942; 84 years ago, FBLA High School; 1958; 68 years ago, FBLA Collegiate; 1979; 47 years ago, FBLA Network; 1994; 32 years ago, FBLA Middle School
- Founder: Hamden L. Forkner
- Founded at: Johnson City, Tennessee, U.S.
- Type: Career and technical student organization (CTSO)
- Legal status: 501(c)3 Non-profit Organization
- Headquarters: National Center Headquarters; 12100 Sunset Hill Road, Suite 200; Reston, Virginia, U.S. 20190
- Members: Total membership: 210,947: FBLA High School: 187,089; FBLA Middle School: 19,959; FBLA Collegiate: 3,899; (Membership numbers as of 7/31/25) (2025)
- President & CEO: Jennifer Woods
- Website: fbla.org
- Formerly called: Future Business Leaders of America-Phi Beta Lambda, Inc.

The Future Business Leaders of America, or FBLA, is a career and technical student organization (CTSO) headquartered in Reston, Virginia. Established in 1942, FBLA is a non-profit organization that prepares students for an occupation in business. With more than 200,000 middle school (FBLA Middle School), high school (FBLA High School), and college (FBLA Collegiate) members, FBLA provides student members with opportunities to explore careers, develop leadership skills, and gain real-world business experience.

== History ==
The concept of FBLA was created by Hamden L. Forkner Sr. of Columbia University in 1937. The National Council for Business Education recognized FBLA in 1940, and the first high school chapter was founded on February 3, 1942.

In 1997, the first president and CEO of the FBLA, Edward Miller, retired. FBLA raised $350,000 for March of Dimes in 2011.

FBLA's National Leadership Conference's (NLC's) has taken place at many venues nationally, bringing students from all over the United States.

As of 2024, FBLA's national charity partner is the Alzheimer's Association. Their previous partner was March of Dimes.

The upcoming 2027 edition is planned for Columbus, Ohio.

*The list below details all NLC's from the years,1999-2029. Please note that all NLC's before then are not listed.

Year	Host	Format
1999	Chicago, Illinois	On-site
2000	Long Beach, California	On-site
2001	Orlando, Florida	On-site
2002	Nashville, Tennessee	On-site
2003	Dallas, Texas	On-site
2004	Denver, Colorado	On-site
2005	Orlando, Florida	On-site
2006	Nashville, Tennessee	On-site
2007	Chicago, Illinois	On-site
2008	Atlanta, Georgia	On-site
2009	Anaheim, California	On-site
2010	Nashville, Tennessee	On-site
2011	Orlando, Florida	On-site
2012	San Antonio, Texas	On-site
2013	Anaheim, California	On-site
2014	Nashville, Tennessee	On-site
2015	Chicago, Illinois	On-site
2016	Atlanta, Georgia	On-site
2017	Anaheim, California	On-site
2018	Baltimore, Maryland	On-site
2019	San Antonio, Texas	On-site
2020	Virtual / National Leadership Experience	Virtual
2021	Virtual / National Leadership Experience	Virtual
2022	Chicago, Illinois	On-site
2023	Atlanta, Georgia	On-site
2024	Orlando, Florida	On-site
2025	Anaheim, California	On-site
2026	San Antonio, Texas	On-site
Upcoming Conferences
2027	Columbus, Ohio	On-site
2028	Anaheim, California	On-site
2029	Indianapolis, Indiana	On-site

== Governance ==
The organization is governed by its board of directors, which consists of the CEO, business leaders, state educators, business education teachers, and the two division national presidents.

FBLA Middle School and FBLA High School divide the United States into five administrative regions through the 2025-26 membership year. These regions are Western, Mountain Plains, North Central, Southern, and Eastern. Starting with the 2026-27 membership year, the four administrative regions are Eastern, Southern, Central, and Western.

FBLA is governed by a structured set of bylaws that ensure consistent oversight and clear accountability across the organization. The FBLA Board of Directors operates under corporate bylaws that define its authority, responsibilities, and governance practices. In addition, each division of FBLA is governed by its own division bylaws, which outline division-specific policies, leadership structures, and operational procedures. Together, these bylaws provide a comprehensive governance framework that supports FBLA’s mission and organizational integrity at all levels.

Each state has what is called a state chapter, which has its own state officer team. The roles in each state officer team vary by state, but each usually consists of a president, vice president, secretary, treasurer, and parliamentarian. Some also have historians, webmasters, and reporters.

== Structure ==
FBLA is composed of three divisions: FBLA Middle School, FBLA High School, and FBLA Collegiate. Each division except for FBLA Middle School (the FBLA High School National Officers also represent FBLA Middle School) has their own National Officer team. Most states have an FBLA High School and FBLA Collegiate state officer team. Some states have FBLA Middle School state officer teams. The entire organization contains more than 200,000 members across the three divisions.

=== FBLA Middle School ===
FBLA's Middle School division introduces middle/junior high school students to the world of business. Members can explore careers and research into types of businesses.

=== FBLA High School ===
FBLA High School is the largest division of FBLA. FBLA High School is separated into four regions: Eastern, Southern, Central, and Western. To charter an FBLA state chapter, a state must have at least five local chapters. Currently, the states of Georgia, Pennsylvania, and Missouri have the largest membership. Georgia has the largest chapter.

=== FBLA Collegiate ===
FBLA Collegiate, formerly known as Phi Beta Lambda, is the collegiate division of FBLA. FBLA Collegiate can be found in traditional four-year colleges, community colleges, and career training programs. FBLA Collegiate has its own National Leadership Conference (NLC) before FBLA Middle School and FBLA High School's NLC. To charter an FBLA Collegiate state chapter, a state must have at least three local chapters.

== Competition ==
Competitions are offered for topics such as Accounting, Finance, Economics, Healthcare, Leadership, Law, Technology, Business, and Marketing. Students compete at the state level, the winners of which can compete at the National Leadership Conference. States can chose the events offered at the state and regional level. Each event has its own guidelines and rubric. There are events that one can compete in as an individual, team, or chapter team. The top 10 finalists at the National Leadership Conference are acknowledged.

== National Officers ==
FBLA High School elects its national officers, with the exception of the parliamentarian who is appointed, and FBLA Collegiate elects its six national officers at each summer's national leadership conference. National officers are responsible for representing the entire membership as well as designing and implementing the annual program of work to achieve FBLA's goals. Each national officer team serves for a one-year term. National officers also are assisted by a team of 5 members on a 'National Council' representing their position.
