= Shorthand =

Abbreviated symbolic writing method

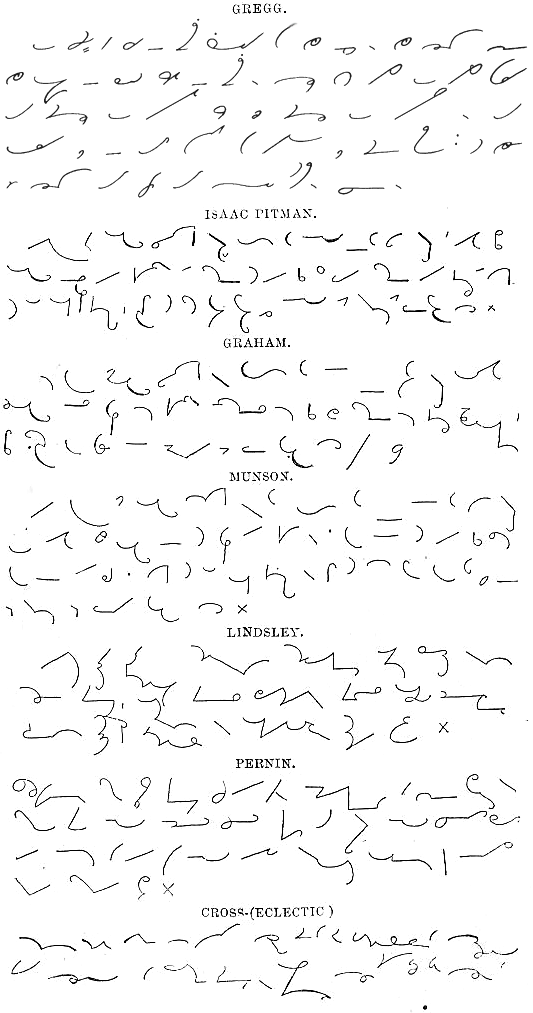
The Lord's Prayer in Gregg and a variety of 19th-century systems

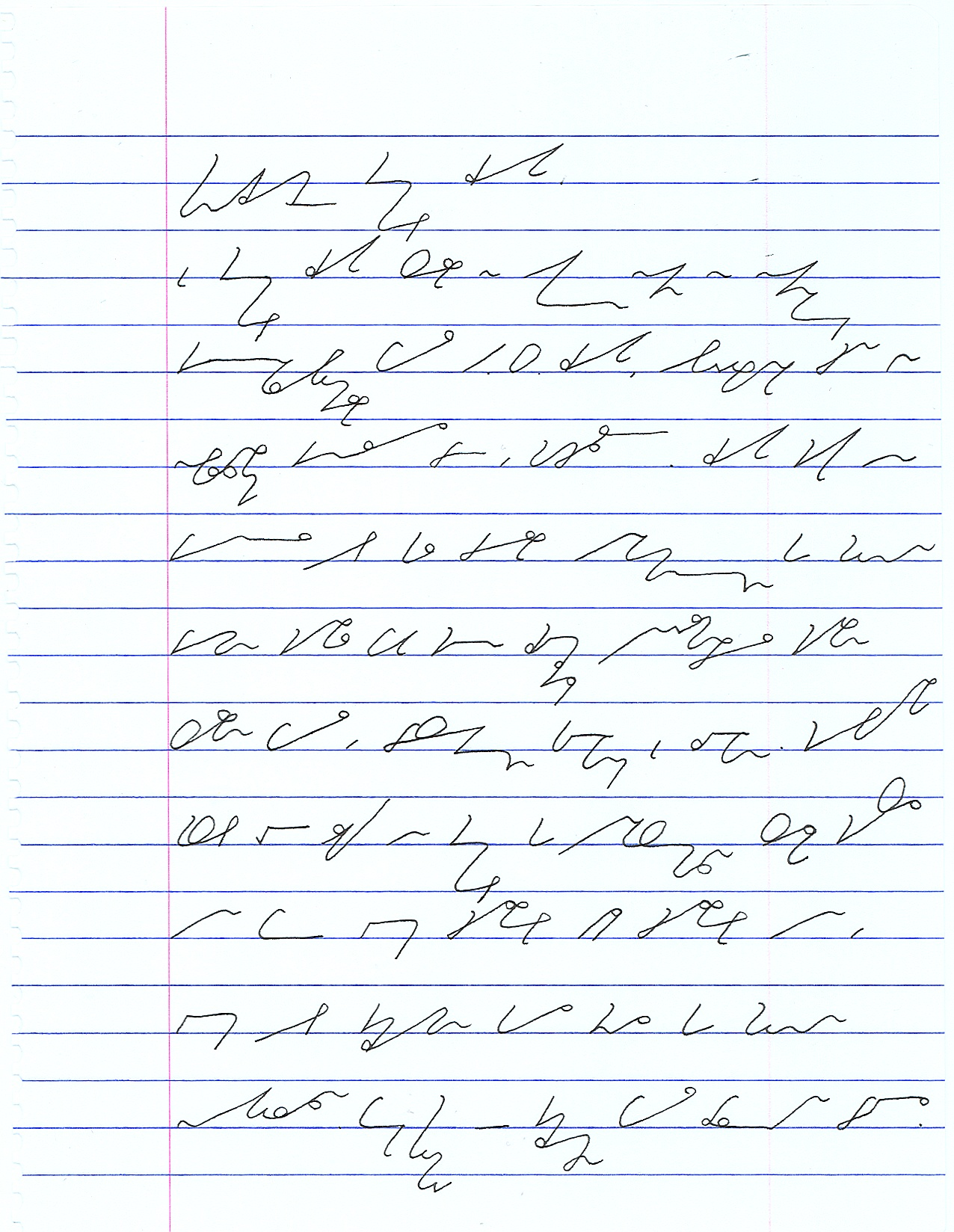
Dutch stenography using the "System Groote"

Shorthand is an abbreviated symbolic writing method that increases speed and brevity of writing as compared to longhand, a more common method of writing a language. The process of writing in shorthand is called stenography, from the Greek stenos (narrow) and graphein (to write). It has also been called brachygraphy, from Greek brachys (short), and tachygraphy, from Greek tachys (swift, speedy), depending on whether compression or speed of writing is the goal.

Many forms of shorthand exist. A typical shorthand system provides symbols or abbreviations for words and common phrases, which can allow someone well-trained in the system to write as quickly as people speak. Abbreviation methods are alphabet-based and use different abbreviating approaches. Many journalists use shorthand writing for quickly taking notes. Shorthand is also commonly used in stenographic training programmes and skill-based transcription examinations that require candidates to record dictated speech accurately within a limited time. In computerized settings, several autocomplete programs, standalone or integrated in text editors, based on word lists, also include a shorthand function for frequently used phrases. In educational contexts, structured dictation practice is often used to improve shorthand writing speed and listening accuracy.

Shorthand was used more widely in the past, before the invention of recording and dictation machines. Shorthand was considered an essential part of secretarial training and police work and was useful for journalists. Although the primary use of shorthand has been to record oral dictation and other types of verbal communication, some systems are used for compact expression. For example, healthcare professionals might use shorthand notes in medical charts and correspondence. Shorthand notes were typically temporary, intended either for immediate use or for later typing, data entry, or (mainly historically) transcription to longhand. Longer-term uses do exist, such as encipherment; diaries (like that of Samuel Pepys) are a common example.

== History ==
=== Classical antiquity ===
The earliest known indication of shorthand systems is from the Parthenon in Ancient Greece, where a mid-4th century BC inscribed marble slab was found. This shows a writing system primarily based on vowels, using certain modifications to indicate consonants. Hellenistic tachygraphy is reported from the 2nd century BC onwards, though there are indications that it might be older. The oldest datable reference is a contract from Middle Egypt, stating that Oxyrhynchos allows the "semeiographer" Apollonios two years to be taught shorthand writing. Hellenistic tachygraphy consisted of word stem signs and word ending signs. Over time, many syllabic signs were developed.

In Ancient Rome, Marcus Tullius Tiro (103–4 BC), a slave and later a freedman of Cicero, developed the Tironian notes so that he could write down Cicero's speeches. Plutarch (c. 46 – c. 120 AD) in his "Life of Cato the Younger" (95–46 BC) records that Cicero, during a trial of some insurrectionists in the senate, employed several expert rapid writers, whom he had taught to make figures comprising numerous words in a few short strokes, to preserve Cato's speech on this occasion. The Tironian notes consisted of Latin word stem abbreviations (notae) and of word ending abbreviations (titulae). The original Tironian notes consisted of about 4,000 signs, but new signs were introduced, so that their number increased to as many as 13,000. In order to have a less complex writing system, a syllabic shorthand script was sometimes used. After the decline of the Roman Empire, the Tironian notes were no longer used to transcribe speeches, though they were still known and taught, particularly during the Carolingian Renaissance. After the 11th century, however, they were mostly forgotten.

When many monastery libraries were secularized in the course of the 16th-century Protestant Reformation, long-forgotten manuscripts of Tironian notes were rediscovered.

=== Imperial China ===
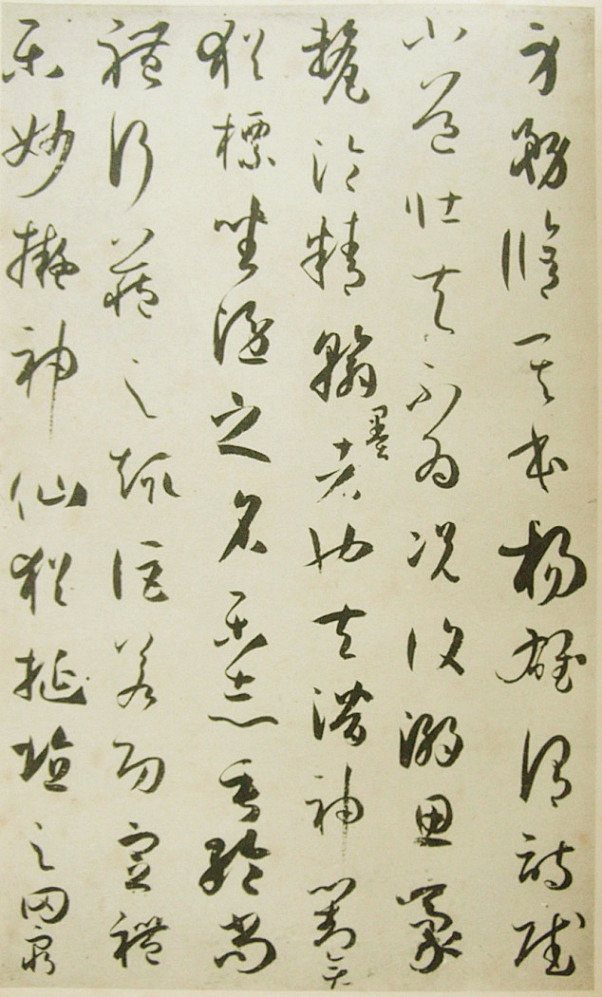
Sun Guoting's Treatise on Calligraphy, an example of cursive writing of Chinese characters

In imperial China, clerks used an abbreviated, highly cursive form of Chinese characters to record court proceedings and criminal confessions. These records were used to create more formal transcripts. One cornerstone of imperial court proceedings was that all confessions had to be acknowledged by the accused's signature, personal seal, or thumbprint, requiring fast writing. Versions of this technique survived in clerical professions into the modern day and, influenced by Western shorthand methods, some new methods were invented.

=== Europe and North America ===
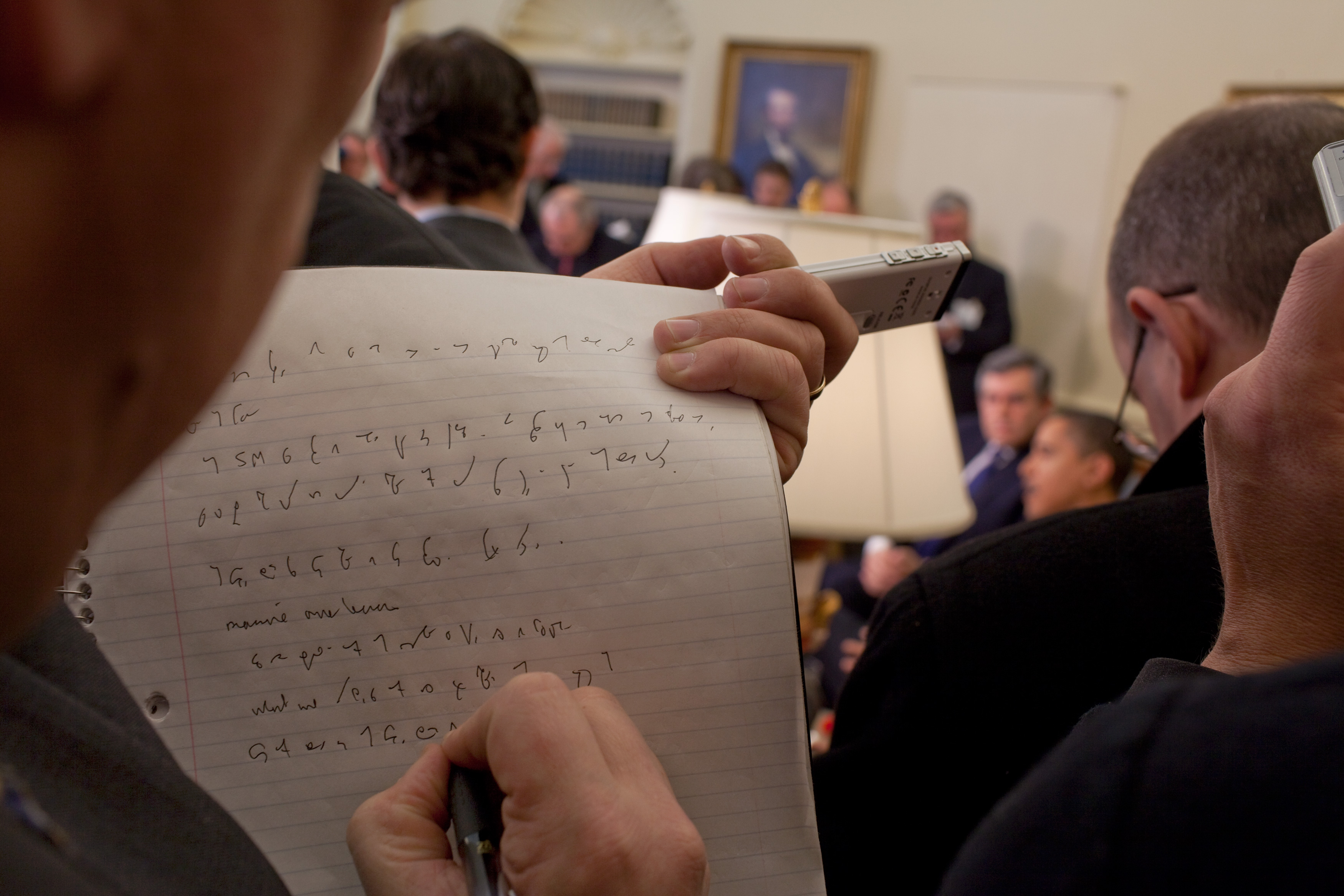
A reporter taking notes at the White House in shorthand, March 2009

An interest in shorthand or "short-writing" developed towards the end of the 16th century in England. In 1588, Timothy Bright published his Characterie; An Arte of Shorte, Swifte and Secrete Writing by Character which introduced a system with 500 arbitrary symbols each representing one word. Bright's book was followed by a number of others, including Peter Bales' The Writing Schoolemaster in 1590, John Willis's Art of Stenography in 1602, Edmond Willis's An abbreviation of writing by character in 1618, and Thomas Shelton's Short Writing in 1626 (later re-issued as Tachygraphy).

Shelton's system became very popular and is well known because it was used by Samuel Pepys for his diary and for many of his official papers, such as his letter copy books. It was also used by Isaac Newton in some of his notebooks. Shelton borrowed heavily from his predecessors, especially Edmond Willis. Each consonant was represented by an arbitrary but simple symbol, while the five vowels were represented by the relative positions of the surrounding consonants. Thus the symbol for B with symbol for T drawn directly above it represented "bat", while B with T below it meant "but"; top-right represented "e", middle-right "i", and lower-right "o". A vowel at the end of a word was represented by a dot in the appropriate position, while there were additional symbols for initial vowels. This basic system was supplemented by further symbols representing common prefixes and suffixes.

One drawback of Shelton's system was that there was no way to distinguish long and short vowels or diphthongs; so the b-a-t sequence could mean "bat", or "bait", or "bate", while b-o-t might mean "boot", or "bought", or "boat". The reader needed to use the context to work out which alternative was meant. The main advantage of the system was that it was easy to learn and to use. It was popular, and under the two titles of Short Writing and Tachygraphy, Shelton's book ran to more than 20 editions between 1626 and 1710.

Shelton's chief rivals were Theophilus Metcalfe's Stenography or Short Writing (1633) which was in its "55th edition" by 1721, and Jeremiah Rich's system of 1654, which was published under various titles including The penns dexterity compleated (1669). Rich's system was used by George Treby chairman of the House of Commons Committee of Secrecy investigating the Popish Plot. Another English shorthand system creator of the 17th century was William Mason (fl. 1672–1709) who published Arts Advancement in 1682.

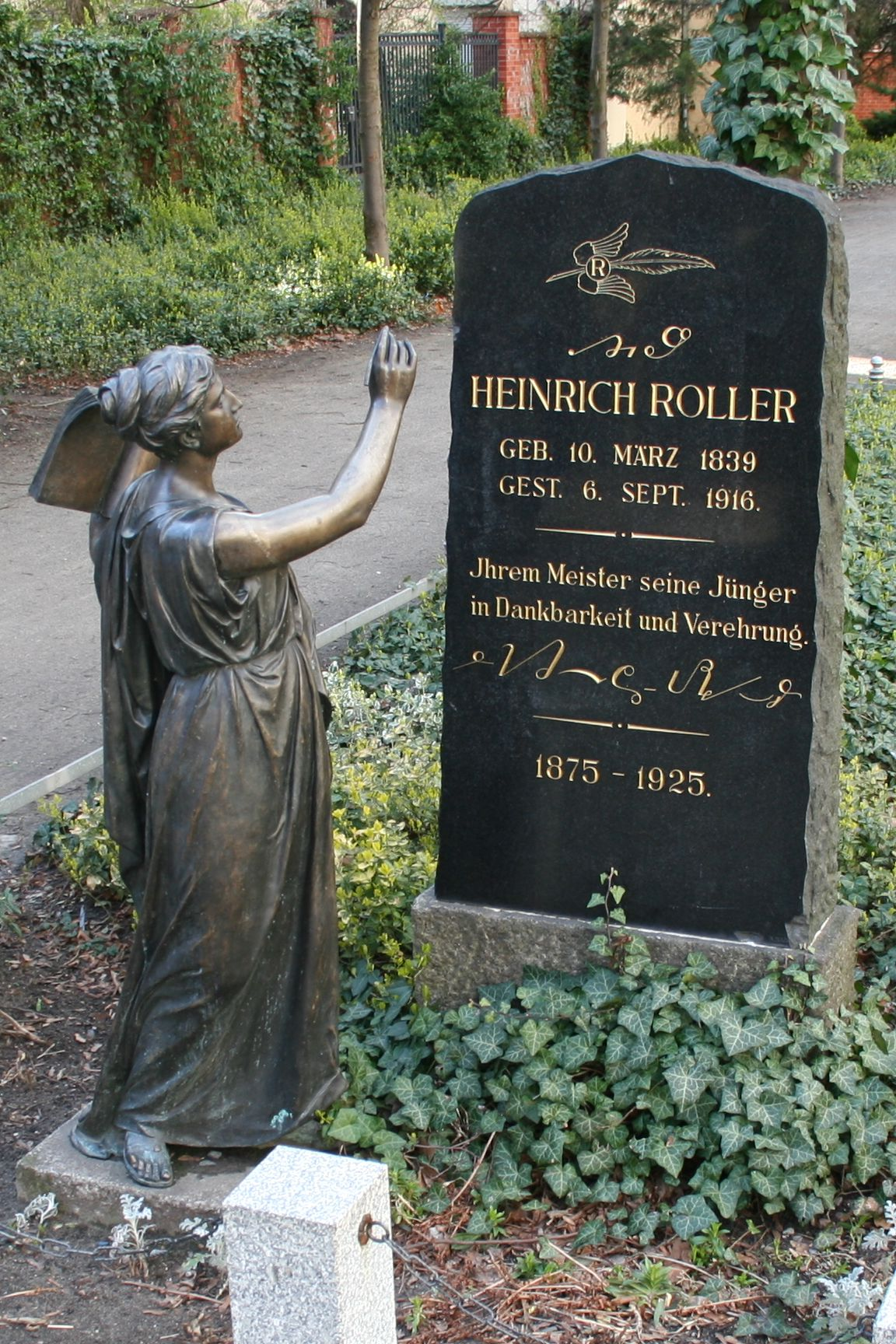
Tombstone of Heinrich Roller, inventor of a German shorthand system, with a sample of his shorthand

Modern-looking geometric shorthand was introduced with John Byrom's New Universal Shorthand of 1720. Samuel Taylor published a similar system in 1786, These shorthand systems later became widely used in administrative offices, parliamentary reporting, and stenographic training institutions in several English-speaking countries. Thomas Gurney published Brachygraphy in the mid-18th century. In 1834 in Germany, Franz Xaver Gabelsberger published his Gabelsberger shorthand. Gabelsberger based his shorthand on the shapes used in German cursive handwriting rather than on the geometrical shapes that were common in the English stenographic tradition.

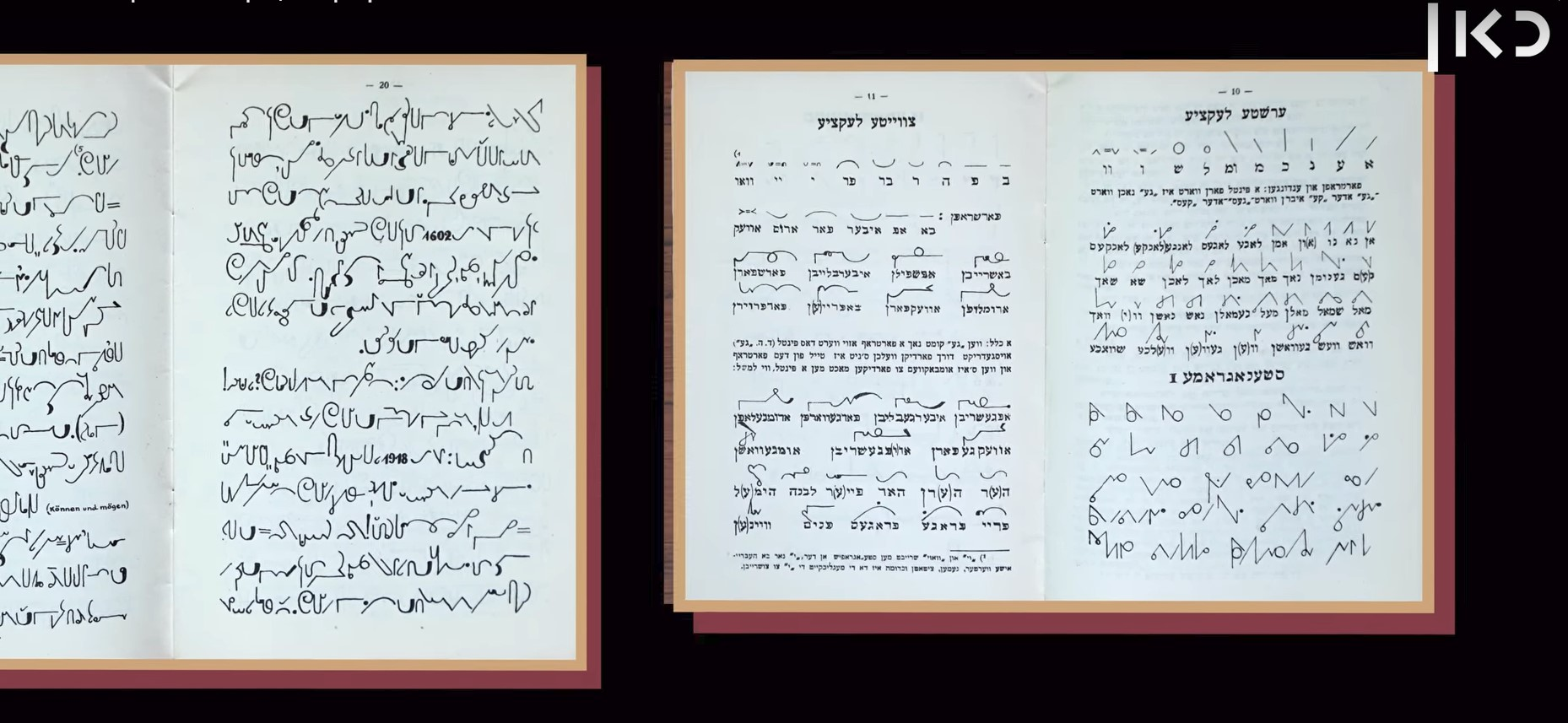
Yiddish shorthand

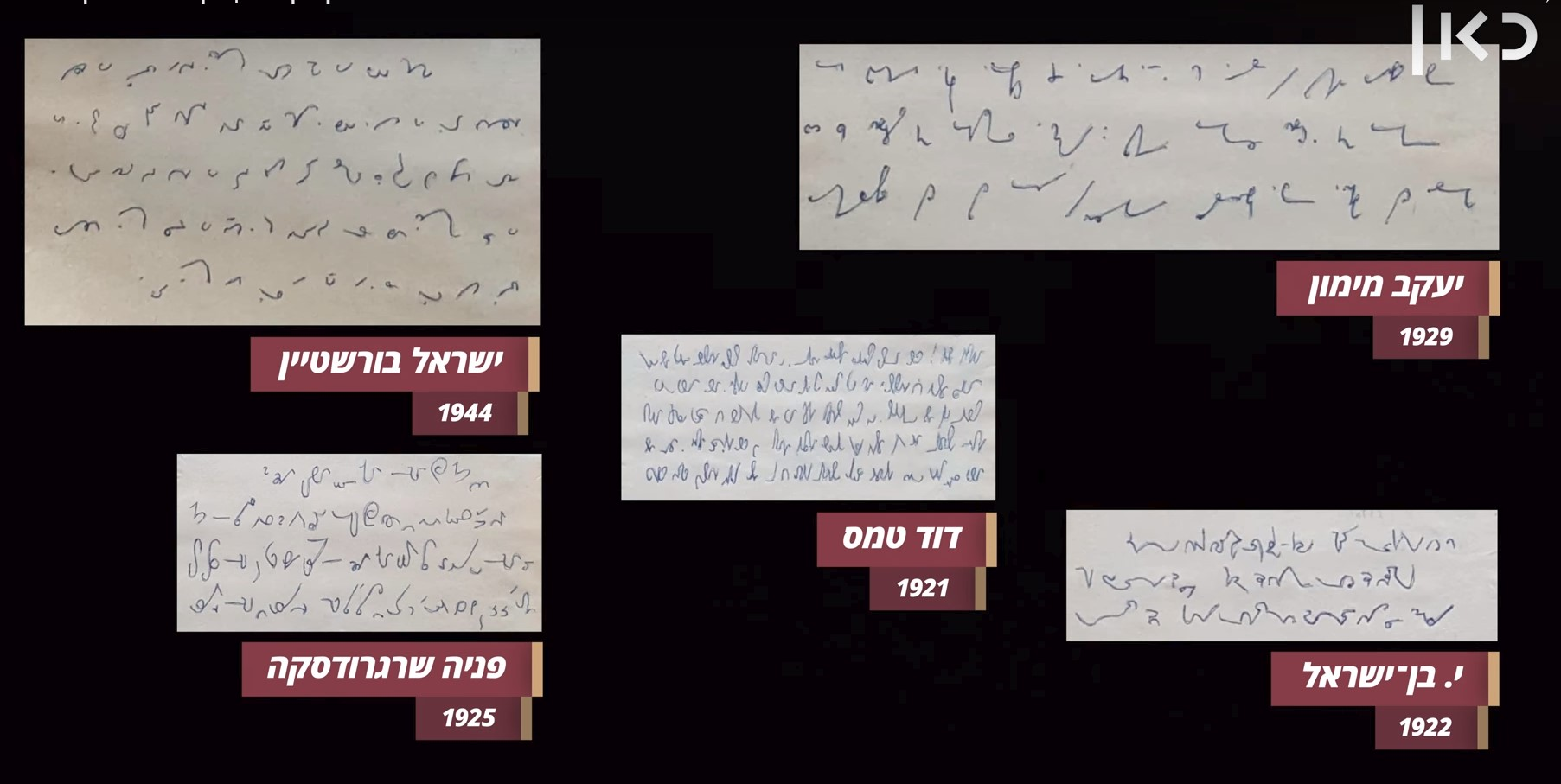
Hebrew shorthand

Taylor's system was superseded by Pitman shorthand, introduced in 1837 by English teacher Isaac Pitman, and improved many times since. Pitman's system uses a phonemic orthography. For this reason, it is sometimes known as phonography, meaning "sound writing" in Greek. One of the reasons this system allows fast transcription is that vowel sounds are optional when only consonants are needed to determine a word. The availability of a full range of vowel symbols, however, makes complete accuracy possible. Isaac's brother Benn Pitman, who lived in Cincinnati, Ohio, introduced the method to America. The record for fast writing with Pitman shorthand is 350 wpm during a two-minute test by Nathan Behrin in 1922.

In the United States and some other parts of the world, Pitman was largely superseded by Gregg shorthand, which was first published in 1888 by John Robert Gregg. This system was influenced by the handwriting shapes of Gabelsberger. Gregg's shorthand, like Pitman's, is phonetic, but has the simplicity of being "light-line". Pitman's system uses thick and thin strokes to distinguish related sounds, while Gregg's uses only thin strokes and makes some of the same distinctions by the length of the stroke. In fact, Gregg claimed joint authorship in another shorthand system published in pamphlet form by one Thomas Stratford Malone; Malone, however, claimed sole authorship and a legal battle ensued. The two systems use very similar, if not identical, symbols; however, these symbols represent different sounds. For instance, on page 10 of the manual is the word d i m 'dim'; however, in the Gregg system, the spelling would actually mean n u k or 'nook'.

Andrew J. Graham was a phonotypist during the period between the emergence of Pitman's and Gregg's systems. In 1854 he published a short-lived (only 9 issues) phonotypy journal called The Cosmotype, subtitled "devoted to that which will entertain usefully, instruct, and improve humanity", and several other monographs about phonography. In 1857 he published his own Pitman-like "Graham's Brief Longhand" that saw wide adoption in the United States in the late 19th century. He published a translation of the New Testament. His method landed him in a 1864 copyright infringement lawsuit by Benn Pitman in Ohio. Graham died in 1895 and was buried in Montclair's Rosedale Cemetery. As late as 1918 his company Andrew J. Graham & Co continued to market his method.

In his youth, Woodrow Wilson mastered the Graham system and even corresponded with Graham in Graham. Throughout his life, Wilson continued to develop and employ his own Graham system writing, to the point that by the 1950s, when the Graham method had all but disappeared, Wilson scholars had trouble interpreting his shorthand. In 1960 an 84-year-old anachronistic shorthand expert Clifford Gehman managed to crack Wilson's shorthand, demonstrating on a translation of Wilson's acceptance speech for the 1912 presidential nomination.

=== Japan ===
Our Japanese pen shorthand began in 1882, transplanted from the American Pitman-Graham system. Geometric theory has great influence in Japan. But Japanese motions of writing gave some influence to our shorthand. We are proud to have reached the highest speed in capturing spoken words with a pen. Major pen shorthand systems are Shuugiin, Sangiin, Nakane and Waseda [a repeated vowel shown here means a vowel spoken in double-length in Japanese, sometimes shown instead as a bar over the vowel]. Including a machine-shorthand system, Sokutaipu, we have 5 major shorthand systems now. The Japan Shorthand Association now has 1,000 members.

— Tsuguo Kaneko

There are several other pen shorthands in use (Ishimura, Iwamura, Kumassaki, Kotani, and Nissokuken), leading to a total of nine pen shorthands in use. In addition, there is the Yamane pen shorthand (of unknown importance) and three machine shorthands systems (Speed Waapuro, Caver and Hayatokun or sokutaipu). The machine shorthands have gained some ascendancy over the pen shorthands.

Japanese shorthand systems (sokki shorthand or sokkidou stenography) commonly use a syllabic approach, much like the common writing system for Japanese (which has actually two syllabaries in everyday use). There are several semi-cursive systems. Most follow a left-to-right, top-to-bottom writing direction. Several systems incorporate a loop into many of the strokes, giving the appearance of Gregg, Graham, or Cross's Eclectic shorthand without actually functioning like them. The Kotani (aka Same-Vowel-Same-Direction or SVSD or V-type) system's strokes frequently cross over each other and in so doing form loops.

Japanese also has its own variously cursive form of writing kanji characters, the most extremely simplified of which is known as Sōsho.

The two Japanese syllabaries are themselves adapted from the Chinese characters: both of the syllabaries, katakana and hiragana, are in everyday use alongside the Chinese characters known as kanji; the kanji, being developed in parallel to the Chinese characters, have their own idiosyncrasies, but Chinese and Japanese ideograms are largely comprehensible, even if their use in the languages are not the same.

Prior to the Meiji era, Japanese did not have its own shorthand (the kanji did have their own abbreviated forms borrowed alongside them from China). Takusari Kooki was the first to give classes in a new Western-style non-ideographic shorthand of his own design, emphasis being on the non-ideographic and new. This was the first shorthand system adapted to writing phonetic Japanese, all other systems prior being based on the idea of whole or partial semantic ideographic writing like that used in the Chinese characters, and the phonetic approach being mostly peripheral to writing in general. Even today, Japanese writing uses the syllabaries to pronounce or spell out words, or to indicate grammatical words. Furigana are written alongside kanji, or Chinese characters, to indicate their pronunciation especially in juvenile publications. Furigana are usually written using the hiragana syllabary; foreign words may not have a kanji form and are spelled out using katakana.

The new sokki were used to transliterate popular vernacular story-telling theater (yose) of the day. This led to a thriving industry of sokkibon (shorthand books). The ready availability of the stories in book form, and higher rates of literacy (which the very industry of sokkibon may have helped create, due to these being oral classics that were already known to most people) may also have helped kill the yose theater, as people no longer needed to see the stories performed in person to enjoy them. Sokkibon also allowed a whole host of what had previously been mostly oral rhetorical and narrative techniques into writing, such as imitation of dialect in conversations (which can be found back in older gensaku literature; but gensaku literature used conventional written language in between conversations, however).

=== Korea ===
Shorthand for the native Korean alphabet Hangul saw limited use before the 1945 liberation of Korea. It began to see practical use only after that. Various systems were developed in the 1940s and 1950s. After the 1948 establishment of South Korea, the National Assembly had its stenographers adopt a variety of styles. In 1969, the parliamentary style Hangul shorthand (의회식; 議會式; Uihoesik) was developed and became the widespread standard, although other standards continued to be used. The need for Hangul shorthand faded with the rise of computerized stenography in the 1990s.

=== Oceania ===
In New Zealand, cleric Herbert W. Williams produced a book for writing Māori shorthand in 1896.

== Classification ==
=== Geometric and script-like systems ===
Shorthands that use simplified letterforms are sometimes termed stenographic shorthands, contrasting with alphabetic shorthands, below. Stenographic shorthands can be further differentiated by the target letter forms as geometric, script, and semi-script or elliptical.

Geometric shorthands are based on circles, parts of circles, and straight lines placed strictly horizontally, vertically or diagonally. The first modern shorthand systems were geometric. Examples include Pitman shorthand, Boyd's syllabic shorthand, Samuel Taylor's Universal Stenography, the French Prévost-Delaunay, and the Duployé system, adapted to write the Kamloops Wawa (used for Chinook Jargon) writing system.

Script shorthands are based on the motions of ordinary handwriting. The first system of this type was published under the title Cadmus Britanicus by Simon Bordley, in 1787. However, the first practical system was the German Gabelsberger shorthand of 1834. This class of system is now common in all more recent German shorthand systems, as well as in Austria, Italy, Scandinavia, the Netherlands, Russia, other Eastern European countries, and elsewhere.

Script-geometric, or semi-script, shorthands are based on the ellipse. Semi-script can be considered a compromise between the geometric systems and the script systems. The first such system was that of George Carl Märes in 1885. However, the most successful system of this type was Gregg shorthand, introduced by John Robert Gregg in 1888. Gregg had studied not only the geometric English systems, but also the German Stolze stenography, a script shorthand. Other examples include Teeline Shorthand and Thomas Natural Shorthand.

The semi-script philosophy gained popularity in Italy in the first half of the 20th century with three different systems created by Giovanni Vincenzo Cima, Erminio Meschini, and Stenital Mosciaro.

=== Systems resembling standard writing ===
Some shorthand systems attempted to ease learning by using characters from the Latin alphabet. Such non-stenographic systems have often been described as alphabetic, and purists might claim that such systems are not 'true' shorthand. However, these alphabetic systems do have value for students who cannot dedicate the years necessary to master a stenographic shorthand. Alphabetic shorthands cannot be written at the speeds theoretically possible with symbol systems—200 words per minute or more—but require only a fraction of the time to acquire a useful speed of between 70 and 100 words per minute.

Non-stenographic systems often supplement alphabetic characters by using punctuation marks as additional characters, giving special significance to capitalised letters, and sometimes using additional non-alphabetic symbols. Examples of such systems include Stenoscript, Speedwriting and Forkner shorthand. However, there are some pure alphabetic systems, including Personal Shorthand, SuperWrite, Easy Script Speed Writing, Keyscript Shorthand and Yash3k which limit their symbols to a priori alphabetic characters. These have the added advantage that they can also be typed—for instance, onto a computer, PDA, or cellphone. Early editions of Speedwriting were also adapted so that they could be written on a typewriter, and therefore would possess the same advantage.

=== Varieties of vowel representation ===
Shorthand systems can also be classified according to the way that vowels are represented.

- Alphabetic – Expression by "normal" vowel signs that are not fundamentally different from consonant signs (e.g., Gregg, Duployan).
- Mixed alphabetic – Expression of vowels and consonants by different kinds of strokes (e.g., Arends' system for German or Melin's Swedish Shorthand where vowels are expressed by upward or sideway strokes and consonants and consonant clusters by downward strokes).
- Abjad – No expression of the individual vowels at all except for indications of an initial or final vowel (e.g., Taylor).
- Marked abjad – Expression of vowels by the use of detached signs (such as dots, ticks, and other marks) written around the consonant signs.
- Positional abjad – Expression of an initial vowel by the height of the word in relation to the line, no necessary expression of subsequent vowels (e.g., Pitman, which can optionally express other vowels by detached diacritics).
- Abugida – Expression of a vowel by the shape of a stroke, with the consonant indicated by orientation (e.g., Boyd).
- Mixed abugida – Expression of the vowels by the width of the joining stroke that leads to the following consonant sign, the height of the following consonant sign in relation to the preceding one, and the line pressure of the following consonant sign (e.g., most German shorthand systems).

=== Machine shorthand systems ===
Traditional shorthand systems are written on paper with a stenographic pencil or a stenographic pen. Some consider that only handwritten systems can strictly speaking be called shorthand.

Machine shorthand is also a common term for writing produced by a stenotype, a specialized keyboard. These are often used for court room transcripts and in live subtitling. However, there are other shorthand machines used worldwide, including: Velotype; Palantype in the UK; Grandjean Stenotype, used extensively in France and French-speaking countries; Michela Stenotype, used extensively in Italy; and Stenokey, used in Bulgaria and elsewhere.

== Common modern English shorthand systems ==
One of the most widely used forms of shorthand is still the Pitman shorthand method described above, which has been adapted for 15 languages. Pitman's method was extremely popular at first and is still commonly used, especially in the UK. In the U.S., its popularity has been largely superseded by Gregg shorthand, developed by John Robert Gregg in 1888.

In the UK, the spelling-based (rather than phonetic) Teeline shorthand is now more commonly taught and used than Pitman, and Teeline is the recommended system of the National Council for the Training of Journalists with an overall speed of 100 words per minute necessary for certification. Other less commonly used systems in the UK are Pitman 2000, PitmanScript, Speedwriting, and Gregg. Teeline is also the most common shorthand method taught to New Zealand journalists, whose certification typically requires a shorthand speed of at least 80 words per minute.

In Nigeria, shorthand is still taught in higher institutions of learning, especially for students studying Office Technology Management and Business Education.

== Notable shorthand systems ==
- Chandler shorthand (Mary Chandler Atherton)
- Current Shorthand (Henry Sweet)
- Duployan shorthand (Émile Duployé)
- Eclectic shorthand (J.G. Cross)
- Gabelsberger shorthand (Franz Xaver Gabelsberger)
- Deutsche Einheitskurzschrift (German Unified Shorthand), which is based on the ideas of systems by Gabelsberger, Stolze, Faulmann, and other German system inventors
- Gregg shorthand (John Robert Gregg)
- Munson Shorthand (James Eugene Munson)
- Personal Shorthand, originally called Briefhand
- Pitman shorthand (Isaac Pitman)
- Speedwriting (Emma Dearborn)
- Teeline Shorthand (James Hill)
- Tironian notes (Marcus Tullius Tiro)

== See also ==
- Abbreviation – Shortened form of a word or phrase
- Acronym – Abbreviation consisting of initial letters of a phrase
- Autocomplete – Computing feature predicting ending to a word a user is typing
- Breviograph – Type of abbreviation
- Captioned telephone – Assisted 'voice to text' system
- Closed captioning – Process of displaying interpretive texts to screens
- Court reporter – Person who records live court testimony
- Internet slang – Slang terms and languages used on the Internet
- Interpreting notes – Interpreters' working notes
- Modi script – Historical script used in the Maratha Empire
- Quikscript – Alternative English-language alphabet
- Scribal abbreviation – Abbreviations used by ancient and medieval scribes
- Shavian alphabet – Phonemic, featural alphabet for English
- Speech-to-text reporter – Human occupation
- Stenomask – Microphone in a soundproof mask
- Stenotype – Specialized typewriter or chorded keyboard for recording in shorthand
- Transcript (law) – Written record of spoken language, especially in the context of court proceedings
