= Stenoscript =

1950 Writing System

Stenoscript or Stenoscript ABC Shorthand is a shorthand system invented by Manuel Claude Avancena (1923–1987) and first published in 1950. Encyclopædia Britannica, perhaps erroneously, claims it was based on a system published in London in 1607. An unrelated project also called Stenoscript was written by George A.S. Oliver and published in London in 1934.

== History ==
According to a profile published in The News (the daily newspaper in Frederick, Maryland, April 8, 1968), Avancena was attending law school at George Washington University in the late 1940s. He objected to the steep learning curve of Gregg shorthand and dropped the shorthand class in order to devote his free time to developing a system that could be learned more quickly. After spending many hours in the Library of Congress studying stenography and word frequency statistics, he eventually self-published his first Stenoscript book and taught classes to promote his system.

Numerous revised editions of the Stenoscript manual were published through 1989. A Spanish edition was published in 1967, a book of dictation drills appeared in 1972 and Stenoscript dictionary was issued in 1989. The system was taught in some American high schools and colleges although it is difficult to determine how many. A few academic dissertations and theses compared the progress of Stenoscript students to learners of other systems.

== Writing ==
Stenoscript is written using traditional longhand cursive characters with a few variations (t's are not crossed, i's and j's are not dotted, m's and w's are written as a single long curve, and 'F' is written like a crossed '7') and a few punctuation marks (dash, slash, comma) used as letters. Lower-case letters are used for phonetically spelling words. Upper-case letters have special meanings: for example, 'F' represents the suffix -ful or -fully and 'S' represents the letter-pair st. Unless they are silent, vowels are written when they occur at the beginning or end of a word, but monophthongs within words are omitted: "bank" becomes bq. (The letter 'q' represents the -nk sound.) Instead of writing -ed or -d at the end of a word, Stenoscript indicates the past tense of a verb by underlining the final letter of the stem.

The author claimed that a student of his system could "attain a speed of 80 words a minute with comparatively little effort" and that speeds of 100 to 120 words per minute could be reached after intensive study and drilling.

== Commentary ==
The system is a standardised form of abbreviation. For example, ak stands for "acknowledge" and all its derivations. Although it is generally slower to write in than more abbreviated forms of shorthand such as Gregg and Pitman, it remains closer to alphabetic orthography. For example,

I ak — k— k—
"I acknowledge the client's comment"
