= Speedwriting =

Any of three versions of shorthand system

- Script type: cursive Alphabetic Shorthand – also typed
- Creator: Emma Dearborn
- Published: 1924
- Period: 1924–present
- Languages: English

Related scripts
- Parent systems: Egyptian hieroglyphs: Proto-Sinaitic script; Phoenician alphabet; Greek alphabet; Old Italic script; Latin script; English alphabet; Speedwriting

Speedwriting is the trademark under which three versions of a shorthand system were marketed during the 20th century. The original version was designed so that it could be written with a pen or typed on a typewriter. At the peak of its popularity, Speedwriting was taught in more than 400 vocational schools and its advertisements were ubiquitous in popular American magazines.

== Description of the original version ==
The original version of Speedwriting uses letters of the alphabet and a few punctuation marks to represent the sounds of English. There are abbreviations for common prefixes and suffixes; for example, uppercase ⟨N⟩ represents enter- or inter- so "entertainment" is written as Ntn- and "interrogation" is reduced to Ngj. Vowels are omitted from many words and arbitrary abbreviations are provided for the most common words.

Specimen: ltus vaqt ll p/, aspz rNb otfm. "Let us have a quiet little party and surprise our neighbor on the farm."

By reducing the use of spaces between words a high level of brevity can be achieved: "laugh and the world laughs with you" can be written as "lfatwolfs wu".

Original Speedwriting can be typed on a typewriter or computer keyboard. When writing with a pen, one uses regular cursive handwriting with a few small modifications. Lowercase ⟨t⟩ is written as a simple vertical line and ⟨l⟩ must be written with a distinctive loop; specific shapes for various letters are prescribed in the textbook.

With twelve weeks of training, students could achieve speeds of 80 to 100 words per minute writing with a pen. The inventor of the system was able to type notes on a typewriter as fast as anyone could speak, therefore she believed Speedwriting could eliminate the need for steno-type machines in most applications.

== History of the original version ==
Emma B. Dearborn (February 1, 1875 – July 28, 1937) worked as a shorthand instructor and trainer of shorthand teachers at Simmons College, Columbia University, and several other institutions. She was an expert in several pen stenography systems as well as stenotype.

Having seen students struggle to master the complexities of symbol-based shorthand systems and steno-type theory, Dearborn decided to design a system that would be easier to learn. An early edition of her system was called "The Steno Short-Type System".

Dearborn organized a corporation in 1924 and rebranded her shorthand system under the name of Speedwriting. Starting with just $192 (equivalent to $3,607 in 2025) of capital, she used print advertising to turn her textbooks and classes into a thriving international company with offices in England and Canada. Dearborn's company offered correspondence courses to individuals while vocational schools around the country paid an annual franchise fee for the right to teach Speedwriting classes within a specified territory.

In addition to the extensive use of newspaper and magazine ads, Speedwriting gained publicity from a few unsolicited endorsements. Commander Richard E. Byrd commissioned Dearborn to teach her shorthand system to some members of his upcoming polar expedition. Theodore Roosevelt Jr. cited Dearborn as an example of women making great contributions to the business world. In 1937 the Works Progress Administration sponsored free Speedwriting classes as part of its Emergency Education Program.

Dearborn died by suicide in 1937. The School of Speedwriting organization continued publishing her textbooks and making franchise deals with vocational schools through about 1950.

== Later versions ==
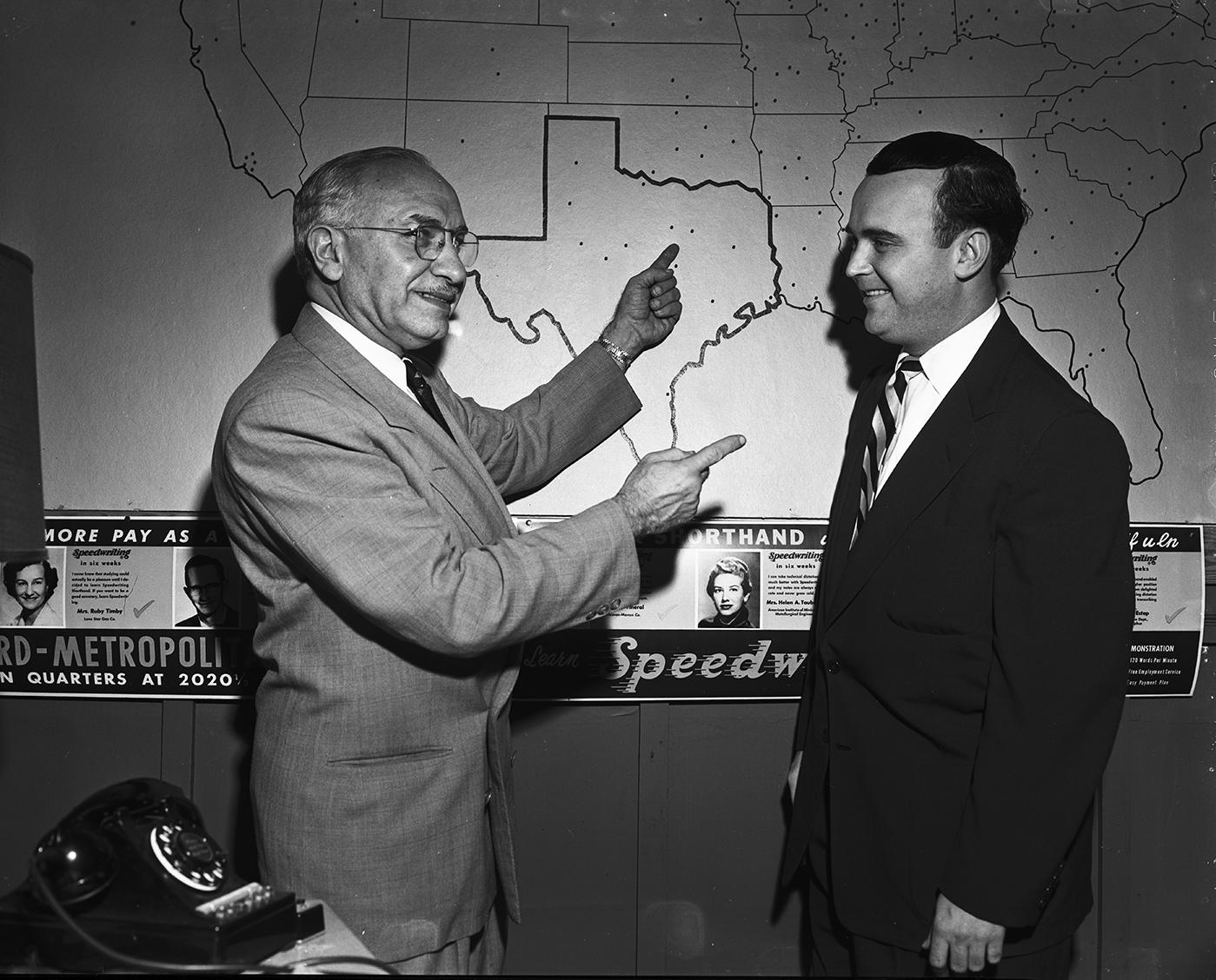
Dr. Alexander L. Sheff, left, president of Speedwriting Company, points out the pin that marks Fort Worth as one of 400 cities in which the alphabet-type of shorthand is offered. October 28, 1953

The second version of Speedwriting, designed by Alexander L. Sheff (July 21, 1898 – June 27, 1978) in the early 1950s, introduced some symbols that could not be produced on a typewriter such as arcs representing the letters 'm' and 'w'. This version modified a few of the abbreviating principles also. Changes implemented in the Sheff version include the following:

- vowels are included rather than omitted slightly more often; "cheap" is written as cep instead of cp
- the word "the" is indicated by a dot rather than the letter t
- period at the end of the sentence is written as a large diagonal stroke \ rather than a dot
- past tense of a regular verb is indicated by a short horizontal stroke above the final letter of the root-word
- the -ing suffix is indicated by a short horizontal mark under the last letter of the outline rather than the letter g

A Spanish-language edition of the Sheff version was published in 1966. A Portuguese-language adaptation was published in 1968 by Prof. Plínio Leite, of Niterói (Brazil), who had licensed the exclusive teaching rights for Speedwriting in Brazil and Portugal. The Portuguese version was authored by him in collaboration with Prof. José Henrique Robertson Silva.

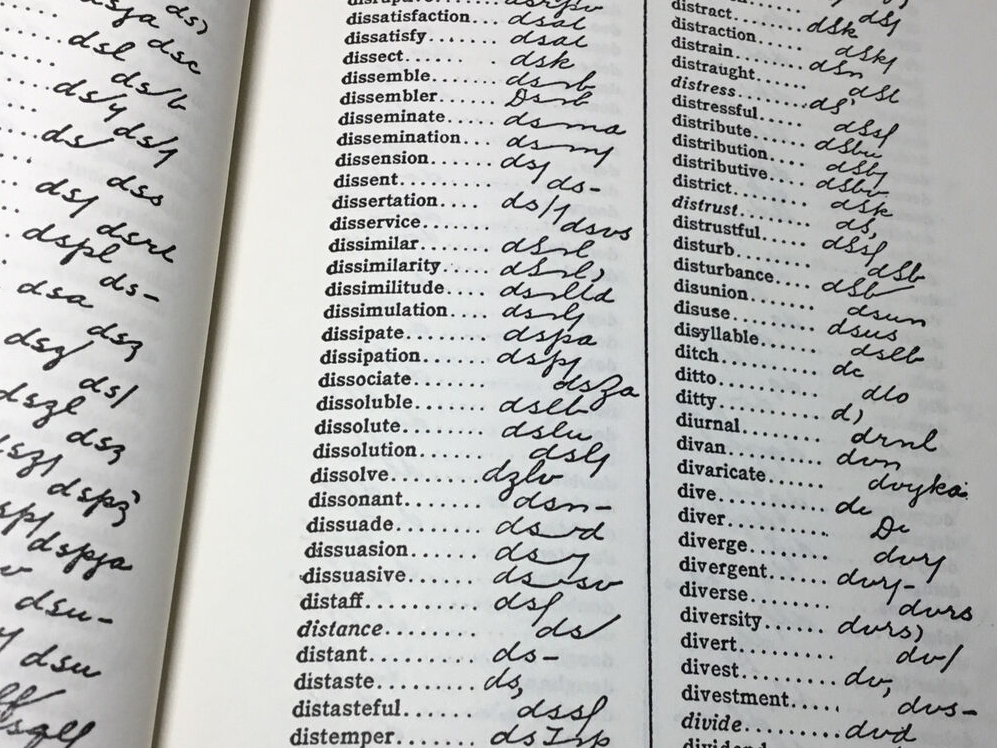
Speedwriting Dictionary (Century Edition 1951)

Starting in 1974 a variant of Speedwriting called Landmark Shorthand was taught in some American high schools and universities. Students generally enjoyed Landmark classes more than symbol-based shorthand because of the "immediate positive feedback ... Within minutes, words, phrases and sentences are written readily."

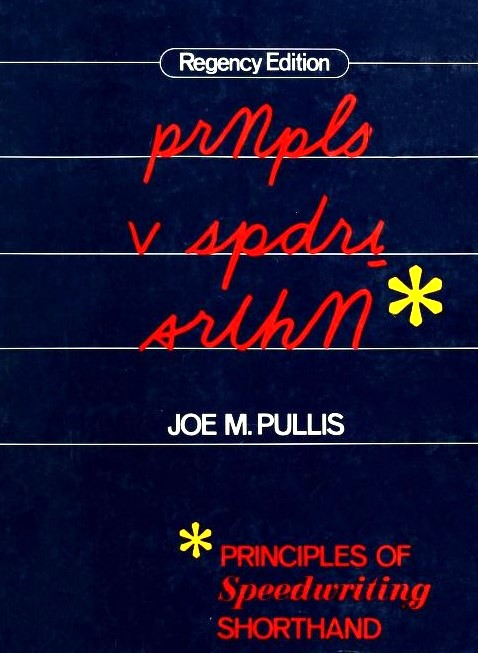
Speedwriting version by Joe M. Pullis published in 1984

In the 1980s Joe M. Pullis designed the third major version of Speedwriting which further modified the system's symbols and principles. Changes implemented in the Pullis version include the following:

- the sound of 'k' is written with lowercase c
- the "ch" sound is written with uppercase C
- the "sh" sound is written with a modified lowercase cursive s, as in Forkner shorthand
- the past tense of regular verbs is indicated with a hyphen on the line of writing
- the period, question mark, and end of paragraph symbols are identical to those of Gregg shorthand
- the brief forms for it/at, the, is/his are also the same as in Gregg

== Ownership history ==
Ownership of the Speedwriting trademark and the textbook copyrights changed hands several times. Dearborn's first corporation, formed in 1924, was called Brief English Systems. Later that was replaced by the Speedwriting Publishing Company which published textbooks under the name of its subsidiary, School of Speedwriting. By the 1970s ITT had purchased School of Speedwriting. At various times Macmillan and McGraw-Hill owned the Speedwriting trademark.

=== Brief English Systems v. Owen (1931) ===
John P. Owen, a former Speedwriting student, published a book describing a new shorthand system that was very similar to Speedwriting. Dearborn's organization sued him for copyright violation.

In 1931 the Second Circuit Court of Appeals ruled that a particular textbook of shorthand could be copyrighted but the system itself is an invention or process rather than a literary work and cannot be copyrighted. "There is no literary merit in a mere system of condensing written words into less than the number of letters usually used to spell them out. Copyrightable material is found, if at all, in the explanation of how to do it."
