= Pitman shorthand =

System of shorthand for English, developed by Isaac Pitman

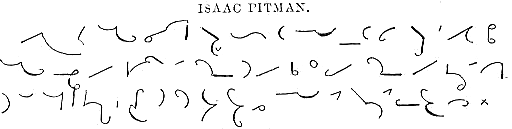
- The Lord's Prayer in Pitman shorthand
- Script type: heavy-line geometric abugida Stenography
- Creator: Isaac Pitman
- Published: 1837
- Period: 1837–present
- Languages: English

Related scripts
- Child systems: Pitman's New Era; Pitman's 2000; Western Cree syllabics (finals)

Pitman shorthand is a system of shorthand for the English language developed by Isaac Pitman (1813–1897), who first presented it in 1837. Like most systems of shorthand, it is a phonetic transcription system; the symbols do not represent letters, but rather sounds, and words are, for the most part, written as they are spoken.

Shorthand was referred to as phonography in the 19th century. It was first used by newspapers who sent phonographers to cover important speeches, usually stating (as a claim of accuracy) that they had done so. The practice got national attention in the United States in 1858 during the Lincoln–Douglas Debates which were recorded phonographically. The shorthand was converted into words during the trip back to Chicago, where typesetters and telegraphers awaited them.

At its peak popularity in the late 1800s, Pitman shorthand was the most popular shorthand system used in the United Kingdom and the second most popular in the United States.

One characteristic feature of Pitman shorthand is that unvoiced and voiced pairs of sounds (such as /p/ and /b/ or /t/ and /d/) are represented by strokes which differ only in thickness; the thin stroke representing "light" sounds such as /p/ and /t/; the thick stroke representing "heavy" sounds such as /b/ and /d/. Doing this requires a writing instrument responsive to the user's drawing pressure: specialist fountain pens (with fine, flexible nibs) were originally used, but pencils are now more commonly used.

Pitman shorthand uses straight strokes and quarter-circle strokes, in various orientations, to represent consonant sounds. The predominant way of indicating vowels is to use light or heavy dots, dashes, or other special marks drawn close to the consonant. Vowels are drawn before the stroke (or over a horizontal stroke) if the vowel is pronounced before the consonant, and after the stroke (or under a horizontal stroke) if pronounced after the consonant. Each vowel, whether indicated by a dot for a short vowel or by a dash for a longer, more drawn-out vowel, has its own position relative to its adjacent stroke (beginning, middle, or end) to indicate different vowel sounds in an unambiguous system. However, to increase writing speed, rules of "vowel indication" exist whereby the consonant stroke is raised, kept on the line, or lowered to match whether the first vowel of the word is written at the beginning, middle, or end of a consonant stroke—without actually writing the vowel. This is often enough to distinguish words with similar consonant patterns. Another method of vowel indication is to choose from among a selection of different strokes for the same consonant. For example, the sound "R" has two kinds of strokes: round, or straight-line, depending on whether there is a vowel sound before or after the R.

There have been several versions of Pitman's shorthand since 1837. The original Pitman's shorthand had an "alphabet" of consonants, which was later modified. Additional modifications and rules were added to successive versions. Pitman New Era (1922–1975) had the most developed set of rules and abbreviation lists. Pitman 2000 (1975–present) introduced some simplifications and drastically reduced the list of abbreviations to reduce the memory load, officially reduced to a list of 144 short forms. The later versions dropped certain symbols and introduced other simplifications to earlier versions. For example, strokes "rer" (heavy curved downstroke) and "kway" (hooked horizontal straight stroke) are present in Pitman's New Era, but not in Pitman's 2000.

== History ==
Isaac Pitman was asked to create a shorthand system of his own in 1838. He had used Samuel Taylor's system for seven years, but his symbols bear greater similarity to an older system created by John Byrom. The first phonetician to invent a system of shorthand, Pitman used similar-looking symbols for phonetically related sounds. He was the first to use thickness of a stroke to indicate voicing (voiced consonants such as /b/ and /d/ are written with heavier and lighter lines than unvoiced ones such as /p/ and /t/), and consonants with similar place of articulation were oriented in similar directions, with straight lines for plosives and arcs for fricatives. For example, the dental and alveolar consonants are upright: ⟨|⟩ = /t/, ⟨|⟩ = /d/, ⟨)⟩ = /s/, ⟨)⟩ = /z/, ⟨(⟩ = /θ/ (as in thigh), ⟨(⟩ = /ð/ (as in thy).

Pitman's brother Benjamin Pitman settled in Cincinnati, Ohio, in the United States and introduced Pitman's system there. He used it in the 1865–1867 trial of the conspirators behind the assassination of Abraham Lincoln. In Australia the system was introduced by another Pitman brother, Jacob. Jacob Pitman is buried in Rookwood Necropolis, Sydney. His epitaph is written phonetically:

IN LUVING MEMERI OV JACOB PITMAN, BORN 28th NOV. 1810 AT TROWBRIDGE ENGLAND, SETELD IN ADELAIDE 1838, DEID 12TH MARCH 1890. ARKITEKT, INTRODIUST FONETIK SHORTHAND AND WOZ THE FERST MINISTER IN THEEZ KOLONIZ OV THE DOKTRINZ OV THE SEKOND OR NIU KRISTIAN CHURCH WHICH AKNOLEJEZ THE LORD JESUS CHRIST IN HIZ DEVEIN HIUMANITI AZ THE KREATER OV THE YUNIVERS, THE REDEEMER AND REJENERATER OV MEN. GOD OVER AUL, BLESED FOR EVER.

At one time, Pitman was the most commonly used shorthand system in the entire English-speaking world. Part of its popularity was due to the fact that it was the first subject taught by correspondence course. Today in many regions (especially the U.S.), it has been superseded by Gregg shorthand, developed by John Robert Gregg. Teeline has become more common in recent years, as it is based on spelling, rather than pronunciation.

== Writing ==
Like Gregg shorthand, Pitman shorthand is phonemic: with the exception of abbreviated shapes called logograms, the forms represent the sounds of the English word, rather than its spelling or meaning. Unlike Gregg, pairs of consonant phonemes distinguished only by voice are notated with strokes differing in thickness rather than length. There are twenty-four consonants that can be represented in Pitman's shorthand, twelve vowels, and four diphthongs. The consonants are indicated by strokes, the vowels by interposed dots.

=== Logograms (short forms) ===

Common words are represented by special outlines called logograms (or short forms in Pitman's New Era). Words and phrases which have such forms are called grammalogues. Hundreds exist and only a tiny number are shown above. The shapes are written separately to show that they represent distinct words, but in common phrases ("you are", "thank you", etc.) two or three logograms may be joined together, or a final flick added to represent the.

=== Consonants ===
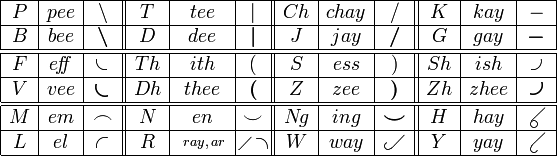

The consonants in Pitman's shorthand are pronounced pee, bee, tee, dee, chay, jay, kay, gay, eff, vee, ith, thee, ess, zee, ish, zhee, em, el, en, ray ar, ing, way, hay, and yay. When both an unvoiced consonant and its corresponding voiced consonant are present in this system, the distinction is made by drawing the stroke for the voiced consonant thicker than the one for the unvoiced consonant. (Thus s is ⟨)⟩ and z is ⟨)⟩.) There are two strokes for r: ar and ray. The former assumes the form of the top right-hand quarter of a circle (drawn top-down), whereas the latter is like chay ⟨/⟩, only less steep (drawn bottom to top). There are rules governing when to use each of these forms.

=== Vowels ===
The long vowels in Pitman's shorthand are: /ɑː/, /eɪ/, /iː/, /ɔː/, /oʊ/, and /uː/. The short vowels are /æ/, /ɛ/, /ɪ/, /ɒ/, /ʌ/, and /ʊ/. The long vowels may be remembered by the sentence, "Pa, may we all go too?" /pɑː | meɪ wiː ɔːl ɡoʊ tuː/, and the short vowels may be remembered by the sentence, "That pen is not much good" /ðæt pɛn ɪz nɒt mʌt͡ʃ ɡʊd/.

A vowel is represented by a dot or a dash, which is written with either a light stroke (for a short vowel) or heavy stroke (for a long vowel). For example, sate is written as ")•|", but set is written as ")·|"; seat is written as ").|", but sit is written as ").|". Vowels are further distinguished by their position relative to the consonant stroke – beginning, middle or end – for a total of 12 possible combinations.

Another feature of Pitman's shorthand allows most vowels to be omitted in order to speed up the process of writing. As mentioned above, each vowel is written next to either the beginning, middle or end of the consonant stroke. Pitman's shorthand is designed to be written on lined paper and when a word's first vowel is a "first position" vowel (i.e. it is written at the beginning of the stroke), the whole shorthand outline for the word is written above the paper's ruled line. For a second position vowel, the outline is written on the line, and for a third position vowel, it is written through the line. In this way, the position of the outline indicates that the first vowel can only be one of four possibilities. In most cases, this means that the first and often all the other vowels can be omitted entirely.

=== Diphthongs ===
$ie \;\;\; ^\lor \qquad oi \;\;\; ^\mathfrak{7} \qquad ow \;\;\; _\land \qquad ew \;\;\; _\cap$

There are four diphthongs in Pitman's shorthand, representing /aɪ/, /ɔɪ/, /aʊ/, /juː/, as in the words "I enjoy Gow's music." The first three appear as small checkmarks; the "ew" sound is written as a small arch. Both "ie" and "oi" are written in first position, while "ow" and "ew" are written in third position. In the same way, the whole outline is placed above, on or through the paper's ruled line. If the diphthong is followed by a neutral vowel, a little flick is added.

=== Other shapes ===
Circles
Circles are of two sizes – small and large. A small circle represents 's' (sing) and 'z' (gaze). A large circle at the beginning of a word represents the double consonant 'sw' (sweep). Elsewhere it represents 's-s': a sequence of two 's' or 'z' sounds with a vowel in between (crisis, crises or exercise). The vowel in the middle may be any of the vowels or diphthongs, though any vowel other than 'e' must be notated inside the circle.

Loops
Loops are of two sizes – small and large. The small loop represents 'st' and 'sd' (cost and based). The large loop represents 'ster' (master or masterpiece). The 'ster' loop is not used at the beginning of a word; i.e., it would not be used to notate the word sterling.

Hooks
Stroke-initial hooks. For straight strokes, an initial hook may be written in a clockwise or counterclockwise direction. A clockwise initial hook represents 'r' after the stroke (tray, Nichrome, bigger). A counter-clockwise initial hook represents 'l' after the stroke (ply, amplify, angle). For curved strokes, the hook is written inside the curve and a small hook represents 'r' while a large hook represents 'l'.
Stroke-final hooks. For straight strokes, a final hook may be written in a clockwise or counterclockwise direction. A clockwise final hook represents 'en' after the stroke (train, chin, genuine), while a counter-clockwise final hook represents 'eff' or 'vee' after the stroke (pave, calf, toughen). For curved strokes, the hook is written inside the curve and it represents 'n' after the stroke (men, thin).
'Shun' hook. A large hook written at the end of a stroke represents the sound 'shun' or 'zhun', as in fusion or vision. The 'shun' hook is written either to the left or right depending on the positions of other attachments and vowels in the stroke.

=== Halving and doubling ===
Halving
Many strokes (both straight and curved) may be halved in length to denote a final 't' or 'd'. The halving principle may be combined with an initial or final hook (or both) to make words such as "trained" appear as a single short vertical light stroke with an initial and final hook. There are some exceptions to avoid ambiguous forms; for example, a straight-r stroke can't be halved if it's the only syllable, because that might be confused for some other short-form (logogram) consisting of a short-stroke mark in that direction ("and" or "should").

Doubling
If a word contains 'ter', 'der', 'ture', 'ther', or 'dher'—for example, in matter, nature, or mother—the preceding stroke is written double the size. There are exceptions to avoid ambiguous forms; for example, "leader" is not written as a doubled-l but as l plus a hooked-d representing "dr". In contrast, "later", for example, is written with a doubled-l. Straight strokes at the beginning of a word are not doubled unless they have a final hook or attached diphthong.
