= Gregg shorthand =

Writing system

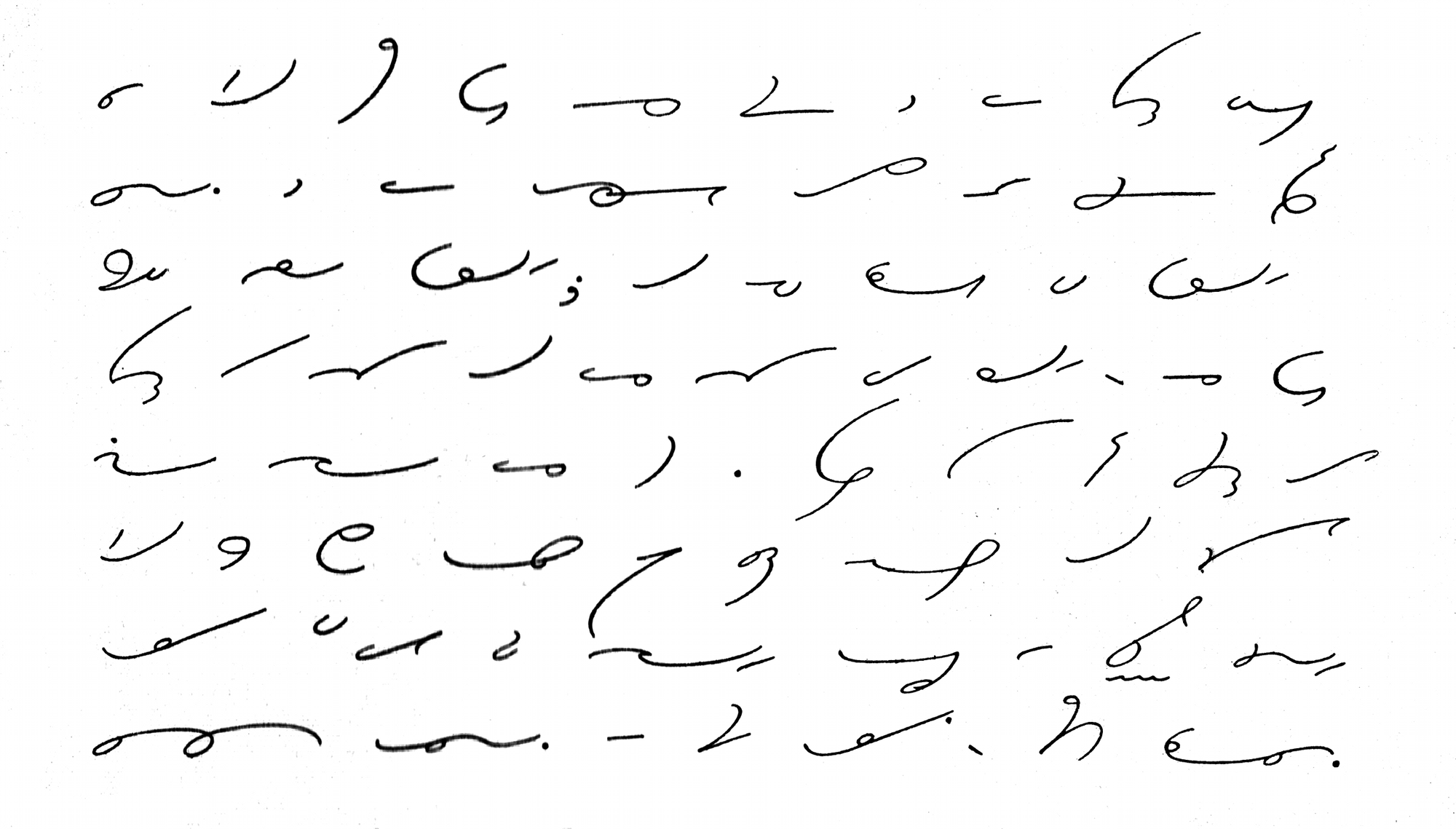
- Script type: light-line semi-script alphabetic stenography
- Creator: John Robert Gregg
- Period: 1888–present
- Languages: English, Afrikaans, Bahasa Indonesia, Bahasa Malaysia, Catalan, Esperanto, French, German, Hebrew, Irish, Japanese, Mandarin Chinese, Polish, Portuguese, Russian, Spanish, Thai, and Tagalog

Gregg shorthand is a system of shorthand developed by John Robert Gregg in 1889. Distinguished by its phonemic basis, the system prioritizes the sounds of speech over traditional English spelling, enabling rapid writing by employing elliptical figures and lines that bisect them. Gregg shorthand's design facilitates smooth, cursive strokes without the angular outlines characteristic of earlier systems like Duployan shorthand, thereby enhancing writing-speed and legibility.

Over the years, Gregg shorthand has undergone several revisions, each aimed at simplifying the system, which had the effect of a slight decrease in its speed and efficiency after the Anniversary edition, but made it easier to learn. These versions range from the Pre-Anniversary editions to the more recent Centennial version, with each adaptation maintaining the core principles while introducing modifications to suit varying needs and preferences. Its efficiency, once mastered, allows for speeds of more than 280 words per minute. The system is adaptable to both right- and left-handed writers.

== Background ==
Gregg shorthand, invented by John Robert Gregg in 1888, is a form of shorthand that, like cursive longhand, primarily uses elliptical figures and lines that bisect them. The advent of dictation machines, shorthand machines, handheld tape recorders, digital voice recorders, voice recording applications on smartphones, and the trend of executives drafting their own letters on personal computers has led to a gradual decline in shorthand usage in business and reporting contexts.

Gregg shorthand is often compared with Pitman shorthand due to their significant dominance over other English shorthand systems. While Pitman shorthand differentiates between similar sounds through line thickness and position, Gregg shorthand maintains uniform line thickness and uses stroke length to distinguish between sounds.

Initially, John Robert Gregg taught an adaptation of Duployan shorthand for English, a system that was predominant in France and characterized by uniform stroke thickness and attached vowel representation. However, he found the angular outlines of Duployan-based systems to be detrimental to speed.

Gregg shorthand is distinguished by its cursive strokes that blend smoothly, avoiding sharp angles, and its symbols are specifically designed for English, offering a better fit than the Duployan system. For example, Gregg shorthand has a unique symbol for the "th" sounds (/θ/ and /ð/), in contrast to Duployan systems, which use a dotted "t," resulting in slower writing.

== Writing ==
Examples of the main form.

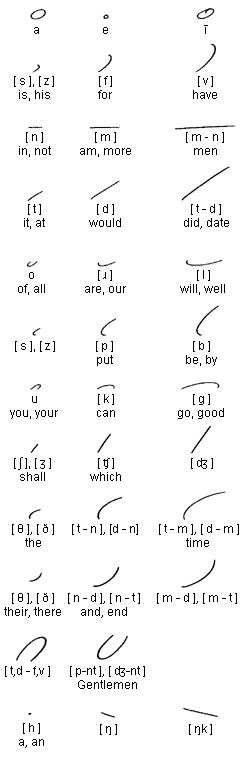
The strokes of Gregg Shorthand Simplified, with some brief forms

Gregg shorthand is a system of phonography, or a phonemic writing system, which means it records the sounds of the speaker, not the English spelling. For example, it uses the f stroke for the /f/ sound in funnel, telephone, and laugh, and omits all silent letters. The system is written from left to right and the letters are joined. Sh (= /ʃ/) (and zh = /ʒ/), Ch (= /tʃ/), and J (or Dzh, = /dʒ/) are written downward, while t and d are written upward. X /ks/ is expressed by putting a slight backward slant on the s symbol, though a word beginning ex is just written as if spelt es (and, according to Pre-Anniversary, ox is written as if os). W when in the middle of a word, is notated with a short dash under the next vowel. Therefore, the digraph qu (= /kw/) is usually written as k with a dash underneath the next vowel. In the Anniversary edition and before, if z need be distinguished from s, a small tick drawn at a right angle from the s may be written to make this distinction.

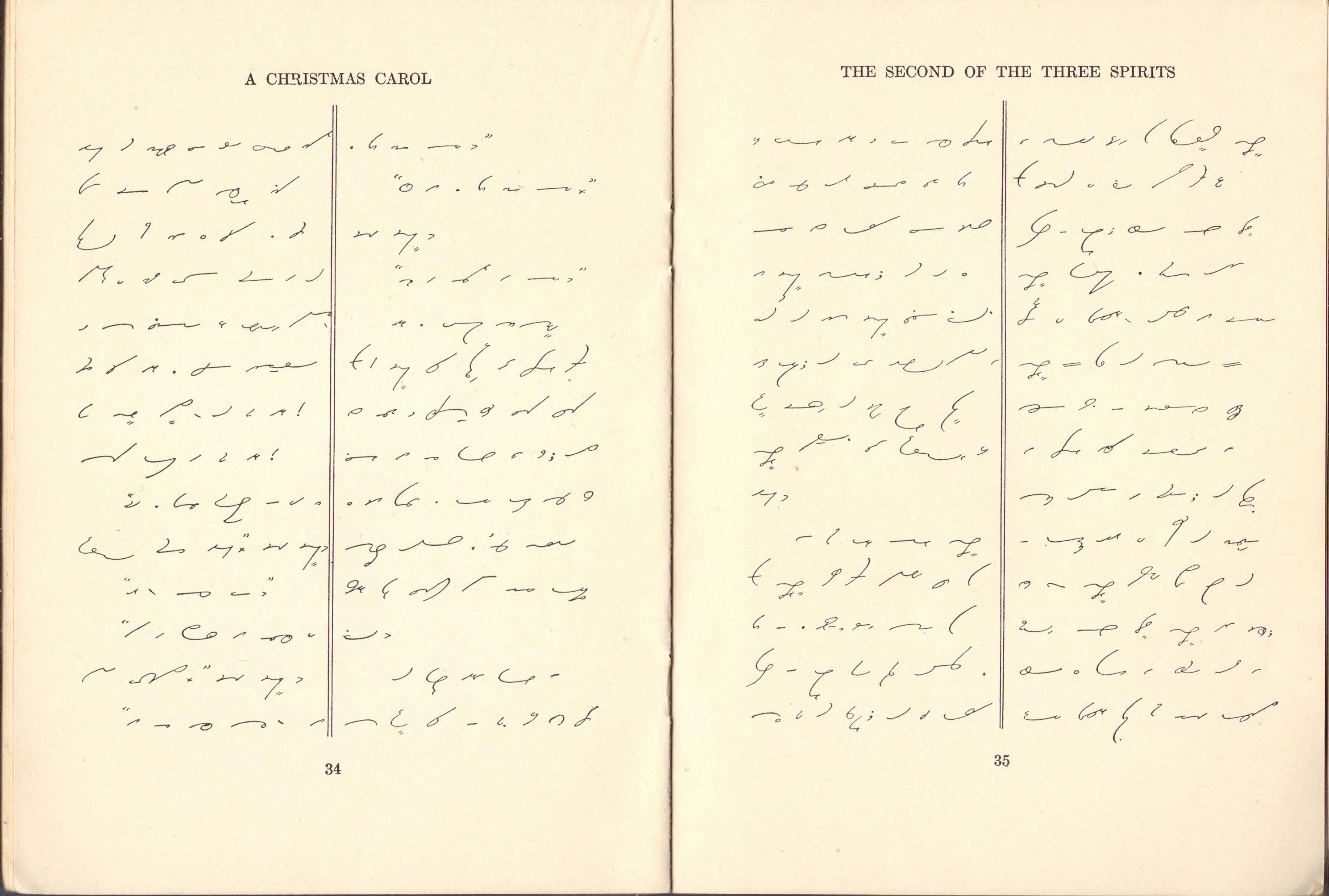
Sample of text from A Christmas Carol, published in Gregg shorthand, 1918

Many of the letters shown are also brief forms, or standard abbreviations for the most common words for increased speed in writing. For instance, instead of writing kan for "can", the Gregg stenographer just writes k. Some of these brief forms are shown in this image. Many are not shown, however. For instance, "please" is written in Simplified and before as simply pl, and "govern" as gv.

Phrasing is another mechanism for increasing the speed of shorthand writing. Based on the notion that lifting the pen between words would have a heavy speed cost, phrasing is the combination of several smaller distinct forms into one outline. For example, "it may be that the" can be written in one outline, "(tm)ab(th)a(th)". "I have not been able" would be written, "avnba" (note that to the eye of the reader this phrase written in shorthand looks like "I-have-not-been-able", and so phrasing is far more legible than a longhand explanation of the principle may lead one to believe).

The vowels in Gregg shorthand are divided into groups that very rarely require further notation. The a is a large circle, and can stand for the sounds in trap /æ/, palm /ɑː/, and face /eɪ/. The e is a small circle, and can stand for the sounds in dress /ɛ/, fleece /iː/, kit /ɪ/, and nurse /ɜːr/. ī represents the sound in price /aɪ/. The o is a small hook that represents the sounds in goat /oʊ/, lot /ɒ/, thought /ɔː/, and north /ɔːr/. The u is a small hook that represents the sounds in strut /ʌ/, foot /ʊ/, and goose /uː/. It also expresses a w at the beginning of a word. In Anniversary and before, short and long vowel sounds for e, a, o and u may be distinguished by a mark under the vowel, a dot for short and a small downward tick for long sounds.

There are special vowel markings for certain diphthongs. The ow in how /aʊ/ is just an a circle followed by a u hook. The io in lion /aɪ.ə/, or any diphthong involving a long i and a vowel, is written with a small circle inside a large circle. The ia in piano /i.æ/ and repudiate /i.eɪ/ is notated as a large circle with a dot in its center. In Anniversary and before, if ea need be distinguished from ia, it is notated with a small downward tick inside the circle instead of the dot. The u in united /juː/ is notated with a small circle followed by an u hook above it.

Due to the simple alphabet, Gregg shorthand is very fast in writing; however, it takes a great deal of practice to master it. Speeds of 280 WPM (where a word is 1.4 syllables) have been reached with this system before, and those notes are still legible to others who know the system.

Some left-handed shorthand writers have found it more comfortable to write Gregg shorthand from right to left.

== Versions ==
Throughout its history, different forms of Gregg shorthand have been published. All the versions use the same alphabet and basic principles, but they differ in degrees of abbreviation and, as a result, speed. The 1916 version is generally the fastest and most abbreviated version. Series 90 Gregg has the smallest degree of abbreviation, but it is also generally the slowest standard version of Gregg. Though each version differs in its level of abbreviation, most versions have expert and reporting versions for writers who desire more shortcuts.

Many versions of this system were published. Several of these versions were given names: Anniversary (published in 1929), Gregg Shorthand Simplified (1949), Diamond Jubilee (1963), and Series 90 (1978). The last version was Centennial, published in 1988. Versions published before 1929 are often referred to as Pre-Anniversary. These versions are described below in this article. Besides the main editions, a number of simpler, personal-use editions were published from 1924 to 1968. These included "Greghand" in 1935, and "Notehand" in 1960 and 1968.

=== Pre-Anniversary Gregg shorthand ===
Gregg Shorthand was first published in England 1888 by John Robert Gregg under the title Light Line Phonography; however, it was in a very primal stage. Due to its rough-and-ready character and the fact that Pitman shorthand was well established there, it did not gain much success. Five years later, in 1893, a second edition of the manual with an improved version of the system was published in the USA, then in a third edition titled Gregg Shorthand in 1897. The fourth edition, published in 1902, developed more shortcuts. The fifth edition, published in 1916, is the version most commonly referred to as "Pre-Anniversary" Gregg shorthand; this version has the largest number of brief forms, phrases, and shortcuts.

=== Gregg Shorthand Anniversary Edition ===
In 1929 another version of Gregg shorthand was published. This system reduced the memory load on its learners by decreasing the number of brief forms and removing uncommon prefixes. It was intended to have been published in 1928 on the 40th anniversary of the system, but it was published a year afterward due to a delay in its production.

=== Gregg Shorthand Simplified ===
Gregg Shorthand Simplified was published in 1949. This system drastically reduced the number of brief forms that needed to be memorized to only 181. Even with this reduction in the number of brief forms, one could still reach speeds upward of 150 WPM. The system was simplified to directly address the need of business stenographers, who only needed to produce 100–120 WPM transcription. The creator of an advanced reporting version of Gregg Shorthand, Charles Lee Swem, wrote in The National Shorthand Reporter, "An abbreviated, simplified edition of our system has been published and accepted for the purpose of training office stenographers, and not necessarily reporters." He also advised, "I do not believe any young student should hesitate to study Simplified for fear it will jeopardize his chances of becoming a reporter. It is fundamentally the same system as we reporters learned from the Anniversary edition. Once Simplified is learned, the change-over to the reporting style is comparatively simple and can be made by any writer."

=== Gregg Shorthand Diamond Jubilee Edition ===
The Diamond Jubilee series was published through most of the 1960s and the 1970s (1963–1977). It was simpler than the Simplified version, and reduced the number of brief forms to 129. For Diamond Jubilee students who wanted to increase speed for reporting, an edition of "Expert" Diamond Jubilee was available to push speeds upward.

=== Gregg Shorthand Series 90 ===
Series 90 (1978–1987) was an even simpler version, which used a minimal number of brief forms and placed a great emphasis on clear transcription, rather than reporting speed. Although it introduced a couple of new abbreviations and reintroduced some short forms that were missing in Diamond Jubilee, it eliminated several other short forms, and was in the main simpler, longer, and slower than the previous editions. Shorthand was dwindling in popularity during this series' usage.

=== Gregg Shorthand Centennial Edition ===
Published in 1988, this is the most recent series of Gregg shorthand. It was the only version since the Pre-Anniversary edition of 1916 to increase the complexity of the system from the previous one, having 132 brief forms.

=== Other versions ===
The above versions of Gregg shorthand were marketed for professional use, such as business and court reporting. Gregg Shorthand Junior Manual, designed for junior high school students, was published in 1927 and 1929. Greghand, A Simple Phonetic Writing for Everyday Use by Everyone was published as a pamphlet in 1935. The 1960 and 1968 editions of Gregg Notehand focused on how to take effective classroom and personal notes using a simple form of Gregg shorthand.

== Adaptations ==
Gregg shorthand has been adapted to several languages, including Afrikaans, Esperanto, French, German, Hebrew, Irish, Italian, Japanese, Polish, Portuguese, Russian, Spanish, Catalan, Thai, and Tagalog. With a few customizations, it can be adapted to nearly any language. The Mandarin Chinese version slightly modified the original system, under the name Beifang Suji (北方 速記 Běifāng sùjì 'Northern Shorthand').
