= List of shorthand systems =

This is a list of shorthands, both modern and ancient. Currently, only one shorthand (Duployan) has been given an ISO code, in preparation for inclusion in the Unicode Standard, although the Tironian et has already been included in Unicode.

Script name	ISO 15924	Year created	Creator	Primary languages	Notes
Abbreviated Longhand		1908	Angus Weaver	English	Short forms based around longhand writing.
Abbreviatrix		1945	William Paul Mishkin		
Abernethy shorthand		1907	Larkin Samuel Abernethy	English	
Aimé Paris Shorthand		1820	Aimé Paris	French	
Alpha Hand					
AgiliWriting					
Bezenšek Shorthand		1923	Anton Bezenšek	Bulgarian	
Boyd's Syllabic Shorthand		1903	Robert Boyd	English	
Brachygraphie (Folkingham)		1622	William Folkingham	English	
Brachygraphy (Bales)		1590	Peter Bales	English	
Brachygraphy (Dix)		1641	Henry Dix	English	
Brachygraphy (Shelton)		1672	Samuel Shelton	English	Based on Thomas Shelton's Tachygraphy from whom he first learned shorthand.
Burmese Shorthand		1952	Zwe Ohn Chein	Burmese	
Burnz' Fonic Shorthand		1896	Eliza Boardman Burnz	English	
Carissimi Shorthand		1940	Juan Antonio Carissimi	Spanish	
Caton Scientific Shorthand			Thomas Jasper Caton		
Century 21 Shorthand					
Characterie		1588	Timothy Bright	English	
Conen de Prépean Shorthand		1813	Louis Félix Conen de Prépean	French	
Coulon de Thévenot Shorthand		1776	Jean Coulon de Thévenot	French	
Current Shorthand		1892	Henry Sweet	English	
Cursive Shorthand		1889	Hugh Longbourne Callendar	English	
Dacomb Shorthand		1934	Beatrice Eliza Dacomb	English	
Dement's Aristography		1896	Isaac Strange Dement		
Deutsche Einheitskurzschrift		1924		German	Used in Germany.
Dickinson Shorthand		1928	Joseph Bryan Dickinson	English	
Duployé Shorthand	Dupl 755	1868	Émile Duployé	French, Romanian, English, Chinook Jargon	
Dutton Speedwords		1922	Reginald J. G. Dutton	English, French, German, Latin	Intended as an International auxiliary language
EasyScript Speed Writing					
Eclectic Shorthand		1878	J.G. Cross	English	
Edmond Willis's Shorthand		1627	Edmond Willis	English	
Faulmann Shorthand		1875	Carl Faulmann	German	
Forkner shorthand		1952	Hamden L. Forkner	English	
Gabelsberger shorthand		1817 (approx.)	Franz Xaver Gabelsberger	German	
Graham shorthand			Andrew J. Graham		
Gregg Shorthand		1888	John Robert Gregg	English, Esperanto, French, German, Italian, Mandarin Chinese, Polish, Portuguese, Spanish	
Gregg Computer Shorthand / Productivity Plus					
Groote		1899	Arnold Willem Groote	Dutch	Used in the Netherlands
Herout-Mikulík			Alois Herout and Svojmír Mikulík	Czech	Used in the Czech parliament.
Homographie		1831	Sophie Scott	German	
Hy-Speed Longhand		1932	Andrew Graham Sexton and R. B. Sexton	English	
Karundeng Shorthand		1925	Eliezer Karundeng	Indonesian	
Larralde Shorthand			Gabriel Hilario Larralde	Spanish	Used in the Argentine congress.
Legible Shorthand		1882	Edward Pocknell	English	
Leite Alves Shorthand		1929	Oscar Leite Alves	Portuguese	
Lightning Legible Shorthand		1906	David Rose Glass	English	
Malone Shorthand					
Maron Shorthand		1932	Afonso Maron	Portuguese	
Melin Shorthand		1880	Olof Werling Melin	Swedish	Dominant Shorthand system in Sweden.
Merrill Shorthand		1942	Albert Merrill	English	Also called ABC shorthand.
Michela Shorthand		1862	Antonio Michela Zucco	Italian	Used in the Italian Senate and the Regional Council of Piedmont.
Moat's Short-hand Standard		1833	Thomas Moat	English	
Munson Shorthand		1867	James Eugene Munson	English	
National Simplex Shorthand		1919	Rev. Percival Hubert Chase	English	
Natural Shorthand		1917	August Mengelkamp	English	
New Art of Real Shorthand		1919	John Malham-Dembleby	English	
New Rapid		1890	C.E. McKee		
Notescript		1964	Laurence F. Hawkins	English	
Paragon Shorthand		1895	A. Lichtentag		
Personal Shorthand			Carl W. Salser, C. Theo Yerian and Mark R. Salser	English	Originally called "Briefhand."
Pitman Shorthand		1837	Isaac Pitman	English	
Polygraphy		1747	Aulay Macaulay	English	
Prévost-Delaunay Shorthand		1878	Hippolyte Prévost and Albert Delaunay	French	
Reformed Phonetic Short-Hand		1868	Andrew J. Marsh	English	
Scheithauer Shorthand		1896	Karl Friedrich Scheithauer	German	Used in Germany.
Scheithauer/Steinmetz Shorthand		2020	Markus Steinmetz	German	Used in Germany.
Short-Writing		1690	Theophilus Metcalfe	English	
Simson Shorthand		1881	James Simson	English	
Speedwriting		1924	Emma Dearborn	English	
State Unified Stenography System (GESS)		1937	Nikolai Nikolaevich Sokolov	Russian	Used in the Soviet Union; also adapted for English, French, and some of the languages of the Soviet Union.
Stenographie		1618	John Willis	English	
Stenography Compleated		1727	James Weston	English	
Stenoscript		1950	Manuel C. Avancena	English	
Stiefografie		1966	Helmut Stief	German	Used in Germany.
SuperWrite					
Swiftograph		1893	Fant Abbott	English	
Tachygraphy		1626	Thomas Shelton	English, French, German	Originally called "Short-Writing."
Taylor shorthand		1786	Samuel Taylor	English	Also known as Universal Stenography
Teeline Shorthand		1968	James Hill	English	
Thomas Natural Shorthand		1935	Charles A. Thomas	English	
Tironian notes		63 BC	Marcus Tullius Tiro	Latin	
Typed Shorthand		1917	William Baines	English	Also known as Baines' Typed Shorthand.
Universal English Shorthand		about 1740	John Byrom	English	
Wang-Krogdahl's system		1936	Leif Wang and Olav Krogdahl	Norwegian	Used in the Norwegian parliament.
Weston's Short-hand		1727	James Weston	English	
Zeiglographia		1650	Thomas Shelton	English	
Phillips Code		1879	Walter P. Phillips	English	Intended for English transmitted over Telegraph in Morse code.
Evans Basic English Code		1947	John Evans	English	Based on the earlier Phillips Code but for more general use.
