= List of creators of writing systems =

This is an alphabetical list of any individuals, legendary or real, who are purported by traditions to have invented alphabets or other writing systems, whether this is proven or not.

== A ==
- Heinrich Cornelius Agrippa – German alchemist, created the Transitus Fluvii, Malachim, and Celestial Alphabets, c. 1525.
- Guru Angad – Sikh Guru, ascribed invention of Gurmukhi script c. 1539 according to tradition.
- Anigouran – Tuareg folk hero, ascribed invention of Tifinagh according to tradition

== B ==
- Celadet Bedir Khan – Kurd linguist, developed Bedirxan alphabet in 1932.
- Alexander Melville Bell – American teacher, invented Visible Speech in 1867
- Anton Bezenšek – Slovenian linguist, developed Bezenšek Shorthand c. 1879
- Charles K. Bliss – Australian engineer, invented Blissymbolics c. 1949.
- Lako Bodra – Indian railway clerk and community leader. Invented the Warang Citi script in the mid-1900s.
- Robert Boyd – American, invented Boyd's Syllabic Shorthand in 1903.
- Louis Braille – French teacher, invented Braille writing around 1821.
- Frédéric Bruly Bouabré – Ivorian artist, invented the Bété syllabary in the mid-1950s.
- Momolu Duwalu Bukele – Liberian, invented Vai syllabary around 1833.
- John Byrom – British poet, invented a system of shorthand c. 1715.

== C ==
- Cadmus – legendary Phoenician prince, ascribed invention of Greek alphabet c. 1350 BC (?) according to tradition.
- Cangjie – legendary Chinese scribe, also ascribed invention of Chinese characters c. 2650 BC (?) according to tradition.
- Carmenta – legendary Roman prophetess and mother of Evander, ascribed adoption of Greek alphabet to Latin alphabet c. 1250 BC (?) according to tradition.
- Chao Yuen Ren – Chinese-American linguist, led the development of Gwoyeu Romatzyh in 1925–6.
- Saint Clement of Ohrid – Archbishop, ascribed invention of Cyrillic c. 900, according to tradition.
- Saint Cyril – Byzantine monk, believed to have created Glagolitic alphabet c. 863.

== D ==
- John Dee – English alchemist and mathematician, invented an Enochian alphabet (not to be confused with that of Pantheus) c. 1582.
- Émile Duployé – French abbot, inventor of Duployan shorthand, 1868.
- Reginald John Garfield Dutton – British, invented Dutton Speedwords shorthand in 1922.

== E ==
- C.C. Elian (artist) – invented Elian script, c. 1980s, a transformation of the Latin alphabet into lines and dashes, allowing for multiple variations of the same word.
- Enmerkar – legendary Sumerian king, ascribed invention of cuneiform c. 2300 BC (?) according to Enmerkar and the Lord of Aratta epic.
- Enos – Biblical patriarch, ascribed introduction of consonantal Ge'ez alphabet c. 3350 BC (?) according to tradition.
- James Evans – Canadian missionary, invented a syllabary used for Ojibwe and Cree c. 1840, these days referred to as Cree syllabics.

== F ==
- Scott Fahlman – American computer scientist, proposed the first smiley emoticon in 1982.
- Assane Faye – Senegalese, invented the Garay alphabet for Wolof, 1961.
- Fenius Farsa – legendary Scythian king, ascribed invention of Ogham writing c. 2000 BC (?) according to tradition.
- Benjamin Franklin – American statesman, developed Benjamin Franklin's phonetic alphabet c. 1768.
- Frumentius – Syrian saint who converted the African kingdom of Aksum to Christianity, traditionally credited with development of consonantal Ge'ez script into vocalic Ge'ez script in the mid 4th-century.
- Fu Hsi – legendary Chinese king, ascribed invention of Chinese characters c. 2850 BC (?) according to tradition.

== G ==
- Franz Xaver Gabelsberger – German secretary, invented Gabelsberger shorthand around 1817.
- Mangei Gomango – Indian, invented Sorang Sompeng script in 1936.
- John Robert Gregg – Irish author, invented Gregg Shorthand c. 1888.
- Gregory of Durrës – Albanian monk, ascribed invention of the Elbasan script c. 1761

== H ==
- Thomas Harriot – English mathematician, invented phonetic alphabet for transcribing Carolina Algonquian language in 1584.
- Hemadpant – A scholar from ancient India and Prime Minister in Yadava Dynasty, according to one theory invented the Modi Script that was used to write Marathi Language till 19th century before Devanagari was officially adopted to write Marathi.
- Hildegard of Bingen – German nun, invented Litterae ignotae c. 1150.
- Honorius of Thebes – possibly mythical author, ascribed invention of Theban alphabet c. 1220 (?).

== K ==
- Hussein Sheikh Ahmed Kaddare – Somali, invented Kaddare script c. 1953.
- Kisimi Kamara – Sierra Leonean tailor, invented Mende syllabary, Ki-ka-ku, in 1921.
- Solomana Kante – Guinean author, invented the N'Ko alphabet in 1949.
- Vuk Stefanović Karadžić, Serbian linguist, developed Serbian Cyrillic alphabet c. 1818, adapting Cyrillic alphabet.
- Osman Yusuf Kenadid – Somali, invented Osmanya script c. 1921.
- Muḥammad ibn Mūsā al-Khwārizmī – Persian mathematician, helped codify the Hindu–Arabic numeral system c. 825
- Ong Kommandam – Laotian freedom fighter, developed the Khom script, first used 1926.
- Kūkai – Japanese monk, ascribed invention of Kana syllabary c. 806, according to tradition.
- Shigetaka Kurita – Japanese designer, created the NTT DoCoMo emoji set.

== L ==
- Jean-Marie-Raphaël Le Jeune – Canadian, created Chinook writing, 1893, an adaptation and expansion of Duployan.
- Francis Lodwick – Dutch linguist, invented Universal Alphabet in 1686.
- Karl Richard Lepsius – German linguist, developed Standard Alphabet by Lepsius c. 1855.
- Lontanna Igwe Onduze – Nigerian software designer and artist, created the Ndèbe script c. 2008.

== M ==
- Mani – Ancient Iranian prophet, invented Manichaean alphabet
- Aulay Macaulay – English tea-dealer, who invented Polygraphy, a system of shorthand in 1747.
- John R. Malone – American, developed the UNIFON alphabet c. 1955.
- Mesrop Mashtots – Armenian monk, created the Armenian alphabet in c. 405.
- Olof Melin – Swedish colonel, invented Melin Shorthand c. 1880.
- Mongkut – Thai king, invented the Ariyaka script c. 1840s
- Thomas More – English author, invented Utopian alphabet in 1516.
- Adrien-Gabriel Morice – French, developed Carrier syllabary c. 1885.
- Samuel F. B. Morse – American inventor, invented Morse code c. 1835.
- Pandit Raghunath Murmu – Indian, created Ol Chiki script in 1925.

== N ==
- Ibrahim Njoya – King of Bamum (Cameroon), invented Bamum script c. 1910.
- Nurhaci (king), or possibly his translators Erdeni and Gagai ? – Manchurians, created Manchu alphabet in 1599.

== O ==
- Odin/*Wōdanaz – the chief god in Scandinavian/Germanic paganism. Associated in the Hávamál with the origins of the Runic alphabet Futhark (Later Futhorc).
- Ogma – legendary Irish deified chieftain, also ascribed invention of Ogham writing c. 1875 BC (?) according to tradition.

== P ==
- Zaya Pandita – – Oirat lama, developed Todo script in 1648.
- Paracelsus – Swiss alchemist, invented Alphabet of the Magi c. 1520.
- Chögyal Phagpa – Tibetan monk, invented Phagspa script in 1269.
- Pharnavaz I of Iberia – Iberian king, ascribed development of Georgian alphabet in 284 BC, according to tradition.
- Francisco de Pina, and other Portuguese missionaries – created the Vietnamese alphabet c. 1620s.
- Isaac Pitman – British teacher, invented Pitman shorthand in 1837.
- Sam Pollard – British missionary, invented Pollard script in 1905.
- Parley P. Pratt – American Mormon leader, developed Deseret alphabet with George D. Watt c. 1855.
- George Psalmanazar – European impostor and scholar, invented a (fraudulent) Formosan alphabet in 1704.

== R ==
- Ram Khamhaeng the Great – Thai king, ascribed invention of Thai alphabet in 1283, according to tradition.
- Ronald Kingsley Read – British, invented the Shavian (early 1960s) and Quikscript (1966) writing systems.
- Jeremiah Rich – English, invented a system of shorthand in 1654.
- Ríg – (identified as Heimdall) gave the runes to his son, Jarl (Poetic Edda poem Rígsþula) Runic alphabet Futhark (Later Futhorc) c. 150 AD (?) per tradition.
- Alexandre de Rhodes – Avignonese missionary, developed Vietnamese alphabet c. 1625, basing on works by Portuguese missionaries such as Francisco de Pina.

== S ==
- Carl W. Salser – American teacher, developed Personal Shorthand with C. Theo Yerian. c. 1955.
- Bakri Sapalo – Oromo poet, writer, and teacher from Ethiopia, invented an alphasyllabic script for the Oromo language c. 1956.
- Johann Martin Schleyer – created three letters (ꞛ, ꞝ, and ꞟ) for his international auxiliary language Volapük at the end of the 19th century.
- Sejong the Great – Korean king of Joseon, invented Hangul writing in c. 1443, promulgated in 1446.
- Seol Chong – inventor of the Korean Idu script and Gugyeol script (c. 650 – c. 730), according to tradition.
- Sequoyah, Cherokee silversmith, invented Cherokee syllabary c. 1819.
- Seth, son of Adam, is mentioned in the Chronicle of Malalas as being the "first to invent Hebrew script and to write with it"
- Sheikh Abdurahman Sheikh Nuur – Somali, invented Borama script c. 1933.
- Srinivasa Chakravarthy – Indian researcher, led the creation of the Bharati script (2016)
- Thomas Shelton – English translator, developed Short Writing, an early shorthand, in 1626.
- Tonpa Shenrab Miwoche – Tibetan religious teacher of uncertain historicity, ascribed creation of the Dongba script by religious fables.
- Shong Lue Yang – Hmong, created Pahawh Hmong alphabet in 1959
- Kai Staats – American filmmaker, created iConji in 2010.
- Stephen of Perm – Russian missionary, invented the Old Permic alphabet in 1372.
- Valerie Sutton – American choreographer, developed MovementWriting for transcribing dance in 1972 and SignWriting for transcribing sign languages in 1974.

== T ==
- Tata-tonga was a 13th-century Uyghur scribe captured by Genghis Khan from the Naimans and involved in bringing and adapting the Old Uyghur alphabet to the Mongolian Plateau in the form of the Mongolian script (Mongol bichig or hudum bichig). After his capture, he was invited to teach the Old Uyghur alphabet to members of the court, including the Khan's sons.
- Taautus, legendary inventor of the Phoenician alphabet
- Samuel Taylor – British, invented Universal Stenography system of shorthand in 1792.
- Tenevil – Chukchi reindeer herder, developed a writing system for Chukchi language c. 1931.
- Charles Allen Thomas – invented Thomas Natural Shorthand in 1935.
- Thonmi Sambhota – legendary Tibetan scribe, ascribed invention of Tibetan script c. 650, according to tradition.
- Thoth – mythical Egyptian deity, ascribed invention of Egyptian hieroglyphics c. 3000 BC (?) according to tradition.
- John William Tims – Missionary, developed Blackfoot syllabary c. 1890.
- Marcus Tullius Tiro – Roman secretary, ascribed invention of Tironian notes shorthand c. 63 BC, according to tradition.
- J. R. R. Tolkien – British author, invented the Tengwar, Cirth and Sarati c. 1930
- Johannes Trithemius – German cryptographer, invented an "Angelic" (magical) alphabet in 1499.

== U ==
- Ulfilas, Goth missionary, believed to have invented Gothic alphabet c. 350 AD, according to tradition.
- Uyaquk – Yupik (Alaska Native) missionary, invented Yugtun script c. 1900.

== V ==
- Naum Veqilharxhi – Albanian, invented the Vithkuqi alphabet in 1845.

== W ==
- Wanyan Xiyin – Manchurian scribe, invented Jurchen script in 1120.
- William Bell Wait – American teacher, invented New York Point system in 1868.
- Diedrich Westermann – German missionary, developed Africa Alphabet in 1928.
- George D. Watt – American Mormon leader, developed Deseret alphabet with Parley P. Pratt c. 1855.
- W. John (or John W.) Weilgart – Austrian-born American psychoanalyst and philosopher; creator of the philosophical language aUI and its writing system.
- John Wilkins – English academic. Invented the so-called 'real character' as a writing system for a proposed Philosophical language in 1668.

== Y ==
- Yeli Renrong – Tangut scholar, invented Tangut script in 1036.
- Yelü Diela – Manchurian scribe, ascribed creation of Khitan small script c. 925.

== Z ==
- Zhang Binglin – Chinese linguist, invented shorthand that was developed into Zhuyin in 1913.
- Zhou Youguang – Chinese linguist, invented Pinyin romanisation, 1958
- Öndör Gegeen Zanabazar – Mongolian monk, created Soyombo script in 1686 and Zanabazar square script.

== See also ==
- List of constructed scripts
- List of writing systems
- List of language creators
