= Wang-Krogdahl shorthand =

Form of shorthand used in Norway

Wang-Krogdahl
- Script type: Shorthand
- Creator: Leif Wang and Olav Krogdahl
- Published: 1936
- Period: 1936-
- Languages: Norwegian

Related scripts
- Parent systems: German Unified Shorthand (Deutsche Einheitskurzschrift): Wang-Krogdahl

Wang-Krogdahl is a form of shorthand.

== Development ==
Shorthand was only introduced in Norway when it became necessary to record the proceedings of the Norwegian parliament (Stortinget) in a more reliable and official manner from the middle of the 19th century onwards. In 1857, 14 shorthand writers were finally hired following an 1845 command by King Oscar I. In the beginning an old Swedish system was used (Götrek's; a geometrical system), but once the news of Gabelsberger's system reached Norway in 1865 a switch was inevitable. Gabelsberger's system remained the dominant system of shorthand in Norway for a hundred years. However, because of the increasing demand for and popularity of shorthand from the 1930s onwards, a need for a simpler system arose.

This demand was met primarily by Leif Wang and Olav Krogdahl, who were teachers of shorthand. They simplified Gabelsberger's system, using the German unified system (Einheitskurzschrift) and others as guidelines. Their first book was published in 1936, but it only caught on gradually. Today, however, it is the only system used by the reporters in the Norwegian parliament. No shorthand machines have been made for the Norwegian language; all proceedings are reported by hand. From 2009 the parliament will no longer train shorthand writers; proceedings will (gradually) be recorded electronically in the future.

Due to the use of dictaphones and computers, shorthand is not in use in Norway other than in the parliament.
