= Merrill Shorthand =

- Script type: geometric syllabic shorthand
- Creator: Albert H. Merrill
- Published: 1942
- Languages: English

Merrill Shorthand is a shorthand system invented by Albert H. Merrill, published in 1942.

The system is described in Merrill's book as "A shorthand system built on an original principle of connecting consonant-indicating positions by vowel-indicating curves and straight lines." The system differs from Boyd's Syllabic Shorthand, which is another system which attempts to use a syllabic basis, in a number of ways:

- While both Boyd's and Merrill's system use differently shaped strokes to represent different vowels, Boyd's has different terminators for different vowels; Merrill uses five different basic lines: deeply curved (upward and downward), shallow curved (upward and downward) and straight.
- Consonants in Boyd's system are shown, in the main, by orientation (horizontal, vertical, or 45° from those directions) and direction of writing. In Merrill, they are shown by position above, below, or on the writing line; also, in Merrill a syllable such as "lad" which starts and ends with a consonant is written on a slant which starts at the height associated with "l" and ends at the height associated with "d." This is the only situation in which strokes are made to slant.
- Merrill, unlike Boyd, resembles Pitman shorthand in using dark "shaded" strokes to represent certain (mainly voiced) consonants, as opposed to others (mainly unvoiced).

The vowels are grouped into five sets:

1. Deeply curved, upward (inverted-u-shaped): load, but.
2. More shallowly curved, upward: bead, bid.
3. Straight: bawl, hot, fat.
4. Shallowly curved, downward (u-shaped): bed, made.
5. Deeply curved, downward: use, moon, good, fine.

(Oddly, in all but the last case, the vowels grouped together sound somewhat similar; however, the last group has three similar sounds, but a fourth very unlike the others.)

The consonants are grouped into three sets, "left," "right," and "extreme right." The extreme right consonants are used only to end syllables, not to begin them. When a right consonant begins a syllable, a space is put before it which is absent when the consonant is in the left group. The ending consonant of the syllable controls how far rightward the stroke that represents the syllable is extended: thus "lad" is a straight line from the highest position to the writing line, only slightly rightward, while "lawn" has a stroke that runs between the same heights, but with a larger forward dimension. The positions are as follows:

Height	Left	Right	Extreme right
Highest	w (l)	f (v)	ft
Above writing line	h (r)	p (b)	sp
On writing line	t (d)	n (m)	m (mp)
Below writing line	s (z)	k (g)	sk (nk)
Far below writing line	th	ch (j)	sh
Lowest (only one entry!)	nt		

The parenthesized entries are represented by shaded strokes.

A later edition was published in 1945 under the title "Merrill's Modernized Shorthand."
