= Sophie Scott (inventor) =

German stenographer and inventor

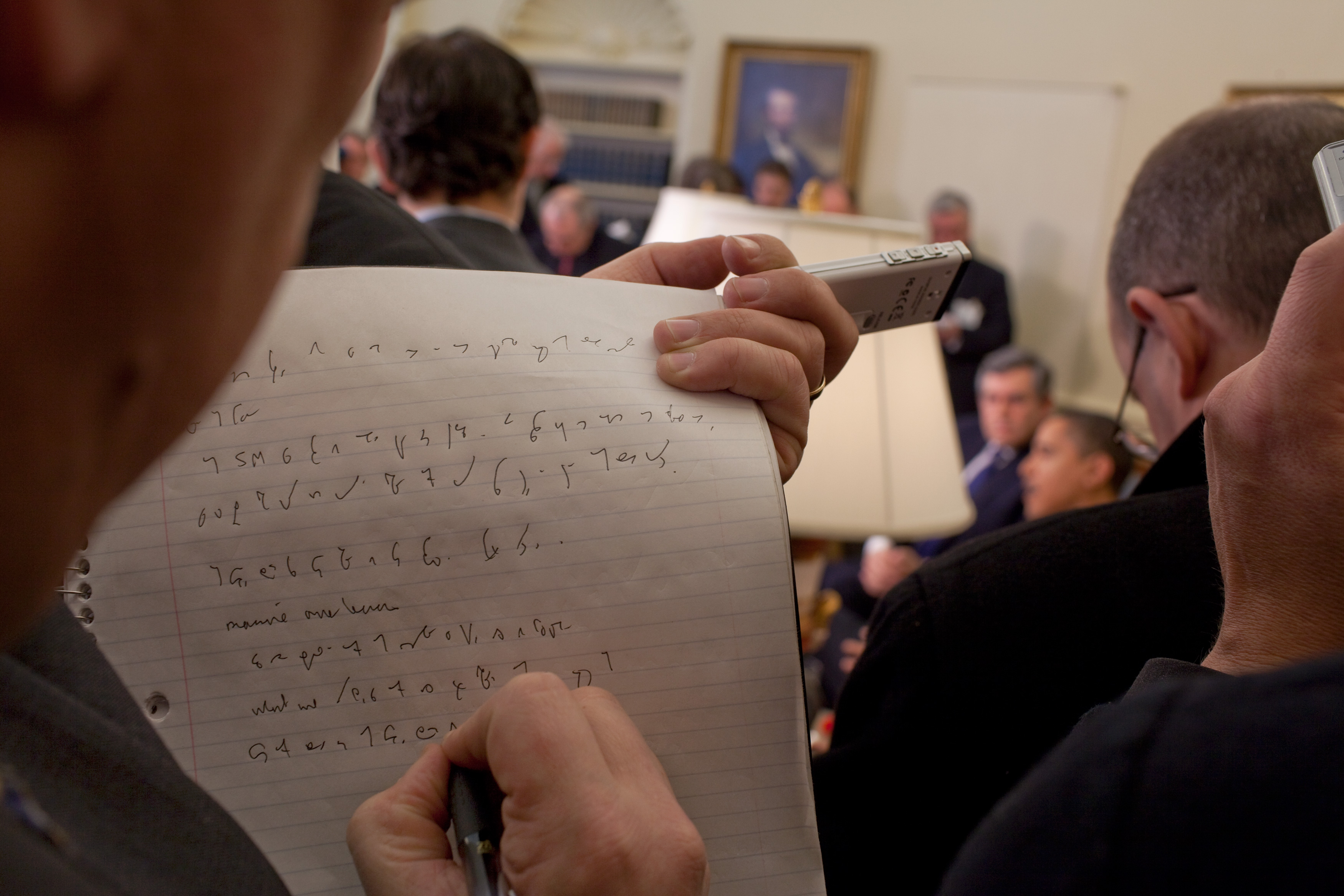
White House reporter taking notes in a type of shorthand. (2009) (Official White House photo by Pete Souza)

Sophie Scott (birth and death unknown) was the pseudonym of the female inventor of a kind of shorthand system for the German language. She described her method in a book published in Vienna in 1831 under the title Homographie, which lists the author as Lady Sophie Scott. Shorthand, is an abbreviated symbolic method of writing that, when it's compared to longhand, is much faster.

== Biography ==
Scott's true identity remains unknown. In the preface to the 1831 instruction book describing her method of shorthand, she acknowledges her pride in her invention saying: "This one-of-a-kind invention stands as a consummate masterpiece, defying all the most lauded shorthand; it is unattainable and surpasses them all. Perhaps the world will never know my real name, but the name Sophie Scott will be passed from mouth to mouth in the future, never to be forgotten... The world will be convinced that I was born on English soil. I wish I had as many hands to write with as I have new ideas and inventions."

A German musical lexicon source describes Scott's shorthand this way:

"Each syllable is represented by a vertical line, to which dots or small horizontal lines are added at five possible positions, from whose position vowels and consonants can be read. This writing system is also said to be ideally suited as musical notation: The vertical line represents the individual note, the dots and horizontal lines indicate its position and duration. With this new script, "every child [...] could play in all existing keys with the same ease within ten minutes." Such and other imaginative remarks, such as the observation that an upside-down sheet of music would also produce "an equally beautiful composition," reach the limits of seriousness, as do other curious suggestions. The new script never achieved any practical significance."

Scott was so convinced of the benefits of her stenographic tool that she asked everyone to disseminate, recognize, participate in, and support her new writing method. Even at that time, there were many types of shorthand; Scott's work belonged to the group of so-called "positional systems with punctuated vowel representation." Small horizontal or diagonal strokes are added to a straight stroke (a vertical bar). The consonants were designated by the position of these horizontal or diagonal lines. Vowels were indicated by a dot or a very small vertical or horizontal line at different heights. Sophie Scott offered 100 ducats to anyone who could suggest improvements to her system.

== See also ==
- List of shorthand systems
