= Bezenškovo Bukovje =

Bezenškovo Bukovje Bukovje (until 1953)
- Location in Slovenia
- Coordinates: 46°19′40.21″N 15°19′45.28″E
- Country: Slovenia
- Traditional region: Styria
- Statistical region: Savinja
- Municipality: Vojnik

Area
  - Total: 1.12 km^{2} (0.43 sq mi)
- Elevation: 413.6 m (1,357 ft)

Population (2002)
  - Total: 104

Bezenškovo Bukovje (pronounced [ˈbeːzənʃkɔʋɔ buˈkoːu̯jɛ]) is a settlement in the Municipality of Vojnik in eastern Slovenia. It lies in the hills east of Frankolovo off the main road from Vojnik to Slovenske Konjice. The area is part of the traditional region of Styria. It is now included with the rest of the municipality in the Savinja Statistical Region.

== Name ==
The name of the settlement was changed from Bukovje to Bezenškovo Bukovje in 1953.

== Cultural heritage ==
A small chapel shrine in the village was built in 1897 at the initiative of Anton Bezenšek.

== Notable people ==
Notable people that were born or lived in Bezenškovo Bukovje include:

- Anton Bezenšek (1854–1915), linguist and shorthand expert
