= Ideogram =

Symbol that represents an idea or concept

An ideogram or ideograph (from Greek idéa 'idea' + gráphō 'to write') is a symbol that is used within a given writing system to represent an idea or concept in a given language. (Ideograms are contrasted with phonograms, which indicate sounds of speech and thus are independent of any particular language.) Some ideograms are more arbitrary than others: some are only meaningful assuming preexisting familiarity with some convention; others more directly resemble their signifieds. Ideograms that represent physical objects by visually illustrating them are called pictograms.

- Numerals and mathematical symbols are ideograms, for example ⟨1⟩ 'one', ⟨2⟩ 'two', ⟨+⟩ 'plus', and ⟨=⟩ 'equals'.
- The ampersand ⟨&⟩ is used in many languages to represent the word and, originally a stylized ligature of the Latin word et.
- Other typographical examples include ⟨§⟩ 'section', ⟨€⟩ 'euro', ⟨£⟩ 'pound sterling', and ⟨©⟩ 'copyright'.

== Terminology ==
=== Logograms ===
Ideograms are not to be equated with logograms, which represent specific morphemes in a language. In a broad sense, ideograms may form part of a writing system otherwise based on other principles, like the examples above in the phonetic English writing system—while also potentially representing the same idea across several languages, as they do not correspond to a specific spoken word. There may not always be a single way to read a given ideograph. While remaining logograms assigned to morphemes, specific Chinese characters like ⟨中⟩ 'middle' may be classified as ideographs in a narrower sense, given their origin and visual structure.

=== Pictograms and indicatives ===
Pictograms, depending on the definition, are ideograms that represent an idea either through a direct iconic resemblance to what is being referenced, or otherwise more broadly visually represent or illustrate it. In proto-writing systems, pictograms generally comprised most of the available symbols. Their use could also be extended via the rebus principle: for example, the pictorial Dongba symbols without Geba annotation cannot represent the Naxi language, but are used as a mnemonic for the recitation of oral literature. Some systems also use indicatives, which denote abstract concepts. Sometimes, the word ideogram is used to refer exclusively to indicatives, contrasting them with pictograms.

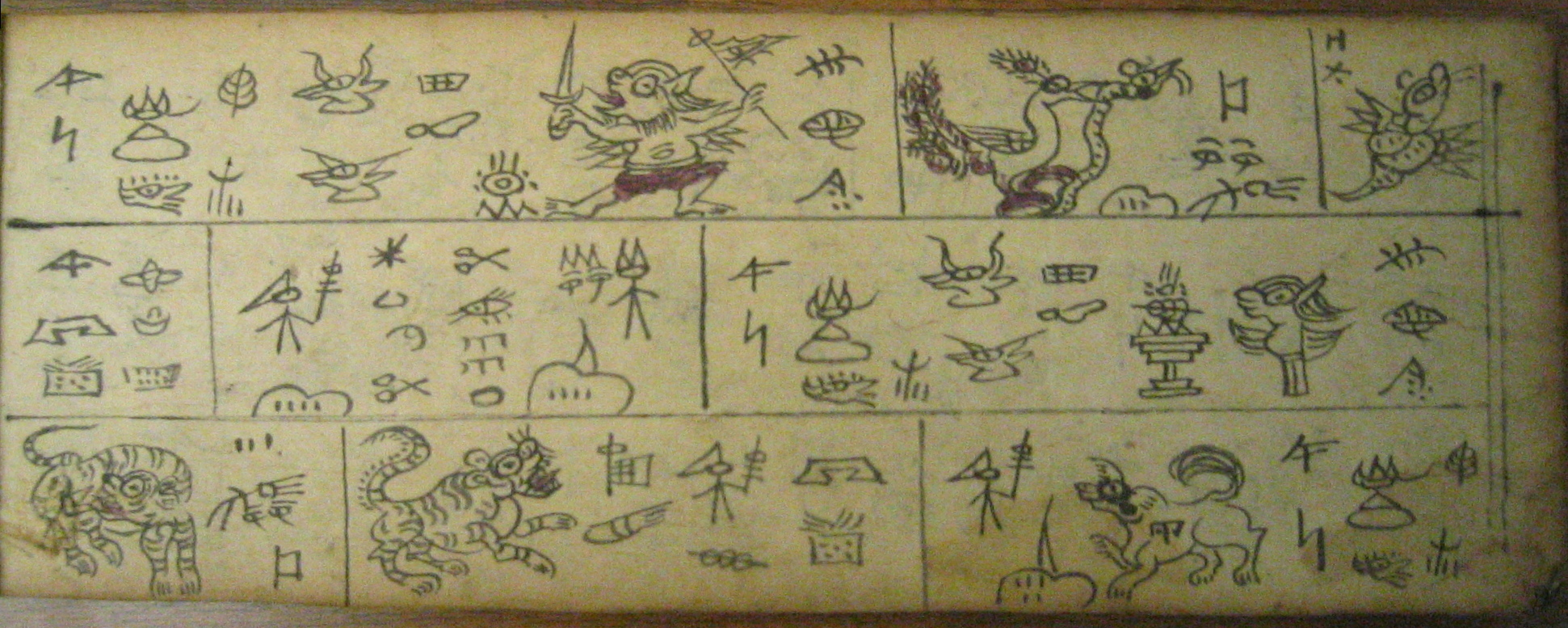
Dongba symbols, used by the Nakhi people as a mnemonic in reciting oral literature

Comparative evolution of cuneiform, Egyptian hieroglyphs, and Chinese characters

The word ideogram has historically often been used to describe Egyptian hieroglyphs, Sumerian cuneiform, and Chinese characters. However, these symbols represent semantic elements of a language, and not the underlying ideas directly—their use generally requires knowledge of a specific spoken language. Modern scholars refer to these symbols instead as logograms, and generally avoid calling them ideograms. Most logograms include some representation of the pronunciation of the corresponding word in the language, often using the rebus principle. Later systems used selected symbols to represent the sounds of the language, such as the adaptation of the logogram for ʾālep 'ox' as the letter aleph representing the initial glottal stop. However, some logograms still meaningfully depict the meaning of the morpheme they represent visually. Pictograms are shaped like the object that the word refers to, such as an icon of a bull denoting the Semitic word ʾālep 'ox'. Other logograms may visually represent meaning via more abstract techniques.

Many Egyptian hieroglyphs and cuneiform graphs could be used either logographically or phonetically. For example, the Sumerian dingir ⟨𒀭⟩ could represent the word diĝir 'deity', the god An or the word an 'sky'. In Akkadian, the graph ⟨⟩ could represent the stem il- 'deity', the word šamu 'sky', or the syllable an.

While Chinese characters generally function as logograms, three of the six classes in the traditional classification are ideographic (or semantographic) in origin, as they have no phonetic component:

- Pictograms (象形 xiàngxíng) are generally among the oldest characters, with forms dating to the 12th century BC. Generally, with the evolution of the script, the forms of pictographs became less directly representational, to the extent that their referents are no longer plausible to intuit. Examples include ⟨田⟩ 'field', and ⟨心⟩ 'heart'.
- Indicatives (指事字 zhǐshìzì) like ⟨上⟩ 'up' and ⟨下⟩ 'down', or numerals like ⟨三⟩ 'three'.
- Ideographic compounds (会意字 huìyìzì) have a meaning synthesized from several other characters, such as ⟨明⟩ 'bright', a compound of ⟨日⟩ 'Sun' and ⟨月⟩ 'Moon', or ⟨休⟩ 'rest', composed of ⟨人⟩ 'person' and ⟨木⟩ 'tree'. As the understanding of Old Chinese phonology developed during the second half of the 20th century, many researchers became convinced that the etymology of most characters originally thought to be ideographic compounds actually included some phonetic component.

Example of ideograms are the DOT pictograms, a collection of 50 symbols developed during the 1970s by the American Institute of Graphic Arts at the request of the United States Department of Transportation. Initially used to mark airports, the system gradually became more widespread.

=== Pure signs ===
Many ideograms only represent ideas by convention. For example, a red octagon only carries the meaning of 'stop' due to the public association and reification of that meaning over time. In the field of semiotics, these are a type of pure sign, a term which also includes symbols using non-graphical media. Modern analysis of Chinese characters reveals that pure signs are as old as the system itself, with prominent examples including the numerals representing numbers larger than four, including ⟨五⟩ 'five', and ⟨八⟩ 'eight'. These do not indicate anything about the quantities they represent visually or phonetically, only conventionally.

== Types ==
=== Mathematical notation ===
A mathematical symbol is a type of ideogram.

== History ==
As true writing systems emerged from systems of pure ideograms, later societies with phonetic writing were often compelled by the intuitive connection between pictures, diagrams and logograms—though ultimately ignorant of the latter's necessary phonetic dimension. Greek speakers began regularly visiting Egypt during the 7th century BC. Ancient Greek writers generally mistook the Egyptian writing system to be purely ideographic. According to tradition, the Greeks had acquired the ability to write, among other things, from the Egyptians through Pythagoras (c. 570 – c. 495 BC), who had been directly taught their silent form of "symbolic teaching". Beginning with Plato (428–347 BC), the conception of hieroglyphs as ideograms was rooted in a broader philosophical conception of most language as an imperfect and obfuscatory image of reality. The views of Plato involved an ontologically separate world of forms, but those of his student Aristotle (384–322 BC) instead saw the forms as abstracts, identical in the mind of every person. For both, ideography was a more perfect representation of the forms possessed by the Egyptians. The Aristotelian framework would be the foundation for the conception of language in the Mediterranean world into the medieval era.

According to the classical theory, because ideographs directly reflected the forms, they were the only "true language", and had the unique ability to communicate arcane wisdom to readers. The ability to read Egyptian hieroglyphs had been lost during late antiquity, in the context of the country's Hellenization and Christianization. However, the traditional notion that the latter trends compelled the abandonment of hieroglyphic writing has been rejected by recent scholarship.

Europe only became fully acquainted with written Chinese near the end of the 16th century, and initially related the system to their existing framework of ideography as partially informed by Egyptian hieroglyphs. Ultimately, Jean-François Champollion's successful decipherment of hieroglyphs in 1823 stemmed from an understanding that they did represent spoken Egyptian language, as opposed to being purely ideographic. Champollion's insight in part stemmed from his familiarity with the work of French sinologist Jean-Pierre Abel-Rémusat regarding fanqie, which demonstrated that Chinese characters were often used to write sounds, and not just ideas.

=== Proposed universal languages ===
Inspired by these conceptions of ideography, several attempts have been made to design a universal written language—i.e., an ideography whose interpretations are accessible to all people with no regard to the languages they speak. An early proposal was made in 1668 by John Wilkins in An Essay Towards a Real Character, and a Philosophical Language. More recently, Blissymbols was devised by Charles K. Bliss in 1949, and currently includes over 2,000 graphs.

== See also ==
- Character (symbol) – Character as a semiotic sign or symbol
- Emoji – Symbols for emotional cues in text
- Epigraphy – Study of inscriptions
- Flag signals – Communication using flags
- Heterogram (linguistics) – Representation of foreign words in logogram writing systems
- Lexigram – Graphic design which represents a word
- List of symbols
- List of writing systems
- Logo – Graphic mark representing an entity
- Traffic sign – Signboard displaying information for road users
- Ideographic rune – Rune as an ideogram
