= Garay (Unicode block) =

- Range: U+10D40..U+10D8F (80 code points)
- Plane: SMP
- Scripts: Garay
- Assigned: 69 code points
- Unused: 11 reserved code points

Unicode version history
- 16.0 (2024): 69 (+69)

Unicode documentation
- Code chart ∣ Web page

Garay is a Unicode block containing letters for the Garay alphabet, developed in 1961 and used as a way to write the Wolof language.

Garay^{[1]}^{[2]} Official Unicode Consortium code chart (PDF)
	0	1	2	3	4	5	6	7	8	9	A	B	C	D	E	F
U+10D4x	𐵀	𐵁	𐵂	𐵃	𐵄	𐵅	𐵆	𐵇	𐵈	𐵉	𐵊	𐵋	𐵌	𐵍	𐵎	𐵏
U+10D5x	𐵐	𐵑	𐵒	𐵓	𐵔	𐵕	𐵖	𐵗	𐵘	𐵙	𐵚	𐵛	𐵜	𐵝	𐵞	𐵟
U+10D6x	𐵠	𐵡	𐵢	𐵣	𐵤	𐵥				𐵩	𐵪	𐵫	𐵬	𐵭	𐵮	𐵯
U+10D7x	𐵰	𐵱	𐵲	𐵳	𐵴	𐵵	𐵶	𐵷	𐵸	𐵹	𐵺	𐵻	𐵼	𐵽	𐵾	𐵿
U+10D8x	𐶀	𐶁	𐶂	𐶃	𐶄	𐶅									𐶎	𐶏
Notes: 1. As of Unicode version 16.0; 2. Grey areas indicate non-assigned code points

== History ==
The following Unicode-related documents record the purpose and process of defining specific characters in the Garay block:

Version	Final code points (Note: Proposed code points and characters names may differ from final code points and names)	Count	L2 ID	WG2 ID	Document
16.0	U+10D40..10D65, 10D69..10D85, 10D8E..10D8F	69	L2/11-181	N4044	Pandey, Anshuman (2011-05-09), Introducing the Wolof Alphabet of Assane Faye
16.0	U+10D40..10D65, 10D69..10D85, 10D8E..10D8F	69	L2/12-139	N4261	Everson, Michael (2012-04-26), Preliminary proposal for encoding the Garay script in the SMP of the UCS
16.0	U+10D40..10D65, 10D69..10D85, 10D8E..10D8F	69	L2/13-028		Anderson, Deborah; McGowan, Rick; Whistler, Ken; Pournader, Roozbeh (2013-01-28), "21", Recommendations to UTC on Script Proposals
16.0	U+10D40..10D65, 10D69..10D85, 10D8E..10D8F	69	L2/16-069	N4709	Everson, Michael (2016-03-22), Proposal for encoding the Garay script in the SMP of the UCS
16.0	U+10D40..10D65, 10D69..10D85, 10D8E..10D8F	69	L2/16-156		Anderson, Deborah; Whistler, Ken; Pournader, Roozbeh; Glass, Andrew; Iancu, Laurențiu (2016-05-06), "8. Garay", Recommendations to UTC #147 May 2016 on Script Proposals
16.0	U+10D40..10D65, 10D69..10D85, 10D8E..10D8F	69		N4873R (pdf, doc)	"10.2.8 Garay script", Unconfirmed minutes of WG 2 meeting 65, 2018-03-16
16.0	U+10D40..10D65, 10D69..10D85, 10D8E..10D8F	69	L2/17-322	N4875	Riley, Charles (2017-09-09), Report on the Garay script 2017
16.0	U+10D40..10D65, 10D69..10D85, 10D8E..10D8F	69	L2/18-039		Anderson, Deborah; Whistler, Ken; Pournader, Roozbeh; Moore, Lisa; Liang, Hai; Cook, Richard (2018-01-19), "3. Garay", Recommendations to UTC #154 January 2018 on Script Proposals
16.0	U+10D40..10D65, 10D69..10D85, 10D8E..10D8F	69	L2/18-168		Anderson, Deborah; Whistler, Ken; Pournader, Roozbeh; Moore, Lisa; Liang, Hai; Chapman, Chris; Cook, Richard (2018-04-28), "Garay", Recommendations to UTC #155 April-May 2018 on Script Proposals
16.0	U+10D40..10D65, 10D69..10D85, 10D8E..10D8F	69	L2/19-163		Rovenchak, Andrij; Riley, Charles (2019-02-11), Feedback on Garay
16.0	U+10D40..10D65, 10D69..10D85, 10D8E..10D8F	69	L2/19-173		Anderson, Deborah; et al. (2019-04-29), "6. Garay", Recommendations to UTC #159 April-May 2019 on Script Proposals
16.0	U+10D40..10D65, 10D69..10D85, 10D8E..10D8F	69	L2/22-023		Anderson, Deborah; Whistler, Ken; Pournader, Roozbeh; Constable, Peter (2022-01-22), "5 Garay", Recommendations to UTC #170 January 2022 on Script Proposals
16.0	U+10D40..10D65, 10D69..10D85, 10D8E..10D8F	69	L2/22-048		Rovenchak, Andrij; Faye, Abdou Souleye; Riley, Charles L. (2022-02-19), Consideration of the encoding of Garay with updated user feedback (revised)
16.0	U+10D40..10D65, 10D69..10D85, 10D8E..10D8F	69	L2/22-068		Anderson, Deborah; Whistler, Ken; Pournader, Roozbeh; Constable, Peter (2022-04-15), "3 Garay", Recommendations to UTC #171 April 2022 on Script Proposals
16.0	U+10D40..10D65, 10D69..10D85, 10D8E..10D8F	69	L2/22-061		Constable, Peter (2022-07-27), "Consensus 171-C18", Approved Minutes of UTC Meeting 171, "Accept 69 Garay characters in a new Garay block"
16.0	U+10D40..10D65, 10D69..10D85, 10D8E..10D8F	69	L2/23-231		Constable, Peter (2023-12-08), "Section 2.2", UTC #177 Minutes
