= Samuel Taylor (stenographer) =

British stenographer

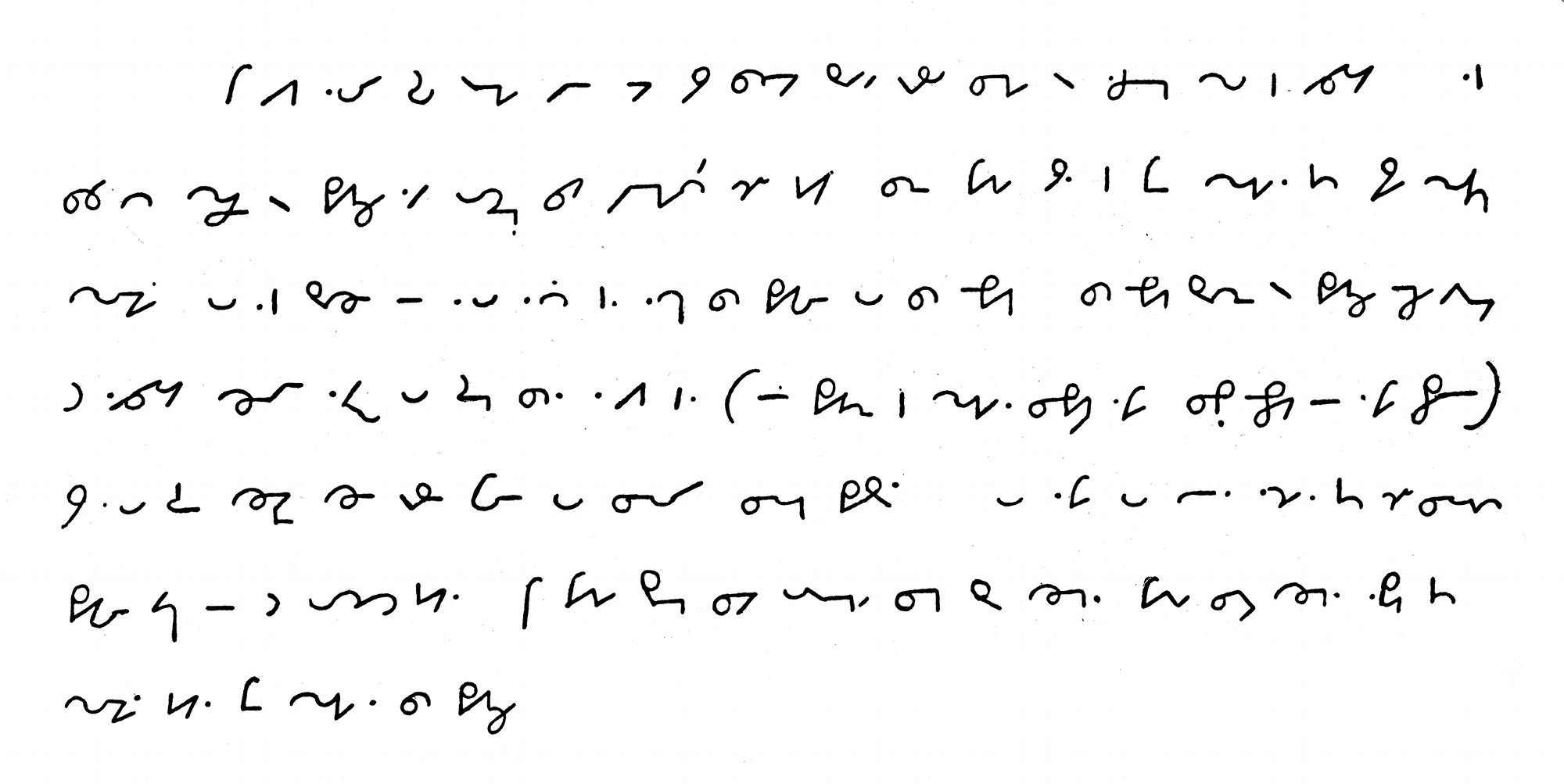
Plate XI from Samuel Taylor's shorthand book, 1786

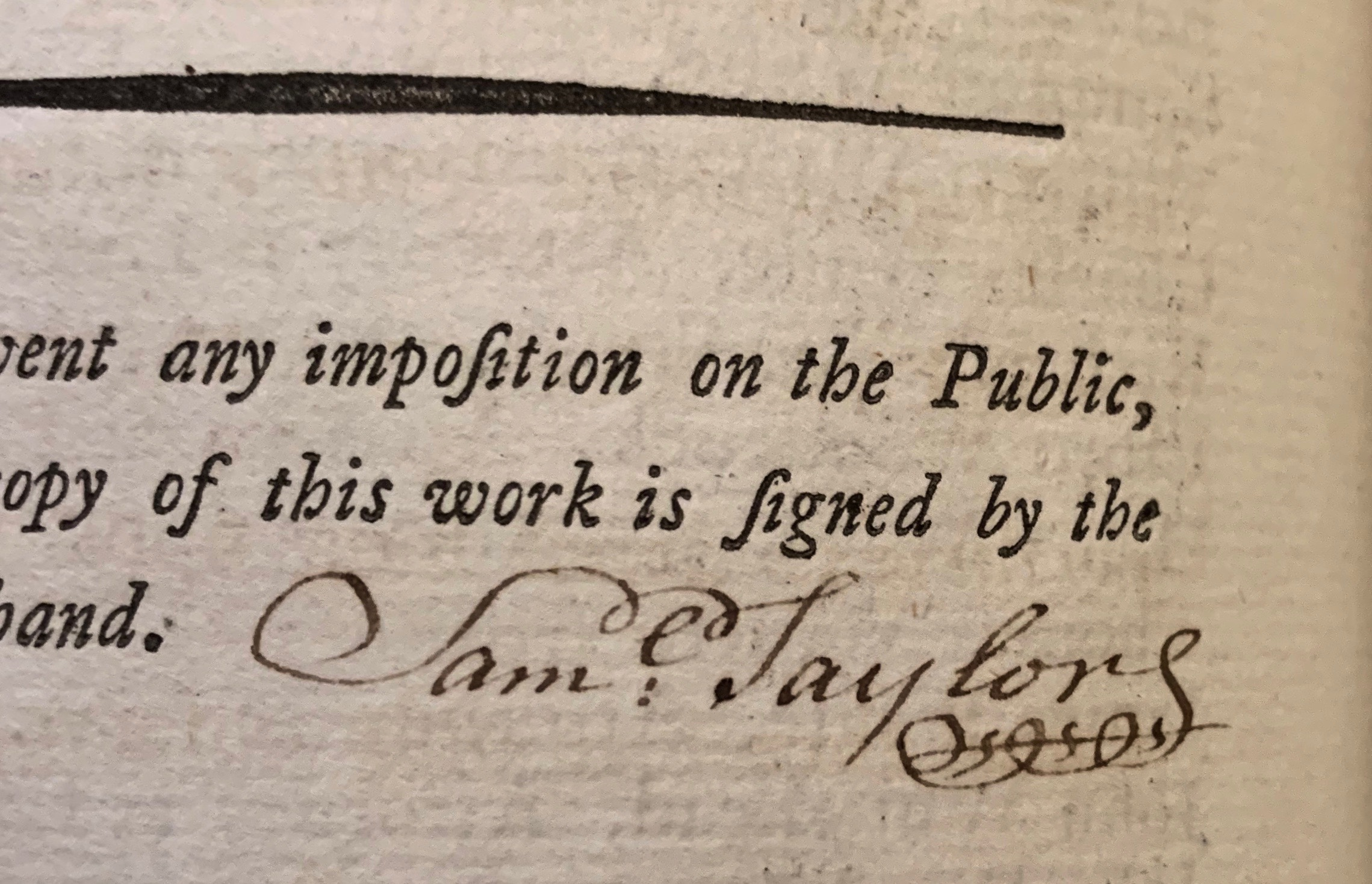
Taylor's signature, from the end of the subscribers' list of the first edition of the Essay.

Samuel Taylor (1748/49 – 1811) was the British inventor of a widely used system of stenography.

He began working on his own method of stenography in 1773, based on earlier efforts. In 1786, he published An Essay Intended to Establish a Standard for an Universal System of Stenography, or Short Hand Writing..., the first shorthand system to be used all over the English-speaking world. His stenographic method consisted in cutting out the superfluous consonants as well as the vowels in polysyllabic words. It used an alphabet composed of 19 letters of simplified shapes.

He taught stenography at Oxford as well as the universities of Scotland and Ireland for many years.

His system was adopted for several other languages, including French, German, Spanish, Italian, and Swedish. His book was translated and published in France by Théodore-Pierre Bertin in 1792 under the title Système universel et complet de Stenographie ou Manière abrégée d'écrire applicable à tous les idiomes.

He also published a book on angling in 1800, titled Angling in All Its Branches.

== See also ==
- Taylor shorthand
