= Taylor shorthand =

Geometric shorthand published in 1786

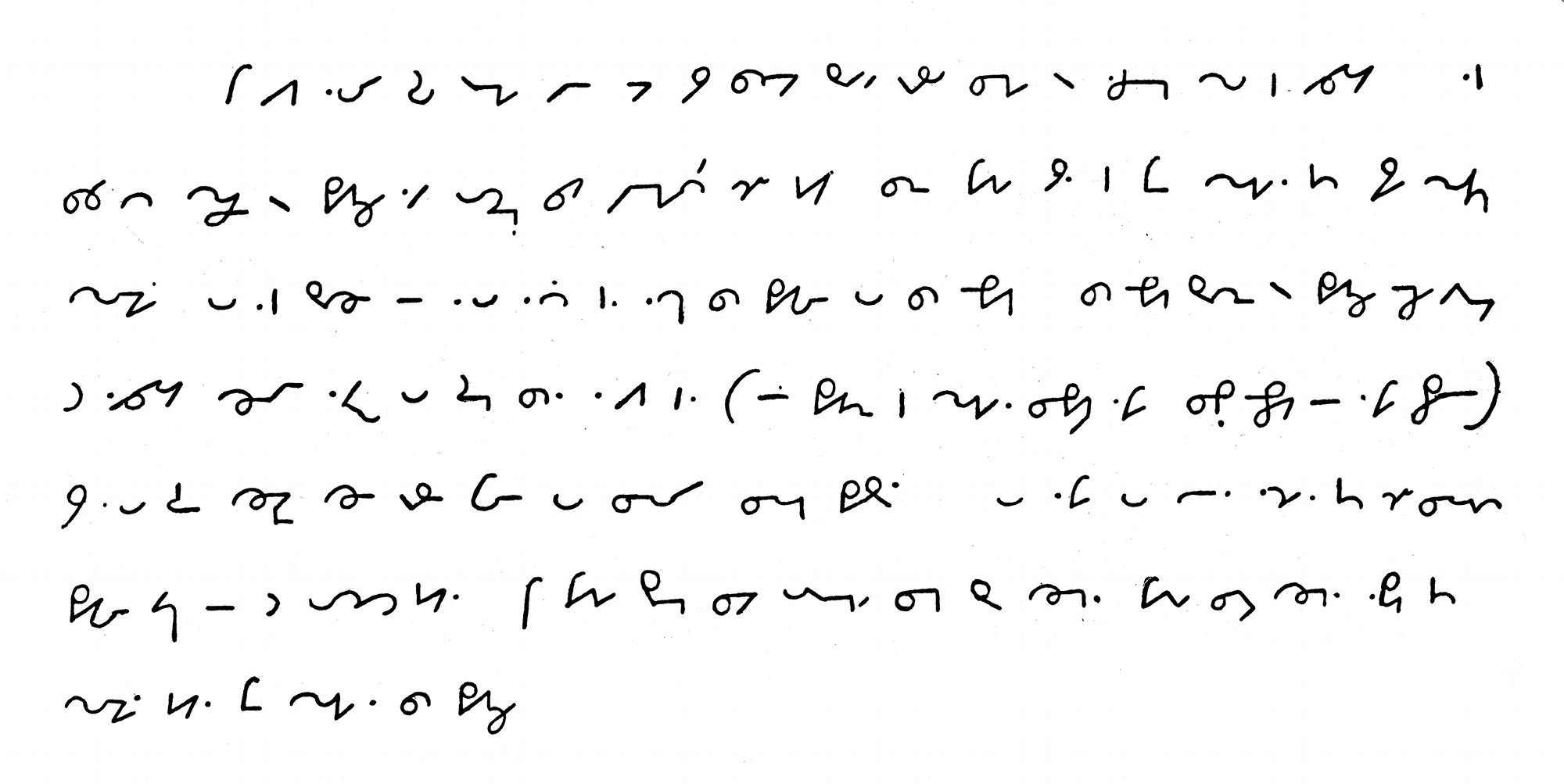
Plate XI from Samuel Taylor's shorthand book, 1786. The first line reads, th rt Vnr jn fstr rs sd h wshd br-ing fr-ward mtr v Vtmst kn t rlnd Vt (The Right Honourable John Foster rose, and said, he wished to bring forward a matter of the utmost consequence to Ireland; it ...)

The system of geometric shorthand published in Britain by Samuel Taylor in 1786, under the title An essay intended to establish a standard for an universal system of Stenography, or Short-hand writing, was the first shorthand system to be used across the English-speaking world. Taylor shorthand uses an alphabet of 19 letters of simplified shape. His book was translated and published in France by Théodore-Pierre Bertin in 1792 under the title Système universel et complet de Stenographie ou Manière abrégée d'écrire applicable à tous les idiomes.

== Principles ==
Vowels are omitted except at the beginning and end of a word, where all vowels and diphthongs are written as a single dot. A single letter stands for both f and v, one for s and z, and another for g (either pronunciation) and j, as well as additional letters for ch, sh, th. The consonants are joined, as in cursive Latin script, apart from a couple of suffixes; when two of the same consonant come together (due to the omission of an intervening vowel), they are written with a single letter of larger size. (An exception: when two "r"s are written, without an adjoining consonant, as in 'rare', then the second is written as an italic Latin r.)

Taylor shorthand is written partially phonetically, so that, for example, an English word containing ph is written with the letter for f, and c is written as k or s. However, silent e is written with a dot, so that rear is ⟨rr⟩, but rare is ⟨rr·⟩. H tends to be omitted medially and even initially, a vowel dot written instead, presumably reflecting Taylor's pronunciation.

In addition to sounds, each letter stands for several common short words. There is a special letter for suffixes pronounced like -ious and the abbreviation viz. (used for namely or as follows).

The shapes of the letters are as follows. Because they are not supported by computer fonts, Canadian syllabics have been substituted where these have approximately the same shape (though they tend to have deeper curves and shorter lines than the shorthand letters); where a symbol is not available, a description is given. L and r are written upwards; all other vertical and diagonal letters are written downwards.

Sound	Shape of letter	Abbreviation for
vowel	· (when initial or final)	
b	\ with a loop at top, in the direction of a ϱ, like a ᑭ tipped back The loop switches to the left side after a vertical letter (d, g, h, k, p, t)	be, been, by
d	/ (written downwards)	do, did
f, v	\	of, off, if
g, j	ᑐ	go, give, God, judge
h	/ with a loop at top, in the direction of a ρ, like a ᑭ tipped forward	have, he
k	ᑎ	know(n), no
l	/ with a loop at bottom, in the direction of a 6, like a ᑲ tipped forward Written upwards; the loop switches to the left side after an n	all, lord(ship)
m	ᓂ The loop switches to the top, ᓇ, after an upward or straight horizontal stroke (l, n, r, s, x, y)	me, my, many
n	ᑌ	in, on, an, and, many
p	ᑭ The loop faces the other way, ᑫ, after a stroke to the lower left (d, g, h)	piece, peace, person
r	r when not joining another consonant; otherwise as d but upwards*	or, are, our, her, air
s, z	—	is, as, has, his, us
t	|	that, time
w	ᕠ It flips upside-down, ᕞ, after an upward or straight horizontal stroke (l, m, n, r, s, x, y)	with, which, who
x	ᓚ	example, except
y	/ with a hook at bottom left, like a ᓚ tipped upwards	you(r), year
ch	ᑕ	such, chance, church
sh	ᓕ	shall, she
th	ᒋ	the, they
-ious	ᓗ	conscious, judicious
&c.	o	so forth, the world
viz.	ᒥ	namely, as follows

*When the only consonant in a word is r, it is written as an italic Latin r, and so the second r in a sequence rr, but when joined to a consonant (even at the end of a word) it is written like d, distinguished by the direction of the stroke. (The direction becomes obvious when letters are joined.)

Various suffixes are plural -s (a dash over the last letter), -ly (a dot below the last letter, so ⟨:⟩ 'holy'), -ing (a ᐟ after the word, or below the last letter for -ings, so ⟨(⟩- turned 90° 'kings'), -tion (a dot above the last letter, so ⟨·(⟩ turned 90° 'notion'), -tions (a ᐟ above the last letter), -ble (as b), -ment (as m), -ject (as j), -ward (as w), -ship (as sh).
