= Anigouran =

Character in Tuareg mythology

Anigouran or Aligouran, or Arigullan, is a character in the mythology of the Tuaregs. The character appears in many stories transmitted by their oral tradition. Anigouran is characterized by his exceptional intelligence and his taste for riddles. He is credited with the invention of Tifinagh, the traditional script of the Tuareg languages, and entries using this alphabet engraved on the rocks of the Aïr Mountains; it also made him the mythical inventor of several games.

== In the Tuareg mythology ==
The stories devoted to Anigouran depict adventures in which his intelligence and cunning allow him to get out of difficult situations. They also portray his rivalry with his Adelasegh nephew, whose great intelligence causes jealousy of Anigouran, who tries to kill him several times, but eventually reconciled with him. At a time when Adelasegh and his sister were captured by bandits and where Anigouran finally decided to reconcile with his nephew, Anigouran can not trace them, So he engraved on the desert rocks a coded Tifinagh message that only Adelasegh and his sister can decode, to show them the way back to his camp. This story thus provides a mythological explanation of the current presence of Tifinagh inscriptions in the desert.
