= Simson Shorthand =

Shorthand system invented by James Simson

- Script type: heavy-line script abugida shorthand
- Creator: James Simson
- Published: 1881/1883

Simson Shorthand is a system of shorthand invented by James Simson, originally published in his 1881 book, Compend of Syllabic Shorthand: Being a Synopsis of the System, and in more detail in his books, Syllabic Shorthand (1883). At least three versions of the latter were published; the third edition being published in 1885 under the title Manual of Syllabic Shorthand.

The 1885 book describes the system on its title page as "A system of brief writing by syllabic characters, based on the common alphabet, and written according to the sounds of spoken language." The syllabic nature would make for a resemblance to Boyd's Syllabic Shorthand, though unlike Boyd's system, the consonants are always written in the same direction, with modifications being made by bold lining, half-size writing, and other such alterations. Describing it as "based on the common alphabet" would imply a resemblance to ABC systems such as Speedwriting, but in fact the symbols appear to be more in the nature of symbolic systems such as Gregg.
