= Anton Bezenšek =

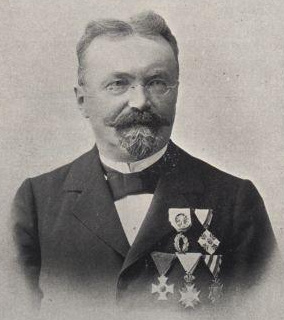
- Born: 15 April 1854; Bezenškovo Bukovje; Vojnik, Austrian Empire
- Died: 11 December 1915 (aged 61); Sofia, Bulgaria
- Occupation: Linguist

Anton Bezenšek (15 April 1854 – 11 December 1915) was a Slovene linguist, journalist, shorthand expert, and lecturer, who spent most of his life in Bulgaria. He is known as the scholar who adapted the Gabelsberger shorthand system to the South Slavic languages.

Bezenšek was born in a small village of Bezenškovo Bukovje near Frankolovo, Slovenia, in what was then the Austrian Duchy of Styria. He attended the Celje First Grammar School at the age of 12 and graduated with honours. In 1873 he was elected for a chairman of a school student organization, and learnt the Croatian adaptation of Gabelsberger Shorthand. Later, he entered the University of Zagreb, where he studied Greek, Latin, and Bulgarian in the philosophy faculty. As a student, he delivered a shorthand course, which was attended by 236 people in 5 years. After graduating, Bezenšek visited Prague, Dresden and Ljubljana, obtained a teaching permission, and worked in Zagreb as a chief stenographer in Parliament. In his 1890 biographic notes, he expressed ideas about a common South Slavic shorthand system: "It would be of benefit to the spread of shorthand among South Slavs to establish a South-Slavic Shorthand Union, like the German or Northern Shorthand Union, ... it should have an agency of its own and should hold an annual congress once in Zagreb, once in Belgrade, once in Sofia, once in Ljubljana."

Responding to an invitation from the Bulgarian government, and after being recommended by his colleague Spas Vatsov, Bezenšek moved to the recently formed Principality in 1879, and worked as a chief stenographer at the National Assembly in Sofia. He agreed on a salary, which was lower than what he could have earned for a professorship. On 25 September 1879 he conducted the first shorthand course in Bulgaria.

In 1884 one of the chief stenographer's students reported against him, and Bezenšek was fired from his job at the National Assembly, but instead of accepting proposals for a return to Slovenia and Croatia, he decided to move to Plovdiv, which was then the capital of Eastern Rumelia. From 1885 until 1905, he worked in high schools there, introducing Ethics into the curriculum, as well as applying modern methodologies for studying foreign languages—e.g. his New Practical Manual for Easily Learning the German Language (Bulgarian: Ново практическо ръководство за лесно изучаване на немския език).

Bezenšek moved to Sofia again in 1906, and stayed there till his death. He remained an active scholar, issued a lot of publications and translations, and had been a lecturer at the Sofia University from 1911. Bezenšek played a significant role for fostering the dialogue between Bulgarians and Slovenians, publishing a number of works in Slovenian on Bulgarian matters and vice versa.

== See also ==
- Bezenšek Shorthand
