= Charles K. Bliss =

Austrian-Australian chemical engineer and semiotician (1897–1985)

- Born: Karl Kassel Blitz; September 5, 1897; Czernovitz, Bukovina, Austria-Hungary (now Chernivsti, Ukraine)
- Died: July 13, 1985 (aged 87); Sydney, Australia
- Citizenship: Austrian (until 1938); Stateless (1939–1946); Australian (from 1946)
- Education: Vienna University of Technology
- Occupations: chemical engineer, semiotician
- Known for: Inventor of Blissymbolics
- Spouse: Claire (died 1961)
- Parents: Michel Anchel (father); Jeanette Blitz (mother)

Charles Kasiel Bliss (German: Karl Kassel Blitz; September 5, 1897 – July 13, 1985) was an Austrian-Australian chemical engineer and semiotician, best known as the inventor of Blissymbols, an ideographic writing system. He was born in Chernivtsi, Bukovina, Austria-Hungary (now Chernivsti, Ukraine) but was forced to flee to Australia during the Second World War as a Jewish refugee fleeing the Nazis.

== Early life ==
Bliss was born Karl Kasiel Blitz on September 5, 1897 to a Jewish family in Czernowitz (Chernivsti), Duchy of Bukovina, then part of the Austro-Hungarian Empire, now in Ukraine. His mother, Jeanette Blitz and father, Michel Anchel were German-speaking Jews who grew up in Czernowitz. He was the eldest of four children. The area of his birth and early life was influenced by the Habsburg monarchy, as Czernowitz was home to a diverse population including Germans, Romanians, Ukrainians, Poles, Jews, and Romani. Bliss would reflect in later years saying, “Where I lived we spoke about six different languages. There was no need for a little boy like me to realize how stupid it was to speak six different languages.”

Blitz's early life was filled with poverty, cold and starvation. His father supported the family by working as a mechanic, optician, and wood turner. He was also a frequent target of antisemitism at school due to him being Jewish. When Blitz was eight years old, Russia lost the Russo-Japanese War and pogroms against the Jews intensified, and refugees from the town of Kishinev came into Czernowitz seeking sanctuary. At the same time, Blitz saw a slide show of the Austro-Hungarian North Pole Expedition which inspired him to study engineering to improve technology for ordinary people.

Blitz said that the symbols on his father's circuit diagrams made instant sense to him. They were a "logical language" and was impressed by chemical symbols, which he thought could be read by anyone, regardless of their mother tongue.

During World War I, Blitz volunteered first as a helper with the Red Cross field ambulance, then as a soldier in the Austro-Hungarian Army. The family was forced to flee to Vienna after the Imperial Russian Army occupied Czernowitz in 1916. After the war he engaged in studies and graduated from the Vienna University of Technology as a chemical engineer in 1922. He joined Telefunken, a German radio apparatus company, where he successfully worked all the way to be promoted as chief of the patent department.

== Detention and Second World War ==
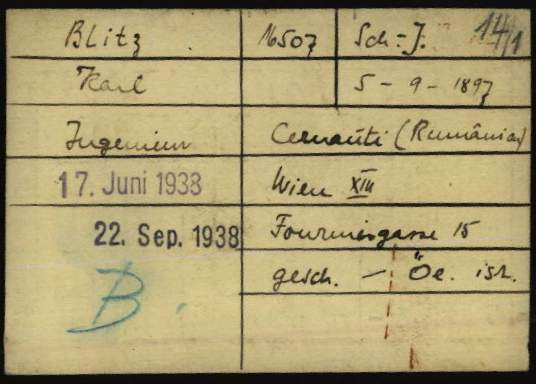
Registry card of Charles K. Bliss as a prisoner at Dachau Nazi Concentration Camp

In March 1938, the Third Reich annexed Austria via the Anschluss, and Bliss, as a Jew, was sent to Dachau concentration camp. Later. he was moved to Buchenwald concentration camp. His wife, Claire, a German Catholic, made constant efforts to have him released. He was released in 1939 but was required to leave the country for England immediately. In England, Bliss tried to bring his wife to him, but the outbreak of World War II in September 1939 made that impossible. It was there that, because the Nazi bombing of England was called the "blitz," he changed his surname to Bliss.

Bliss arranged for Claire to escape Germany via his family in Cernăuți, Romania (now called Chernivtsi in present day Ukraine). Needing to leave there, Claire moved on to Greece and safety, until October 1940 when Italy invaded Greece. The couple were reunited on Christmas Eve 1940, after Claire continued east to Shanghai and Charles went west to Shanghai via Canada and Japan.

After the Japanese occupied Shanghai, Bliss and his wife were placed into the Hongkew ghetto. Claire, as a German and a Christian had the option of claiming her German citizenship, applying for a divorce and being released. She did not do so and instead accompanied Bliss into the ghetto.

== Development of symbolic writing system ==
Basic Blissymbols

In Shanghai, Bliss became interested in Chinese characters, which he mistakenly thought were ideograms. He studied them and learned how to read shop signs and Chinese newspapers. With some astonishment, he one day realised that he had been reading the symbols off not in Chinese, but in his own language, German. With ideograms for his inspiration, Bliss set out to develop a system of writing by pictures. At that time Bliss had not become aware of Gottfried Wilhelm Leibniz's "Universal Symbolism".

Bliss and his wife migrated to Australia after the war, reaching Australia in July 1946. His semiotic ideas met with universal rejection. Bliss, without any Australian or Commonwealth qualifications, had to work as a labourer to support his family. He worked on his system of symbols at night. Bliss and his wife became Australian citizens.

Originally Bliss had called his system "World Writing" because the aim was to establish a series of symbols that would be understood by all, regardless of language. Bliss then decided an English-language name was too restricted and called the system Semantography. In Sydney in 1949 Bliss published the three-volume International Semantography: A non-alphabetical Symbol Writing readable in all languages. There was no great positive reaction. For the next four years Claire Bliss sent 6,000 letters to educators and universities, to no better effect.

In 1965 Bliss published a second edition of his work, Semantography (Blissymbolics).

It was about this time that the increase in international tourism convinced many that only a pictorial symbol language could be understood by all. Bliss made sure his idea was attached to his name, hence Blissymbolics.

=== Educational use ===
In 1971, Bliss learned that, during that year, the Ontario Crippled Children's Centre in Toronto, Canada (now Holland Bloorview Kids Rehabilitation Hospital) had been using his symbols to teach children with cerebral palsy to communicate. He was thrilled at first and traveled to Canada, but he became horrified when he learned that the centre had extended his set of symbols and was using the symbols as a bridge to help the children learn to use spoken and written words in a traditional language, which were far from his vision for Blissymbolics. He badgered and eventually sued the centre, at one time even threatening a nurse with imprisonment. After ten years of constant attacks from Bliss, the centre came to a compromise with Bliss because it felt the publicity he drew to be bringing a bad name to the centre. The world copyright for use of his symbols with handicapped children was licensed to the Blissymbolics Communication Foundation in Canada.

== Recognition ==
Bliss was the subject of the 1974 film Mr Symbol Man, a co-production of Film Australia and the National Film Board of Canada.

Bliss was made a Member of the Order of Australia (A.M.) in 1976 for "services to the community, particularly to handicapped children".

On the basis of the recognition of the innovative nature of his work, Bliss was appointed an Honorary Fellow in Linguistics at the Australian National University, by the (then) Head of the ANU School of Linguistics, Professor Bob Dixon, in 1979.

== Publications ==
=== Bliss ===
- Bliss, C.K., International Semantography: A Non-Alphabetical Symbol Writing Readable in All Languages. A Practical Tool for General International Communication, Especially in Science, Industry, Commerce, Traffic, etc. and for Semantical Education, Based on the Principles of Ideographic Writing and Chemical Symbolism, Institute of Semantography, (Sydney), 1949.
- Bliss, C.K., Semantography-Blissymbolics: A Simple System of 100 Logical Pictorial Symbols, Which can be Operated and Read Like 1+2=3 in All Languages... (Third, Enlarged Edition), Semantography-Blissymbolics Pubs, (Sydney), 1978.
- Bliss, C.K., Semantography and the Ultimate Meanings of Mankind: Report and Reflections on a Meeting of the Author with Julian Huxley. A selection of the Semantography Series; with "What scientists think of C.K. Bliss' semantography", Institute for Semantography, (Sydney), 1955.
- Bliss, C.K., The Blissymbols Picture Book (Three Volumes), Development and Advisory Publications of N.S.W. for Semantography-Blissymbols, (Coogee), 1985.
- Bliss, C.K., The Story of the Struggle for Semantography: The Semantography Series, Nos.1–163, Institute for Semantography, (Coogee), 1942–1956.
- Bliss, C.K. & McNaughton, S., Mr Symbol Man: The Book to the Film Produced by the National Film Board of Canada and Film Australia (Second Edition), Semantography (Blissymbolics) Publications, (Sydney), 1976.
- Bliss, C.K. (& Frederick, M.A. illus.), The Invention and Discovery That Will Change Our Lives, Semantography-Blissymbolics Publications, (Sydney), 1970.

=== Others ===
- Breckon, Colin Joseph, "Symbolism as a Written Language", pp.74–83 in Breckon, C.J., Graphic Symbolism, McGraw-Hill, Sydney), 1975.
- Reiser, O.L., Unified symbolism for world understanding in science: including Bliss symbols (Semantography) and logic, cybernetics and semantics: A paper read in parts at the Annual Meeting of the AmericanAssociation for the Advancement of Science, Philadelphia, 1951, and at the Conference of the International Society of Significa, Amsterdam, 1953, Semantography Publishing Co., (Coogee), 1955.
