= Blissymbols =

Ideographic writing system

- Script type: Ideographic
- Period: 1949 to the present
- Direction: Varies
- Languages: Blissymbols

ISO 15924
- ISO 15924: Blis (550), Blissymbols

Blissymbols
- ("world language")
- Created by: Charles K. Bliss
- Date: 1949
- Setting and usage: Augmentative and alternative communication
- Purpose: Constructed language: International auxiliary language; Pasigraphy; Blissymbols
- Sources: Ideographic written language

Official status
- Regulated by: Blissymbolics Communication International

Language codes
- ISO 639-2: zbl
- ISO 639-3: zbl
- Glottolog: blis1239
- IETF: zbl-bciav (subset defined in the BCI Authorized Vocabulary), zbl-bcizbl (version curated by the BCI).

Blissymbols or Blissymbolics is a constructed language conceived as an ideographic writing system called Semantography consisting of several hundred basic symbols, each representing a concept, which can be composed together to generate new symbols that represent new concepts.

Blissymbols differ from most of the world's major writing systems in that the characters do not correspond at all to the sounds of any spoken language.

Semantography was published by Charles K. Bliss in 1949 and found use in the education of people with communication difficulties.

== History ==
Semantography was invented by Charles K. Bliss (1897–1985), born Karl Kasiel Blitz to a Jewish family in Chernivtsi (then Czernowitz, Austria-Hungary), which had a mixture of different nationalities that "hated each other, mainly because they spoke and thought in different languages."

Bliss graduated as a chemical engineer at the Vienna University of Technology, and joined an electronics company. After the Nazi annexation of Austria in 1938, Bliss was sent to concentration camps but his German wife Claire managed to get him released, and they finally became exiles in Shanghai, where Bliss had a cousin.

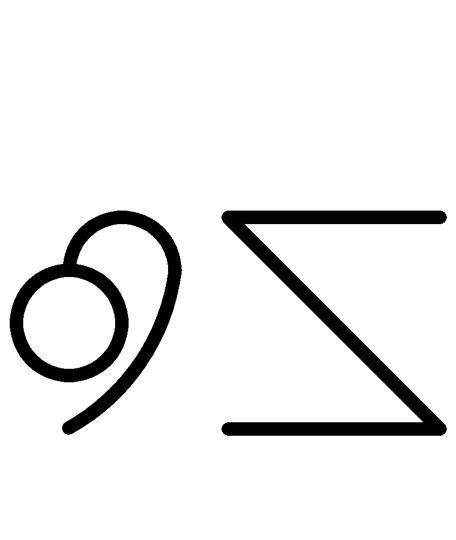
Rendering of the concept of "Blissymbols language". The left character represents "language" ("mouth" + "ear") and the right represents "Blissymbols" ("sky" + "pen" + "earth")

Bliss devised the symbols while a refugee at the Shanghai Ghetto and Sydney, from 1942 to 1949. He wanted to create an easy-to-learn international auxiliary language to allow communication between different linguistic communities. He was inspired by Chinese characters, with which he became familiar at Shanghai.

Bliss published his system in Semantography (1949, exp. 2nd ed. 1965, 3rd ed. 1978.) It had several names:

In 1942 I named my symbols World Writing, then chose in 1947 an international scientific term Semantography (from Greek semanticos significant meaning, and graphein to write) … My friends argued that is customary to name new writing systems after the inventors … Blissymbolics, or Blissymbols, or simply Bliss (1965, p. 8)

As the "tourist explosion" took place in the 1960s, a number of researchers were looking for new standard symbols to be used at roads, stations, airports, etc. Bliss then adopted the name Blissymbolics in order that no researcher could plagiarize his system of symbols.

Since the 1960s/1970s, Blissymbols have become popular as a method to teach disabled people to communicate. In 1971, Shirley McNaughton started a pioneer program at the Ontario Crippled Children's Centre (OCCC), aimed at children with cerebral palsy, from the approach of augmentative and alternative communication (AAC). According to Arika Okrent, Bliss used to complain about the way the teachers at the OCCC were using the symbols, in relation to the proportions of the symbols and other questions: for example, they used "fancy" terms like "nouns" and "verbs", to describe what Bliss called "things" and "actions". (2009, p. 173-4). The ultimate objective of the OCCC program was to use Blissymbols as a practical way to teach the children to express themselves in their mother tongue, since the Blissymbols provided visual keys to understand the meaning of the English words, especially the abstract words.

In Semantography, Bliss had not provided a systematic set of definitions for his symbols (there was a provisional vocabulary index instead (1965, pp. 827–67)), so McNaughton's team might often interpret a certain symbol in a way that Bliss would later criticize as a "misinterpretation". For example, they might interpret a tomato as a vegetable —according to the English definition of tomato— even though the ideal Blissymbol of vegetable was restricted by Bliss to just vegetables growing underground. Eventually the OCCC staff modified and adapted Bliss's system in order to make it serve as a bridge to English. (2009, p. 189) Bliss' complaints about his symbols "being abused" by the OCCC became so intense that the director of the OCCC told Bliss, on his 1974 visit, never to come back. In spite of this, in 1975, Bliss granted an exclusive world license, for use with disabled children, to the new Blissymbolics Communication Foundation directed by Shirley McNaughton (later called Blissymbolics Communication International, BCI). Nevertheless, in 1977, Bliss claimed that this agreement was violated so that he was deprived of effective control of his symbol system.

According to Okrent (2009, p. 190), there was a final period of conflict, as Bliss would make continuous criticisms of McNaughton often followed by apologies. Bliss finally brought his lawyers back to the OCCC, reaching a settlement:

In 1982, the OCCC got an exclusive, noncancelable, and perpetual license to use Blissymbolics, and he [Bliss] got $160,000. Easter Seals, the charitable foundation .... paid the settlement. .... Bliss spent the money on a big publication run of his own Blissymbols teaching manual. (2009, pp. 192–4)

Blissymbolic Communication International now claims an exclusive license from Bliss, for the use and publication of Blissymbols for persons with communication, language, and learning difficulties.

The Blissymbol method has been used in Canada, Sweden, and a few other countries. Practitioners of Blissymbolics (that is, speech and language therapists and users) maintain that some users who have learned to communicate with Blissymbolics find it easier to learn to read and write traditional orthography in the local spoken language than do users who did not know Blissymbolics.

== The speech question ==
Unlike similar constructed languages like aUI, Blissymbolics was conceived as a written language with no phonology, on the premise that "interlinguistic communication is mainly carried on by reading and writing". Nevertheless, Bliss suggested that a set of international words could be adopted, so that "a kind of spoken language could be established – as a travelling aid only". (1965, p. 89–90).

Whether Blissymbolics constitutes an unspoken language is a controversial question, whatever its practical utility may be. Some linguists, such as John DeFrancis and J. Marshall Unger have argued that genuine ideographic writing systems with the same capacities as natural languages do not exist.

== Grammar ==
The grammar of Blissymbols is based on a certain interpretation of nature, dividing it into matter (material things), energy (actions), and human values (mental evaluations). In a natural language, these would give place respectively to nouns, verbs, and adjectives. In Blissymbols, they are marked respectively by a small square symbol, a small cone symbol, and a small V or inverted cone. These symbols may be placed above any other symbol, turning it respectively into a "thing", an "action", and an "evaluation":

The main manifestations of our world can be classified into matter, energy, and...mind force. Matter is symbolised by a square to indicate that the structure of matter is not chaotic...The symbol for energy indicates...the primeval [first age] action of our planet, the throwing-up of volcano cones...The symbol for human evaluation...suggests a cone standing on its point, a position which in physics is termed labile [likely to fall, unstable]....All words relating to things and actions refer to something real, which exists outside of our brain. But human evaluations...depend upon the mind of each individual. (1965, p. 42-43)

When a symbol is not marked by any of the three grammar symbols (square, cone, inverted cone), it may refer to a non-material thing, a grammatical particle, etc.

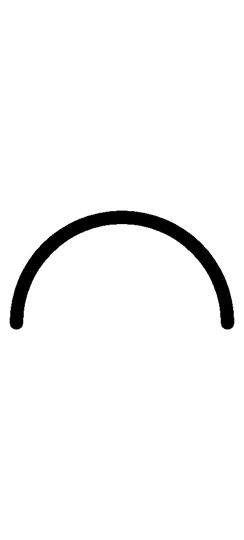
mind

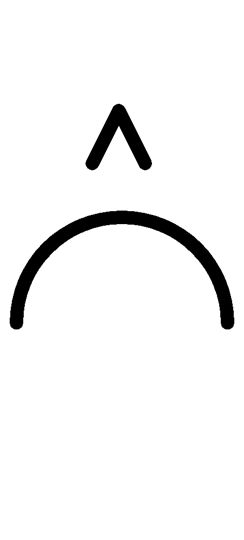
think

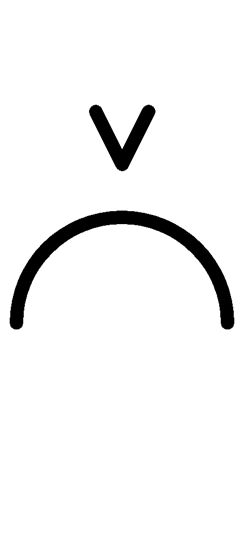
thoughtful

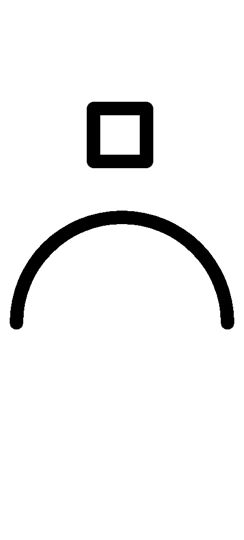
brain

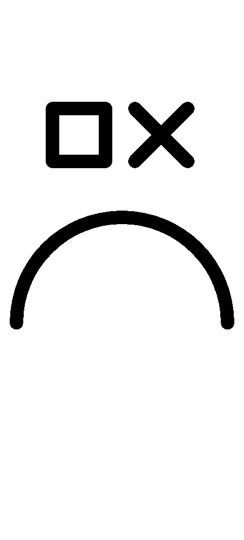
brains

== Examples ==
The symbol represents the expression "world language", which was a first tentative name for Blissymbols. It combines the symbol for "writing tool" or "pen" (a line inclined, as a pen being used) with the symbol for "world", which in its turn combines "ground" or "earth" (a horizontal line below) and its counterpart derivative "sky" (a horizontal line above).

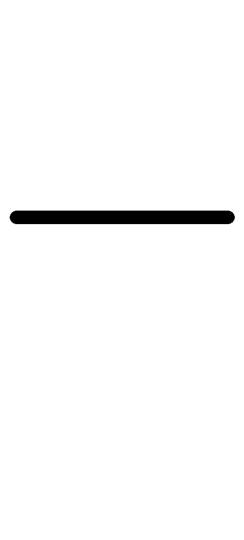
sky

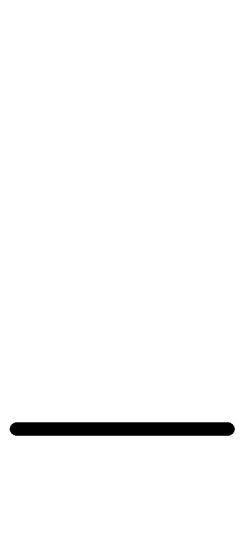
ground

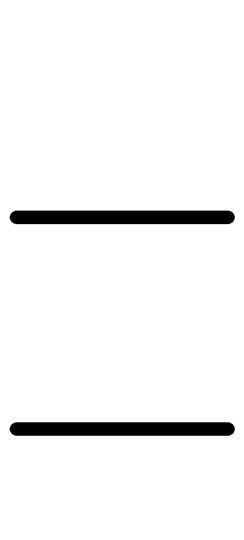
world

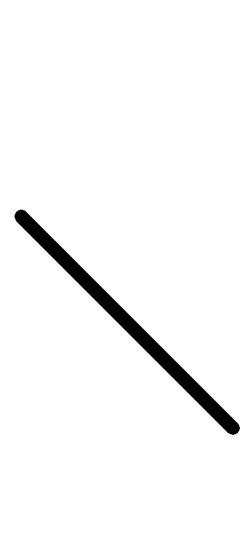
pen

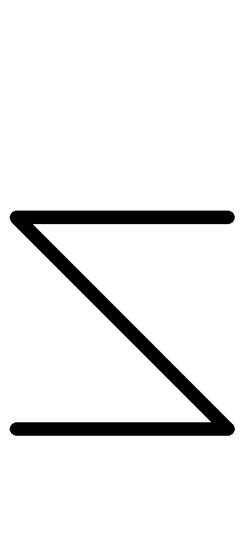
Blissymbols

Thus the world would be seen as "what is among the ground and the sky", and "Blissymbols" would be seen as "the writing tool to express the world". This is clearly distinct from the symbol of "language", which is a combination of "mouth" and "ear". Thus natural languages are mainly oral, while Blissymbols is just a writing system dealing with semantics, not phonetics.

=== Country names ===
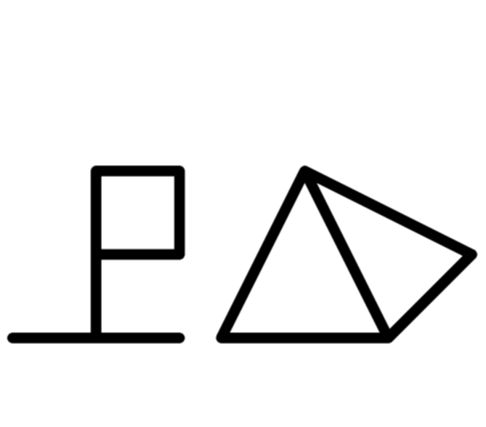
Egypt

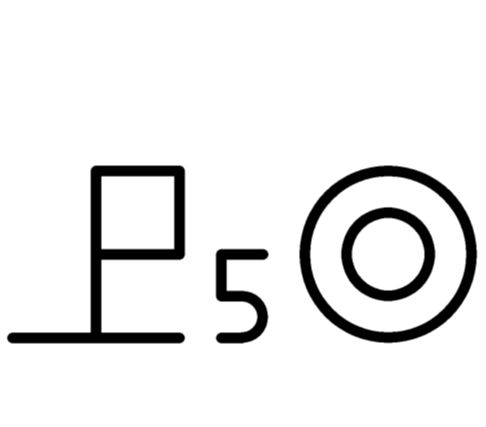
Greece

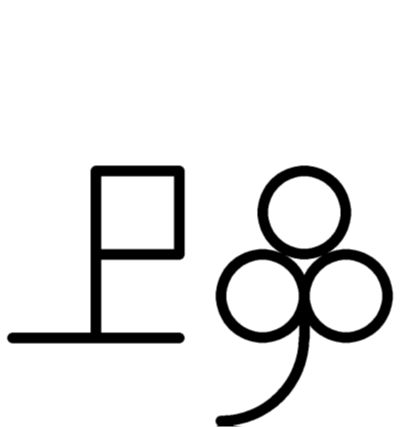
Ireland

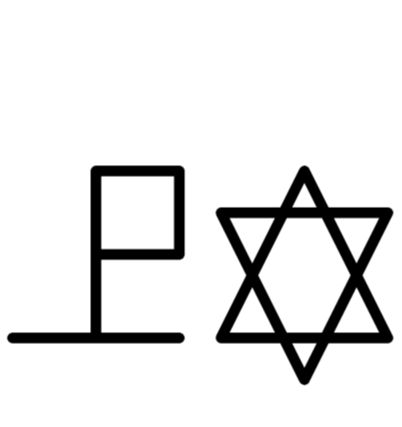
Israel

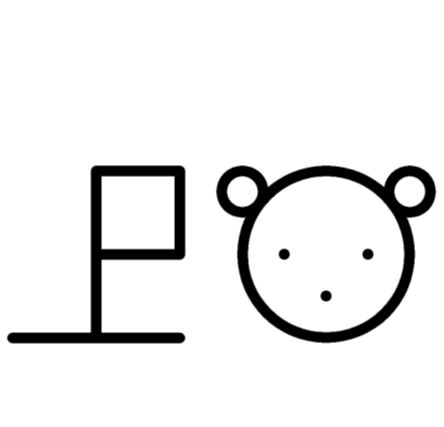
Russia

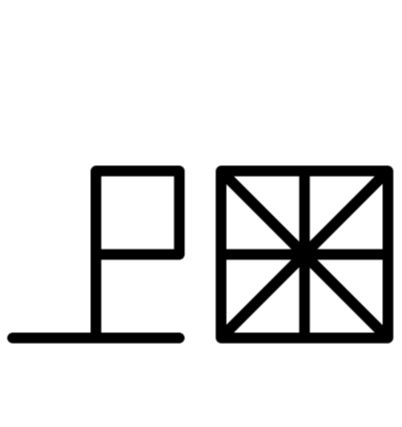
United Kingdom

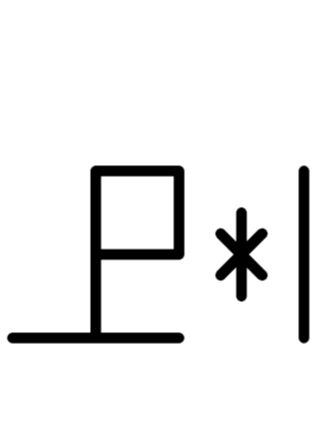
USA

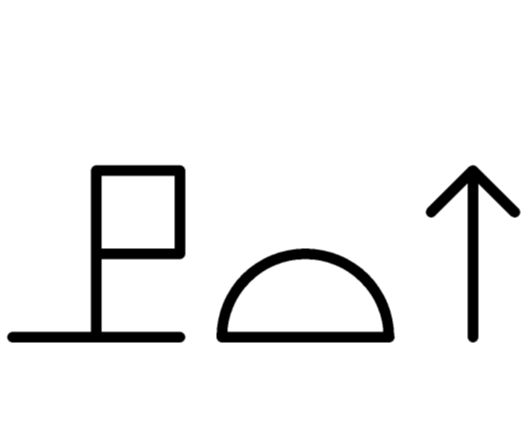
Japan

=== Abstract concepts ===
The 900 individual symbols of the system are called "Bliss-characters"; these may be "ideographic" – representing abstract concepts, "pictographic" – a direct representation of objects, or "composite" – in which two or more existing Bliss-characters are superimposed to represent a new meaning. Size, orientation and relation to the "skyline" and "earthline" affects the meaning of each symbol. A single concept is called a "Bliss-word", which can consist of one or more Bliss-characters.

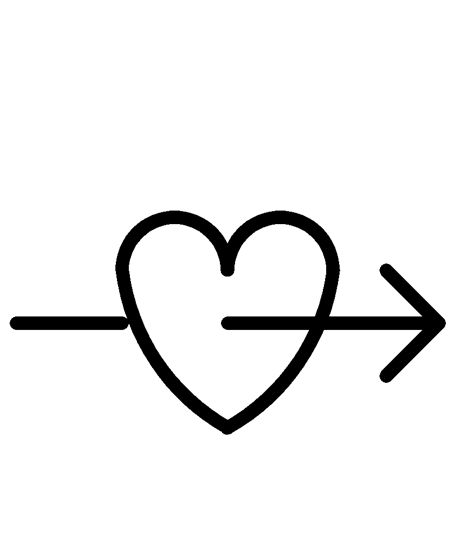
love

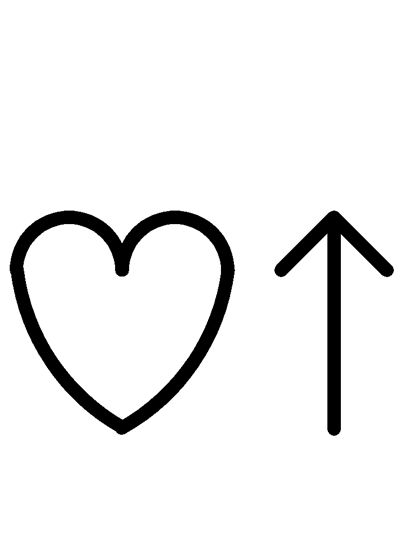
happiness

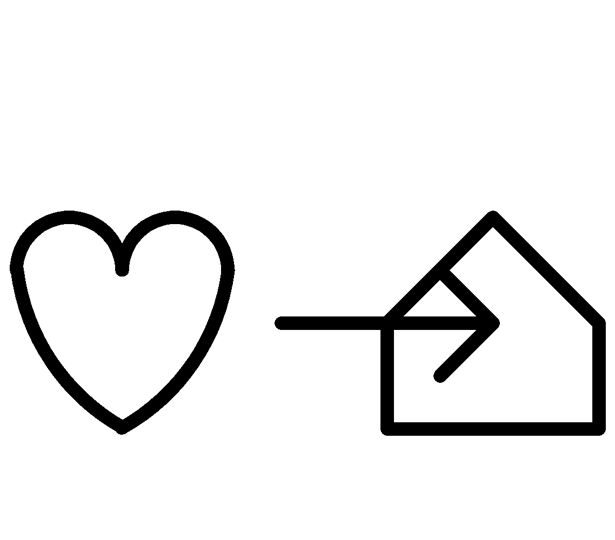
welcome
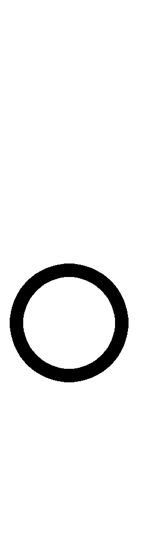
mouth

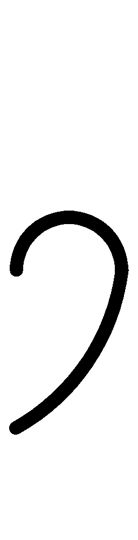
ear

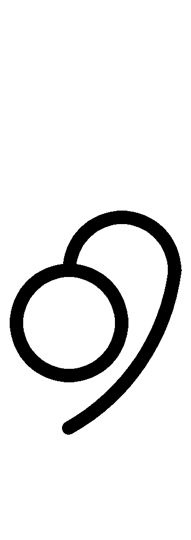
language

In multiple-character Bliss-words, the main character is called the "classifier" which "indicates the semantic or grammatical category to which the Bliss-word belongs". To this can be added Bliss-characters as prefixes or suffixes called "modifiers" which amend the meaning of the first symbol. A further symbol called an "indicator" can be added above one of the characters in the Bliss-word (typically the classifier); these are used as "grammatical and/or semantic markers."

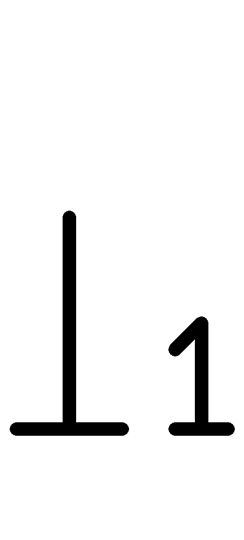
I

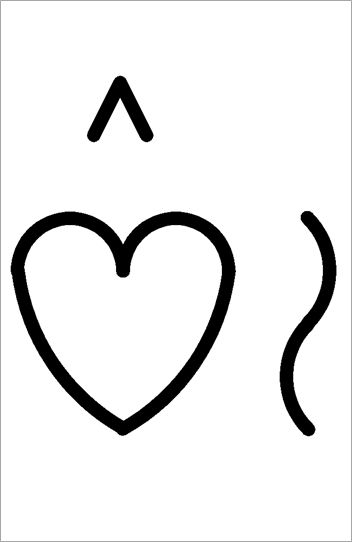
want

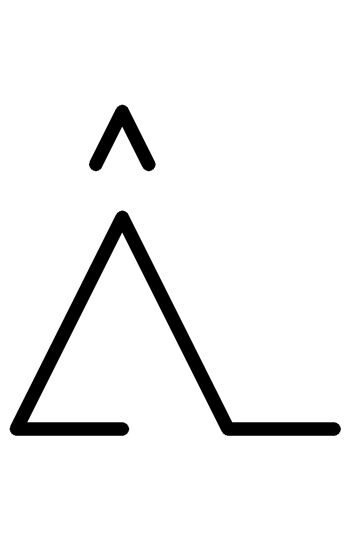
go

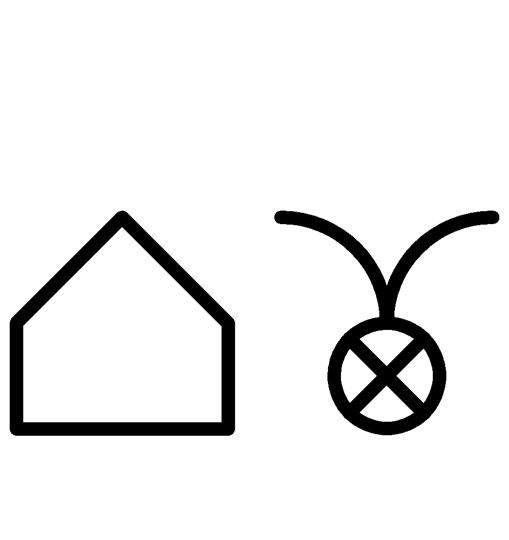
airport

The sentence "I want to go to the airport." shows several features of Blissymbolics:

symbol	explanation
	The pronoun "I" is formed of the Bliss-character for "person" and the number 1 (the first person). Using the number 2 would give the symbol for singular "You"; adding the plural indicator (a small cross at the top) would produce the pronouns "We" and plural "You".
	The Bliss-word for "to want" contains the heart which symbolizes "feeling" (the classifier), plus the serpentine line which symbolizes "fire" (the modifier), and the verb (called "action") indicator at the top.
	The Bliss-word for "to go" is composed of the Bliss-character for "leg" and the verb indicator.
	The Bliss-word for "airport" is composed of the Bliss-character for "house" (the classifier), and "plane" (the modifier); "plane" is a composite character composed of "wheel" and "wings".

== Towards the international standardization of the script ==
Blissymbolics was used in 1971 to help children at the Ontario Crippled Children's Centre (OCCC, now the Holland Bloorview Kids Rehabilitation Hospital) in Toronto, Ontario, Canada. Since it was important that the children see consistent pictures, OCCC had a draftsman named Jim Grice draw the symbols. Both Charles K. Bliss and Margrit Beesley at the OCCC worked with Grice to ensure consistency. In 1975, a new organization named Blissymbolics Communication Foundation directed by Shirley McNaughton led this effort. Over the years, this organization changed its name to Blissymbolics Communication Institute, Easter Seal Communication Institute, and ultimately to Blissymbolics Communication International (BCI).

BCI is an international group of people who act as an authority regarding the standardization of the Blissymbolics language. It has taken responsibility for any extensions of the Blissymbolics language as well as any maintenance needed for the language. BCI has coordinated usage of the language since 1971 for augmentative and alternative communication. BCI received a license and copyright through legal agreements with Charles K. Bliss in 1975 and 1982. Limiting the count of Bliss-characters (there are currently about 900) is very useful in order to help the user community. It also helps when implementing Blissymbolics using technology such as computers.

In 1991, BCI published a reference guide containing 2300 vocabulary items and detailed rules for the graphic design of additional characters, so they settled a first set of approved Bliss-words for general use. The Standards Council of Canada then sponsored, on January 21, 1993, the registration of an encoded character set for use in ISO/IEC 2022, in the ISO-IR international registry of coded character sets. After many years of requests, the Blissymbolic language was finally approved as an encoded language, with code zbl, into the ISO 639-2 and ISO 639-3 standards.

A proposal was posted by Michael Everson for the Blissymbolics script to be included in the Universal Character Set (UCS) and encoded for use with the ISO/IEC 10646 and Unicode standards. BCI would cooperate with the Unicode Technical Committee (UTC) and the ISO Working Group. The proposed encoding does not use the lexical encoding model used in the existing ISO-IR/169 registered character set, but instead applies the Unicode and ISO character-glyph model to the Bliss-character model already adopted by BCI, since this would significantly reduce the number of needed characters. Bliss-characters can now be used in a creative way to create many new arbitrary concepts, by surrounding the invented words with special Bliss indicators (similar to punctuation), something which was not possible in the ISO-IR/169 encoding.

However, by the end of 2009, the Blissymbolic script was not encoded in the UCS. Some questions are still unanswered, such as the inclusion in the BCI repertoire of some characters (currently about 24) that are already encoded in the UCS (like digits, punctuation signs, spaces and some markers), but whose unification may cause problems due to the very strict graphical layouts required by the published Bliss reference guides. In addition, the character metrics use a specific layout where the usual baseline is not used, and the ideographic em-square is not relevant for Bliss character designs that use additional "earth line" and "sky line" to define the composition square. Some fonts supporting the BCI repertoire are available and usable with texts encoded with private-use assignments (PUA) within the UCS. But only the private BCI encoding based on ISO-IR/169 registration is available for text interchange.

== See also ==
- Bété syllabary – Writing system
- Chinese characters – Logographic writing system
- Egyptian hieroglyphs – Ancient Egyptian writing system
- Esperanto – Constructed auxiliary language
- iConji – Pictographic writing system
- Isotype – Method of pictorial representation
- Kanji – Chinese characters used in Japanese writing
- Pictogram – Ideogram that conveys its meaning through its pictorial resemblance to a physical object
- sitelen pona – Constructed logography used for Toki Pona
- LoCoS (language) – Pictorial language
- Unifon – Latin-based phonemic orthography for American English
