= Théodore-Pierre Bertin =

Théodore-Pierre Bertin (2 November 1751 – 25 January 1819) was the author of fifty-odd works on various subjects, but is primarily remembered as the person responsible for adapting Samuel Taylor's shorthand to the French language and introducing modern shorthand to France.

Born at Provins (Seine-et-Marne) to Louis Bertin, a parliamentary lawyer, and Louise Mitantier, Bertin taught English before travelling to London to work as a translator. He studied Taylor shorthand during his time in Britain and, on returning to Paris in 1791, translated into French Taylor's book An essay intended to establish a standard for a universal system of Stenography, or Short-hand writing, publishing it in 1792 under the title Système universel et complet de Stenographie ou Manière abrégée d'écrire applicable à tous les idiomes (A complete and universal system of stenography or an abbreviated manner of writing applicable to all languages). In 1795, the French National Convention gave him an annual grant to continue this work. His book went into a second edition in 1795, a third in 1796 and a fourth in 1803. He continued to work for the government during the Directory, but the Consulate and First Empire did not employ his services. Under the Restauration, he established a stenographic service for the French Parliament and took a government post in the administration of business licenses (Régie des Droits Réunis). In 1817, he had become stenographer for the conservative journal Le Moniteur Universel. He died, aged 67, in Paris.

== Bertin's shorthand ==
Despite its roots, Bertin's system was not especially fast, but it did have the advantage of being highly readable. Each sound had a very distinctive symbol, largely carried over from Taylor's system, and added a few more symbols for final vowels. Also, like Taylor, Bertin eliminated all vowels that were neither at the beginning nor end of a word. This caused some ambiguity, but it did enable stenographers to write at the pace of speech. Composed of 16 basic letters, plus initials and finals, Bertin's scheme was the first that could be written without ever lifting the pen. It also employed abbreviations and initials to save time with common words. His method was ultimately substantially improved by Hippolyte Prévost and later by Albert Delaunay.
