= Stiefografie =

German shorthand system

- Script type: script abjadi Shorthand
- Creator: Helmut Stief
- Published: 1966
- Period: 1966–present
- Languages: German

Stiefografie, also called Stiefo or Rationelle Stenografie (Rational Shorthand), is a German shorthand system. It was invented by Helmut Stief (1906–1977), a German press and parliamentary stenographer, and first published in 1966.

Helmut Stief was dissatisfied with the Deutsche Einheitskurzschrift so he created a much simpler alternative system. According to Stief the eponymous shorthand system Stiefografie can be quickly learned within a very short time. There are only 25 characters to learn in the first level Grundschrift (business script).

== Writing ==
The system has only a minimum number of rules. Like most systems of shorthand, Stiefografie is a phonetic system. Sounds and words are written as they are spoken. Silent letters are ignored.

The consonant signs are made by simplifying the features of cursive Latin letters. Vowel signs are only used when a vowel stands at the end of a word. Vowels in the beginning or in the middle of words are represented symbolically by varying the position of the following consonant signs.

Stiefografie does not employ shading (variation of thickness of strokes) to distinguish vowel symbols. Shading is nowadays difficult to achieve with a ballpoint pen, a stylus or finger input for smart phones or tablet computers.

The punctuation marks full stop, semicolon and comma are not used because they look like some brief forms of very frequent German words in Aufbauschrift (speed script and speech script) and could be confused with these words. These punctuation marks are replaced by different space intervals between the sentences and phrases.

== Division of the system ==
Stiefografie shorthand is written in three levels: Grundschrift (business script), Aufbauschrift I (speed script I) and Aufbauschrift II (speech script II).

Grundschrift can be produced at a rate of 100 to 120 syllables per minute. There are only 24 characters for consonants and combinations of consonants (e.g. sch, sp, st). Contrary to the practice in many English shorthand systems (e.g. Pitman Shorthand), vowels are never omitted. There are no brief forms for the most frequent syllables and words of the German language in this first level.

Aufbauschrift I can be produced up to 160 syllables per minute. There are 54 brief forms for the most frequent words and syllables in the German language and rules for forming free abbreviations. These brief forms are distinguishable by size and position (three of them: above, below, or on the base line). Special endings and syllables can be omitted.

There are more than additional 120 brief forms in Aufbauschrift II to write up to about 400 syllables per minute. It is possible to omit special consonants, vowels and syllables.

== External links (German language pages) ==
- More information about Stiefografie
- Comparison of Stiefografie with Deutsche Einheitskurzschrift
- Another Website about Stiefografie
- More publications by Helmut Stief at Deutsche Nationalbibliothek
- "Kampf um Krakel". DER SPIEGEL. No. 45. October 31, 1966. p. 174.
- Stenografie für Linkshänder, in: Hamburger Abendblatt 300/1976 (24.12.1976), p. 22
- Article in an Eponym Dictionary by Rudolf Köster: Eigennamen im deutschen Wortschatz. Ein Lexikon, Berlin 2003
- Article in the German Orthography Dictionary DUDEN. Das große Fremdwörterbuch, Mannheim 2007, 4th edition
