= Munson Shorthand =

Shorthand writing system

- Script type: heavy-line geometric abjad shorthand
- Creator: James Eugene Munson

The Munson Shorthand system was a form of shorthand devised by James Eugene Munson, who was an official court stenographer in New York State. It is a slightly revised version of Pitman shorthand designed to make it more systematic.

Many of the symbols are identical to Pitman's. The idea of distinguishing voiced from unvoiced consonants by writing the former more darkly is taken directly from Pitman.
