= James Eugene Munson =

American court stenographer and inventor

James Eugene Munson (born in Paris, New York, 12 May 1835; died 1906) was an American court stenographer and inventor, noted mostly for his consolidation of his own work, and that of others, into the Munson Shorthand system.

== Biography ==
He studied for a time at Amherst College, but did not graduate. He became a student of shorthand early in his life, and he soon became an expert. Coming to New York City early in 1857, his first assignment was to make a verbatim report of the Harvey Burdell murder trial. Soon afterward, in connection with other court reporters, he set to work to simplify the existing systems of shorthand, and the fruits of their labor, as finally shaped and put into practice by Munson, were presented in his Complete Phonographer (New York, 1866), to the preparation of which he had devoted three years of labor, and tested it by seven years of practice.

The Complete Phonographer was followed in 1874 by a Dictionary of Practical Phonography, and in 1877 a revised edition of the Complete Phonographer appeared. In 1879 Munson published The Phrase Book of Practical Phonography. The “phrases” were taken almost entirely from illustrations gathered from Munson's notes made in his court practice, he having been court stenographer in New York City for more than twenty years. He also reported the Henry Ward Beecher trial for the New York Sun, without assistance, during the six months of its continuance. The report on the trial ran seven and a half columns of agate type per day.

Munson later went to work perfecting a typesetting machine that he had invented, which, being operated by means of a prepared ribbon of paper, automatically set a column of corrected, justified, and leaded type. He also invented the machines by which the ribbon is prepared, and a telegraph, also operated by the same paper ribbon, which causes an exact facsimile of the ribbon to be automatically produced at a distant point, ready for use in operating a similar typesetting machine. These inventions were based on his “Selecting Device,” which he also patented.
