= Garay alphabet =

Arabic-like alphabet for Wolof

Garay 𐵹𐵊𐵾𐵊𐵼
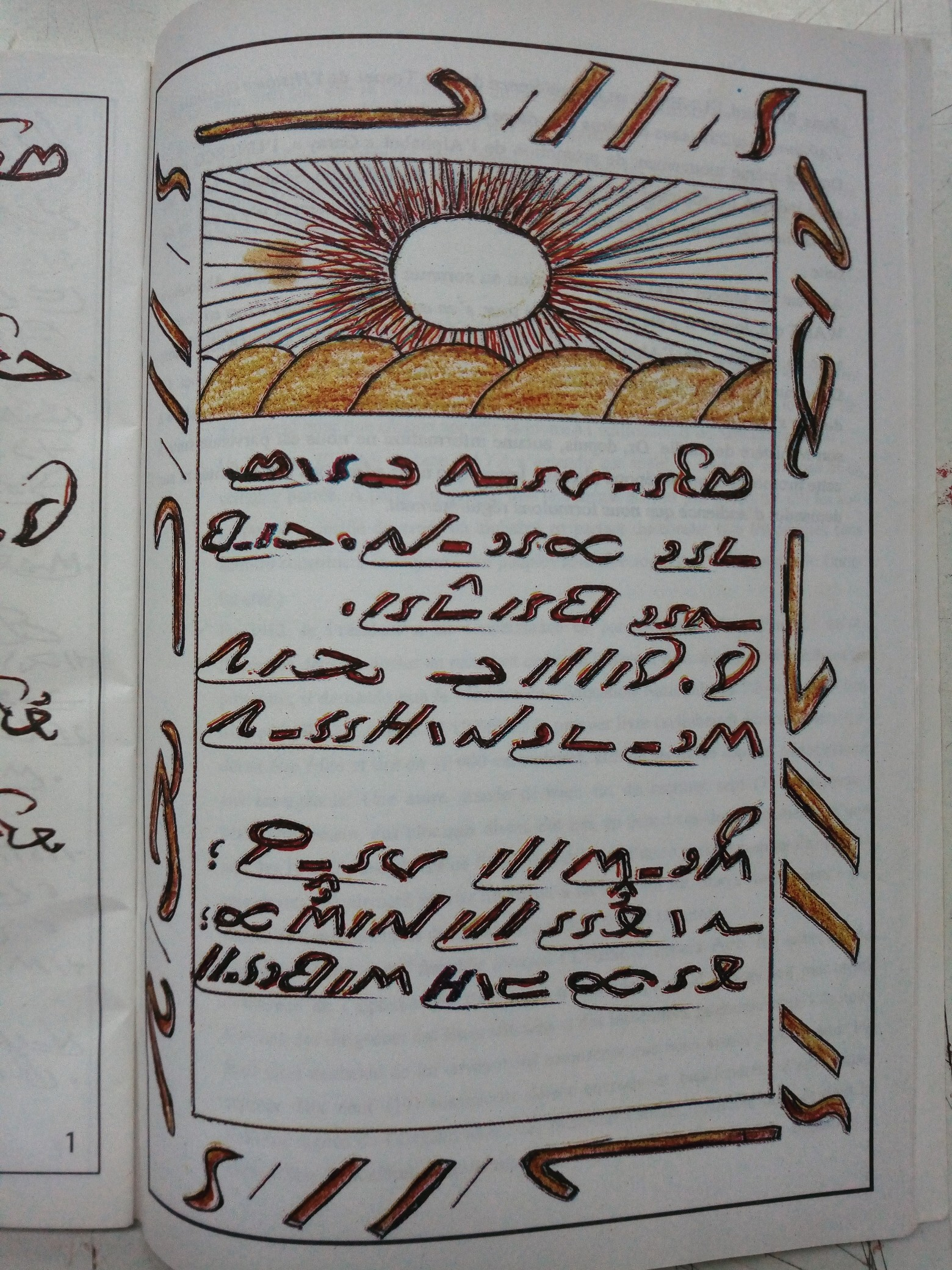
- Script type: alphabet
- Creator: Assane Faye
- Created: 1961
- Direction: Right to left
- Languages: Wolof

ISO 15924
- ISO 15924: Gara (164), Garay

Unicode
- Unicode alias: Garay
- Unicode range: U+10D40–U+10D8F

The Garay alphabet was designed in 1961, as a transcription system "[marrying] African sociolinguistic characteristics" according to its inventor, Assane Faye. This alphabet has 25 consonants and 14 vowels. It is used in particular for the writing of the Wolof language, spoken mostly in Senegal, although that language is more often written in the Latin alphabet and to a lesser extent in the Arabic (Wolofal) alphabet. It is written from right to left, and distinguishes letter case.

== Letters ==
=== Consonants ===
The consonants are written as standalone letters and are not joined as in Arabic.

There is a mark above some letters to show pre-nasalization. The letter labeled alif is used like its counterpart in Arabic, coming before an initial vowel. Extra to the standard Wolof set is /ħ/, available for Arabic loan words. Lacking is /q/, but /k/ may suffice for that. Also lacking is /nk/, but that may easily be formed with a mark above, like /mb/ etc.

In Garay, uppercase letters are distinguished from lowercase letters by a swash added to one side or the other of the letter. Each sentence begins with a capital letter. Personal names are likewise capitalized.

	Nasals				Prenasalized plosives			
IPA	m ⟨m⟩	n ⟨n⟩	ɲ ⟨ñ⟩	ŋ ⟨ŋ⟩	mb ⟨mb⟩	nd ⟨nd⟩	ɲɟ ⟨nj⟩	ŋɡ ⟨ng⟩
Lowercase		(modern form) (old form)						
Uppercase		(modern form) (old form)						
	Voiced plosives				Voiceless plosives			
IPA	b ⟨b⟩	d ⟨d⟩	ɟ ⟨j⟩	ɡ ⟨g⟩	p ⟨p⟩	t ⟨t⟩	c ⟨c⟩	k ⟨k⟩
Lowercase								(modern form) (old form)
Uppercase								(modern form) (old form)
	Fricatives				Liquids and semivowels			
IPA	f ⟨f⟩	s ⟨s⟩	x~χ ⟨x⟩	ħ ⟨h⟩	r ⟨r⟩	w ⟨w⟩	l ⟨l⟩	j ⟨y⟩
Lowercase								
Uppercase								
	Null consonant (alif): carrier of initial vowels							
Lowercase								
Uppercase								

=== Vowels ===
a ⟨a⟩	i ⟨i⟩	ɛ ⟨e⟩	ɔ ⟨o⟩
ə ⟨ë⟩	i^{h}~ii ⟨ih⟩	e ⟨é⟩	u ⟨u⟩

== Unicode ==
The Garay alphabet was added to the Unicode Standard in September 2024 with the release of version 16.0.

The Unicode block for Garay is U+10D40–U+10D8F:

Garay^{[1]}^{[2]} Official Unicode Consortium code chart (PDF)
	0	1	2	3	4	5	6	7	8	9	A	B	C	D	E	F
U+10D4x	𐵀	𐵁	𐵂	𐵃	𐵄	𐵅	𐵆	𐵇	𐵈	𐵉	𐵊	𐵋	𐵌	𐵍	𐵎	𐵏
U+10D5x	𐵐	𐵑	𐵒	𐵓	𐵔	𐵕	𐵖	𐵗	𐵘	𐵙	𐵚	𐵛	𐵜	𐵝	𐵞	𐵟
U+10D6x	𐵠	𐵡	𐵢	𐵣	𐵤	𐵥				𐵩	𐵪	𐵫	𐵬	𐵭	𐵮	𐵯
U+10D7x	𐵰	𐵱	𐵲	𐵳	𐵴	𐵵	𐵶	𐵷	𐵸	𐵹	𐵺	𐵻	𐵼	𐵽	𐵾	𐵿
U+10D8x	𐶀	𐶁	𐶂	𐶃	𐶄	𐶅									𐶎	𐶏
Notes 1.As of Unicode version 18.0 2.Grey areas indicate non-assigned code points

== Bibliography ==
- Rovenchak, Andrij; Faye, Abdou Souleye; Riley, Charles L. (February 19, 2022). Consideration of the encoding of Garay with updated user feedback (revised) (PDF). This is the final revision of the proposal, with significant changes, that was finally accepted for encoding in the UCS by proposers, the UTC, the ISO working groups, the SEI, and other consulted parties. It added a few other characters (notably for distinguishing modern and old variants of base consonant letters Ka and Na, for the transcription of words borrowed from Arabic, for the Garay hyphen, and for two mathematical symbols) and removed some unnecessary consonants (using additional combining characters for nasalized and geminated consonants), keeping space for three additional consonants for the transcription of French words. This proposal was also addressing issues reported on two significant contributions to clarify the encoding model and to solve ambiguities (notably between nasalized consonants and some vowels written as digraphs):
  - Anderson, Deborah; Whistler, Ken; Pournader, Roozbeh; Constable, Peter (January 22, 2022). Recommendations to UTC #170 January 2022 on Script Proposals (PDF).
  - Rovenchak, Andrij; Riley, Charles (May 9, 2011). Recommendations to UTC #155 April-May 2018 on Script Proposals (PDF).
- Everson, Michael (April 26, 2012). Preliminary proposal for encoding the Garay script in the SMP of the UCS (PDF).
- Pandey, Anshuman (May 9, 2011). Introducing the Wolof Alphabet of Assane Faye (PDF).
