= Thomas Natural Shorthand =

English shorthand system

- Script type: light-line semi-script alphabetic Stenography - positional
- Creator: Charles A. Thomas
- Published: 1935
- Time period: 1935-present
- Languages: English

Thomas Natural Shorthand is an English shorthand system created by Charles A. Thomas which was first published in 1935. Thomas described his system as "designed to meet the existing need for a simple, legible shorthand that is based on already familiar writing lines, and that is written with a minimum number of rules." The system has fallen into disuse with the decline of pen shorthand in the later 20th century, but the spirit of the system lives on in Teeline shorthand, with which it shares a number of characteristics (although the symbols used in each system are quite different).

== Characteristics ==
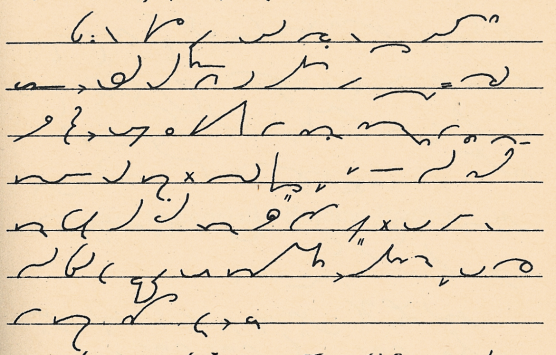
A sample of Thomas Natural Shorthand. The text reads as follows: Dear Sir: Please give the proposition we are enclosing your most earnest consideration. We believe you will find our line a money-maker from the start. We shall appreciate the privilege of sending you samples of those numbers in which you are interested. Mr. Jones, who has charge of our sales in your territory, will call on you about the first of April. We assure you of our desire to co-operate with you in every way possible. Let us know how we may be of immediate service to you. Cordially yours,

Like Gregg shorthand, and unlike the older Pitman shorthand, Thomas Natural Shorthand is a "light-line system", i.e. a system which does not employ shading (light and heavy strokes) to distinguish symbols. Unlike earlier light-line systems such as Pernin phonography (which was based on the Duployan system), cursive rather than angular strokes are employed. However, Thomas Natural differs from Gregg and resembles Pitman in its use of positional writing—vowels are deduced according to whether a form is written on, above, or below the line of writing.

The system aims to be simpler to learn than competing symbol shorthand systems of the time, boasting "only twelve word signs and one abbreviating principle". Total mastery of the system could therefore be achieved much quicker than the major court-reporting systems, and although this simplicity did come with a loss of speed, the speeds achieved were still adequate for secretarial use.

The system's failure to achieve popularity came from its "jack-of-all-trades, master-of-none" position. Those looking for an easy to learn system were far more likely to choose alphabetic systems such as Forkner shorthand or Speedwriting; those interested in developing serious shorthand speed were drawn to more established systems with a court reporting track record such as Gregg or Pitman. To the untrained eye, Thomas Natural shorthand bears a close resemblance to Gregg shorthand (despite being unrelated); it was necessary to actually undertake a study of the system to learn how much simpler it really was than Gregg.

== Comparison with Teeline ==
Teeline shorthand shares largely the same philosophy and approach as Thomas Natural Shorthand; it is however more accessible to beginners since the symbols used are themselves based on the Latin alphabet (although so abstractly that most would consider Teeline a symbol, rather than alphabetic, system). The Thomas Natural symbols, on the other hand, were chosen for speed rather than familiarity. Furthermore, Thomas Natural was published in the 1930s-1940s, at a time when alphabetic systems were just beginning their ascendency, whereas in the contemporary era in which Teeline is being promoted, the limitations of the alphabetic systems have made them less attractive than formerly, when their potential seemed greater.
