= Deutsche Einheitskurzschrift =

German shorthand system

- Kurzschrift
- Script type: heavy-line script mixed-Abugida Stenography
- Creator: expert committee
- Period: 1924-present
- Languages: German

Related scripts
- Parent systems: Gabelsberger shorthand: Deutsche Einheitskurzschrift

Deutsche Einheitskurzschrift (DEK, German Unified Shorthand) is a German stenography system. DEK is the official shorthand system in Germany and Austria today. It is used for word-for-word recordings of debates in the Federal Parliament of Germany.

== Development ==
The original version of DEK was created by an expert committee in 1924, based on the ideas of earlier systems like those of Gabelsberger, Faulmann, and Stolze-Schrey. Revised versions were introduced in 1936 and 1968.

The latest reform of the Einheitskurzschrift was concluded in Vienna in 1962 after many years of work and officially introduced into the German educational system in Mainz in 1968 by the German Kultusministerkonferenz (State Conference on Education) as the Wiener Urkunde (“Vienna Document”) titled Systemurkunde der Deutschen Einheitskurzschrift - Wiener Urkunde - vom 1. August 1968. This may be considered largely the brainchild of Georg Paucker, who (as representative of the German Confederation of Trade Unions) applied himself particularly to the reform negotiations regarding the Verkehrsschrift.

== Principles ==
=== Writing system ===
„Schaden“, noun, or „schaden“, verb, depending on context

DEK is based on indirect indication of vowels. There are several graphemes for common consonant-sequences and for single consonants, too. Vowels are indicated through the positional relation of two following consonant-graphemes in the line-system. For instance sch [ʃ] is represented by one grapheme. To write the word sch-e-sch, which is not an actual German word, one and another sch-grapheme is connected by a short line at the same height above the line. The e is indicated by the short connection between them. Furthermore, not only the relation is relevant, but the line pressure, too. That is why DEK is designed for pencils. An a would be indicated by a short connection and a heavier down-line of the following consonant-grapheme. Up-lines are not written with a heavy line for speed reasons. All in all, shorthand reduces words to syllables, where whole syllables are written at once.

Writing DEK employs many spelling simplifications. The writing system does not know the notion of upper-case or lower-case letters. However, sometimes it is necessary to indicate capital letters. This is done by underlining the respective grapheme. Moreover, while spelling individual words the sound of a word takes precedence, unless this may cause confusion with other words that fit just as well in the given context. For example, Schäden (correct spelling) is usually written as scheden (incorrect spelling), because ensuring proper spelling with ä does not convey any meaning.

abbreviation for „ist“

Beside the basic system there is a huge set of static unpaired abbreviations. For example, the German form of to be, 3rd person singular indicative present tense ist is a single dot on the upper line. These additional symbols must be learned by repetition.

=== Rulesets ===
Since the 1968 reform, DEK is written at three levels: Verkehrsschrift, Eilschrift and Redeschrift – correspondence style, quick style and reporters' style – each building up on the lower level. A text in Verkehrsschrift can be produced at a rate of 80 to 120 syllables per minute. Eilschrift and particularly Redeschrift employ contractions and other simplifications to a far greater extent, making rates of up to 475 syllables per minute possible. This enables real-time recordings of speeches. The current speed record using DEK is 520 syllables per minute and was achieved by Josef Hrycyk in 1974.

=== Individual adjustments ===
The Systemurkunde grants the permission for stenographers to invent highly personalized contractions. For instance, in a parliament most speeches start with Sehr geehrte Damen und Herren, Herr Präsident (or Frau Präsidentin respectively). A parliament stenographer may create a contraction that records this frequently used phrase in a single stroke.

Another widespread optimization is to omit writing punctuation marks and indicate units of speech by blank lines instead. After all, punctuation marks are neither pronounced, nor are they heard. For example, proper German question phrases contain interrogatives, thus the question mark is redundant. Instead, punctuating is done during transcription.

== Reception ==
=== Foreign language adaptions ===
Shorthand writers do not usually learn shorthand systems of other languages, if they have to write in foreign languages only occasionally. Someone might get confused by totally different systems. Instead, there are several adaptations of DEK for other languages, such as English, French, Spanish, Swedish, Russian, and even Latin. The English adaptation created by Lege and Bäse (see links), which is the most popular English adaptation of DEK, allows speeds up to 300 syllables per minute and more.

=== Criticism ===
DEK faced a lot of criticism, especially during the prime of shorthand; for example, the heavier versions of consonant-graphemes and the complex ruleset were said to slow down learning-speed. As a result, there have been efforts to create simpler shorthand systems that can be learned more quickly but may not achieve comparable speeds. One of these alternative systems is Stiefografie.

== Publications ==
- Amtliche Systemurkunde der Deutschen Einheitskurzschrift — Wiener Urkunde — [official System-document of the German Unified Shorhand — Vienna Document —] (in German). Darmſtadt: Winklers Verlag • Gebrüder Grimm.
