= Robert Boyd (stenographer) =

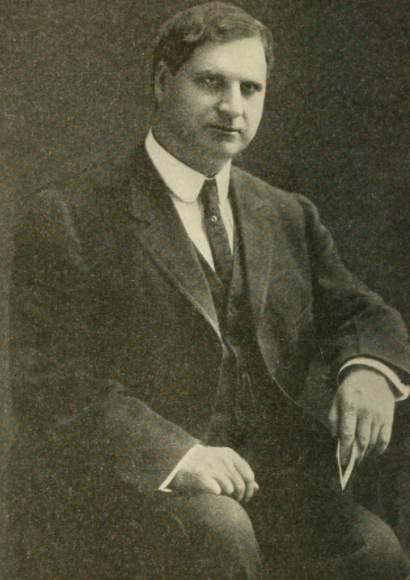
- Born: 1870
- Occupations: Stenographer, academic

Robert Boyd (born 10 April 1870), of Russell, Ontario, Canada, was the inventor of a system of shorthand, Boyd's Syllabic Shorthand. The system was first published in 1903, with a later publication in 1912.
