= Boyd's syllabic shorthand =

Shorthand system invented by Robert Boyd

- Script type: geometric Abugida Stenography
- Creator: Robert Boyd
- Published: 1903 (1912)
- Period: 1903-present
- Languages: English

Boyd's syllabic shorthand is a system of shorthand invented by Robert Boyd, published originally in 1903, and updated in 1912. In this system, symbols are distinguished both by orientation and by shape, with the shape representing the vowel and the orientation the consonant. Thus, "ab" and "am" would be represented by the same shape of mark (in this case an L-shape), oriented differently; and "ab" and "eb" would be represented by differently shaped marks, oriented the same way.

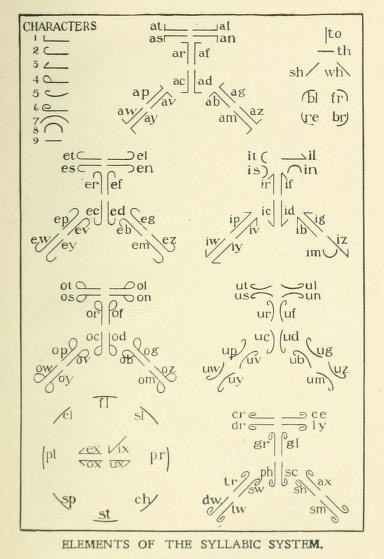
Characters used in Boyd Syllabic Shorthand

Syllables with the vowel "a" are represented by L shapes. Those with the vowel "e" are hook-ended, approximately shaped like a "J." (However, a smaller version of the same shape represents an extra consonant without a vowel.) Most of the syllables with the vowel "i" have a shape like the "a" series, except that the angle between the short tick and the long line is approximately 45° rather than 90°; there are a few "i" forms that do not fit the pattern (such as "is" and "it") because they are especially common, and some of the forms that might be expected to represent "i" plus a consonant have been turned to other purposes, such as the prefix "circum-." The syllables with the vowel "o" have ovaline ends, and those with "u" have hooks like those of the "e" series, but the main, longer part of the mark is curved, rather than straight.

In addition to these syllables, there are several additional characters including a simple straight line, a shallow curve, and a line with a curl at the end. These are assigned arbitrarily to combinations of sounds such as "fl," "sp," "gr," and "ch." The 1912 edition of the system expands the use of these characters to include longer sequences like "contr" and "circum."

To make up for the lack of characters representing ⟨qu⟩ and ⟨h⟩, the "ux" character can be used for the former, and a symbol similar to ` can be used for h in initial positions and y or ty in final positions. There are also symbols for a, e, i/j, and o, being a small left half of a circle, a cursive e, a small right half circle, and an oval respectively. The symbol for el can also be used for [l̩].

Letters and reversal of them, are similar to optical telegraph letters.

== See also ==
- Canadian Aboriginal syllabics
- Simson Shorthand
