= Gabelsberger shorthand =

Writing system

- Script type: light-line script mixed abugida Shorthand
- Creator: Franz Xaver Gabelsberger
- Created: ≈1817
- Published: 1834
- Period: 1834-1924
- Languages: German

Related scripts
- Child systems: German Unified Shorthand (Deutsche Einheitskurzschrift); Bezenšek Shorthand; Gabelsberger-Noë Shorthand

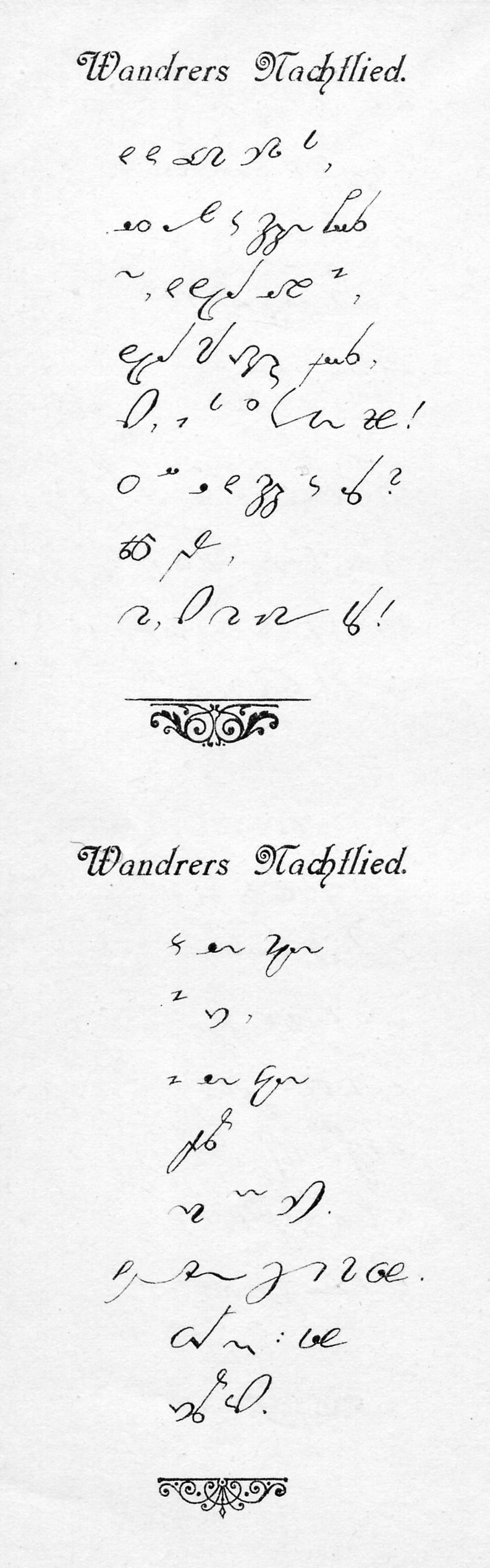
Both Wanderer's Nightsongs by Goethe in Gabelsberger shorthand

Gabelsberger shorthand is a form of shorthand previously common in Germany and Austria. Created around 1817 by Franz Xaver Gabelsberger, it was first fully described in the 1834 textbook Anleitung zur deutschen Redezeichenkunst oder Stenographie and rapidly became used.

Gabelsberger shorthand has a full alphabet with signs for both consonants and vowels. The consonant signs were made by simplifying the features of cursive Latin letters. The vowel signs are used mainly when a vowel stands at the beginning or the end of a word. Vowels in the middle of words are represented symbolically, mainly by varying the position and the impact of the following consonant signs. Contrary to the practice in many English shorthand systems (e.g. Pitman Shorthand), vowels are never entirely omitted.

Most German shorthand systems published after 1834 are ultimately based on Gabelsberger's system. Modern German shorthand, Deutsche Einheitskurzschrift, retains most of the consonant signs of Gabelsberger's alphabet but has a modified system of vowel representation.

Gabelsberger shorthand was adopted into many languages and was particularly successful in Scandinavia, the Slavic countries and Italy. A host of shorthand systems has since appeared that build on the graphic principles laid down by Gabelsberger.
