= Franz Xaver Gabelsberger =

German inventor of writing system

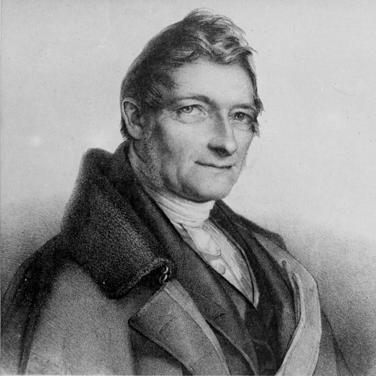
- Inventor of a shorthand system
- Born: 9 February 1789; Munich, Electorate of Bavaria
- Died: 4 January 1849 (aged 59); Munich, Kingdom of Bavaria

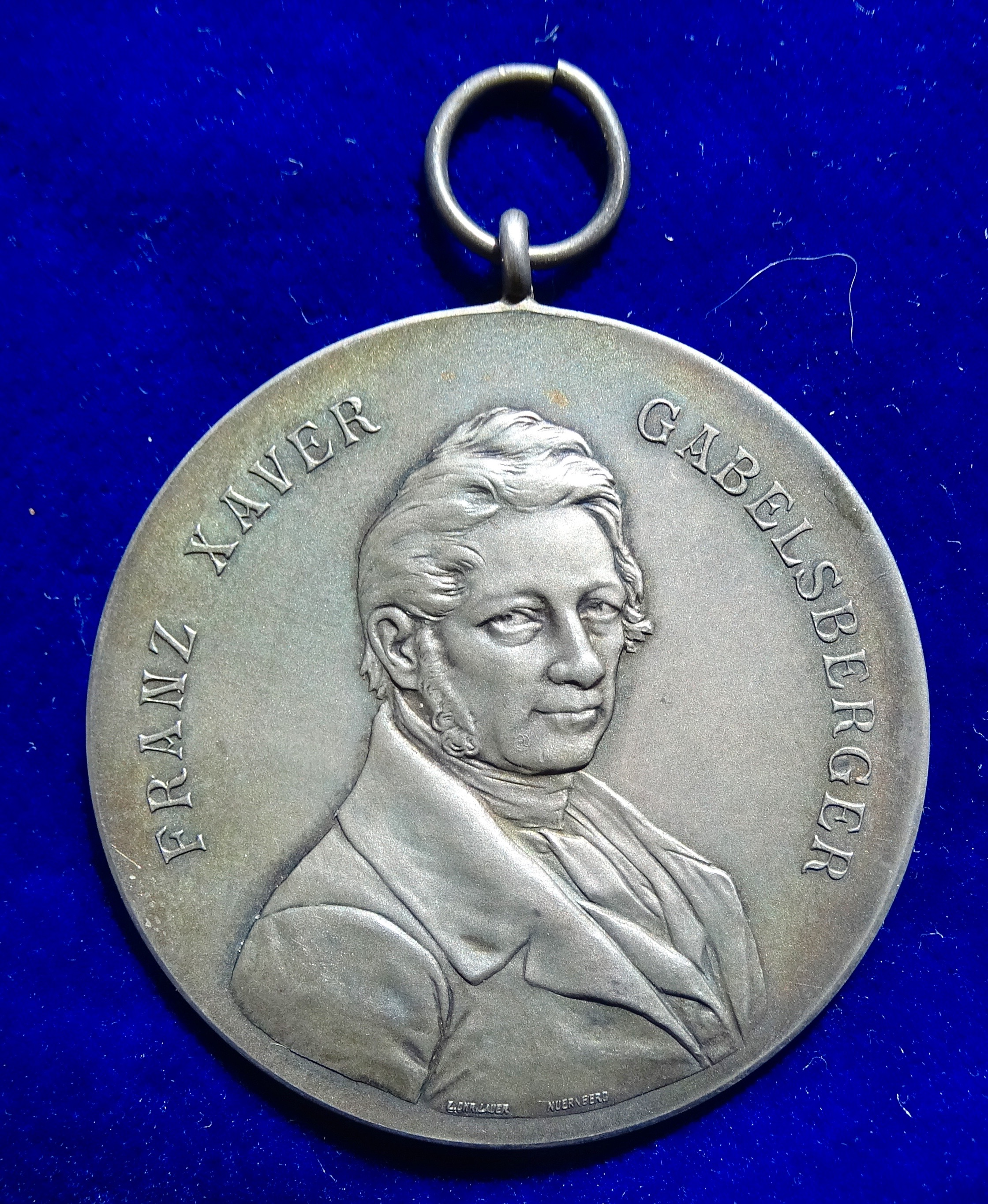
Gabelsberger Shorthand Silver Award Medal of the Hanover Stenographen-Verein of 1863, obverse.

Franz Xaver Gabelsberger (9 February 1789, Munich - 4 January 1849, Munich) was a German stenographer; the inventor of Gabelsberger shorthand.

== Biography ==
His father was a wind instrument manufacturer, originally from Mainburg, who died while Franz was still in school. As a result, he was transferred to a convent school and finished his studies at the Alten Gymnasium in 1807. He was unable to pursue his education further, due to lack of funds and poor health. Instead, he entered the civil service of the newly established Kingdom of Bavaria.

His superiors were impressed by his skills in calligraphy. Meanwhile, he was contemplating a system that would make writing faster and easier. In 1817, he began to develop his system. As the German bureaucracies expanded, rapid transcription became essential. England and France already had such systems, but they proved difficult to adapt to German. Gabelsberger's method caught on quickly, and he became the first stenographer for the Bavarian State Parliament.

He was also promoted to Ministerial Secretary, and his system was certified by the Bavarian Academy of Sciences and Humanities as being more reliable and legible than previous systems. Later, he was awarded 1,000 Gulden per year, half of which was to be used for his shorthand students. His method was officially named and published in 1834. He designed an abbreviation typeface in 1840.

In 1849, he suffered a stroke while out for a walk, and died shortly after. He was interred in the Alter Südfriedhof. From then until 1902, his system was revised three times. By that time, the number of users was estimated to be four million. Monuments have been dedicated to him in Munich, Vienna, and Traunstein. Streets in numerous German and Austrian cities are named after him. The medal of honor awarded by the German Stenographers' Association bears his likeness.

== Sources ==
- Franz Gabelsberger und seine Kunst. Festschrift. G. Franzscher Verlag, Munich 1890 (Online)
- E. Bauer (1878). "Gabelsberger, Franz Xaver". Allgemeine Deutsche Biographie (in German). Vol. 8. Leipzig: Duncker & Humblot. pp. 291–293.
- Rudolf Weinmeister (1964). "Gabelsberger, Franz Xaver". Neue Deutsche Biographie (in German). Vol. 6. Berlin: Duncker & Humblot. pp. 4–5. (full text online).
- Jürgen Wurst: "Franz Xaver Gabelsberger". In: üAlexander Langheiter (Ed.): Monachia. Städtische Galerie im Lenbachhaus. Munich 2005, ISBN 3-88645-156-9, pg.169
- Emil Zehl: Der Gabelsberger Stenographen-Verein zu Leipzig von 1846–1896 (Online)
- Joseph Alteneder, Franz Xaver Gabelsberger, Erfinder der deutschen Stenographie, Vol. 1: "Gabelsbergers Lebensverhältnisse und öffentliche Tätigkeit", G. Franzscher Verlag, 1902 (Online)
