= List of writing systems =

Writing systems currently in use around the world; The usual name of the script is given first; the name of the languages in which the script is written follows (in brackets), particularly in the case where the language name differs from the script name. Other informative or qualifying annotations for the script may also be provided.

Writing systems are used to record human language, and may be classified according to certain common features.

== Proto-writing and ideographic systems ==
Ideographic scripts (in which graphemes are ideograms representing concepts or ideas rather than a specific word in a language) and pictographic scripts (in which the graphemes are iconic pictures) are not thought to be able to express all that can be communicated by language, as argued by the linguists John DeFrancis and J. Marshall Unger. Essentially, they postulate that no true writing system can be completely pictographic or ideographic; it must be able to refer directly to a language in order to have the full expressive capacity of a language. Unger disputes claims made on behalf of Blissymbols in his 2004 book Ideogram.

Although a few pictographic or ideographic scripts exist today, there is no single way to read them because there is no one-to-one correspondence between symbol and language. Hieroglyphs were commonly thought to be ideographic before they were translated, and to this day, Chinese is often erroneously said to be ideographic. In some cases of ideographic scripts, only the author of a text can read it with any certainty, and it may be said that they are interpreted rather than read. Such scripts often work best as mnemonic aids for oral texts or as outlines that will be fleshed out in speech.

- Adinkra (Akan language)
- Birch-bark glyphs (Ojibwe)
- Dongba (Naxi). Often supplemented with syllabic Geba script.
- Ersu Shaba script (Ersu)
- Kaidā glyphs
- Lusona
- Lukasa (Luba-Kasai language)
- Nsibidi (Ekoi, Efik, Igbo)
- Siglas poveiras
- Testerian. Used for missionary work in Mexico.

There are also symbol systems used to represent things other than language:

- Emojis: Used as expressive icons in modern media
- Blissymbols: A constructed ideographic script used primarily in Augmentative and Alternative Communication (AAC)
- iConji: A constructed ideographic script used primarily in social networking
- Isotype
- LoCoS
- A wide variety of notation systems

== Logographic systems ==
In logographic writing systems, glyphs represent words or morphemes (meaningful components of words, as in mean-ing-ful) rather than phonetic elements.

No logographic script is composed solely of logograms; all contain graphemes that represent phonetic (sound-based) elements as well. These phonetic elements may be used on their own (to represent, for example, grammatical inflections or foreign words), or may serve as phonetic complements to a logogram (used to specify the sound of a logogram that might otherwise represent more than one word). In the case of Chinese, the phonetic element is built into the logogram itself; in Egyptian and Mayan, many glyphs are purely phonetic, whereas others function as either logograms or phonetic elements, depending on context. For this reason, many such scripts may be more properly referred to as logosyllabic or complex scripts; the terminology used is largely a product of custom in the field, and is to an extent arbitrary.

=== Consonant-based logographies ===
- Hieroglyphic, Hieratic, and Demotic – the writing systems of Ancient Egypt
  - Egyptian language

=== Syllable-based logographies ===
- Anatolian hieroglyphs – Luwian.
- Cuneiform – Sumerian, Akkadian, other Semitic languages, Elamite, Hittite, Luwian, Hurrian, and Urartian.
- Aegean scripts – Cretan hieroglyphs, Linear A (Minoan language) and Linear B (Mycenaean Greek).
- Chinese characters – Chinese, Japanese (called Kanji), Korean (called Hanja), Vietnamese (called Chữ Hán, obsolete).
  - Sawndip – Zhuang
  - Chữ Nôm – Vietnamese
  - Khitan large script – Khitan
  - Khitan small script – Khitan
  - Jurchen script – Jurchen
  - Tangut script – Tangut
- Sui script – Sui language
- Yi (classical) – various Yi/Lolo languages
- Pau Cin Hau logographic script – Tedim
- Eghap (or Bagam) script – Məgaka
- Mi'kmaw hieroglyphs – originally a pictorial system, transformed into a logographic system by French priest Father Le Clerq.
- Maya script – Ch'olan, Yucatecan and Tzeltalan, especially Epigraphic Ch'olti'.
- Mixteca-Puebla script – Nahuan languages, especially Classical Nahuatl (Aztec script), Mixtecan languages (Mixtec script), others.

== Syllabaries ==
In a syllabary, graphemes represent syllables or moras. (The 19th-century term syllabics usually referred to abugidas rather than true syllabaries.)

- Afaka – Ndyuka
- Alaska or Yugtun script – Central Yup'ik
- Bété
- Cherokee – Cherokee
- Cypro-Minoan – Cypro-Minoan (probably ancestral to Eteocypriot).
- Cypriot – Arcadocypriot Greek, Eteocypriot
- Geba – Naxi
- Iban or Dunging script – Iban
- Kana – Japanese (although primarily based on moras rather than syllables).
  - Hiragana
  - Katakana
  - Man'yōgana
- Kikakui – Mende
- Kpelle – Kpelle
- Lisu Bamboo script
- Loma – Loma
- Masaba – Bambara
- Nüshu – Chinese
- Nwagu Aneke script – Igbo
- Vai – Vai
- Woleaian – Woleaian (a likely syllabary)
- Yi (modern) – various Yi/Lolo languages

=== Semi-syllabaries ===
In most of these systems, some consonant-vowel combinations are written as syllables, but others are written as consonant plus vowel. In the case of Old Persian, all vowels were written regardless, so it was effectively a true alphabet despite its syllabic component. In Japanese, a similar system plays a minor role in foreign borrowings; for example, [tu] is often written as <to> + reduced-size <u>, and [ti] as <te> + reduced-size <i>. These syllables and a few others, which do not exist in a conservative phonology of modern Japanese, are nevertheless needed for loanwords which the Japanese are increasingly intent on pronouncing as close as possible to the source language, hence the orthographic innovation. Paleohispanic semi-syllabaries behaved as a syllabary for the stop consonants and as an alphabet for the rest of consonants and vowels.

The Tartessian or Southwestern script is typologically intermediate between a pure alphabet and the Paleohispanic full semi-syllabaries. Although the letter used to write a stop consonant was determined by the following vowel, as in a full semi-syllabary, the following vowel was also written, as in an alphabet. Some scholars treat Tartessian as a redundant semi-syllabary, others treat it as a redundant alphabet. Other scripts, such as Bopomofo, are semi-syllabic in a different sense: they transcribe half syllables. That is, they have letters for syllable onsets and rimes (kan = "k-an") rather than for consonants and vowels (kan = "k-a-n").

==== Consonant-vowel semi-syllabaries ====
- Bamum script – Bamum (a defective syllabary, with alphabetic principles used to fill the gaps)
- Eskayan – Bohol, Philippines (a syllabary apparently based on an alphabet; some alphabetic characteristics remain)
- Linear Elamite – Elamite language
- Paleohispanic semi-syllabaries – Paleo-Hispanic languages
  - Celtiberian script – Celtiberian language
  - Northeastern Iberian script – Iberian language
  - Southeastern Iberian script – Iberian language
  - Southwest Paleohispanic script – Tartessian
- Old Persian cuneiform – Old Persian

==== Onset-rime semi-syllabaries ====
- Bopomofo – phonetic script for different varieties of Chinese.
- Khom script – Bahnaric languages, including Alak and Jru'.
- Quốc Âm Tân Tự – Vietnamese

== Segmental systems ==
A segmental script has graphemes which represent the phonemes (basic unit of sound) of a language.

Note that there need not be (and rarely is) a one-to-one correspondence between the graphemes of the script and the phonemes of a language. A phoneme may be represented only by some combination or string of graphemes, the same phoneme may be represented by more than one distinct grapheme, the same grapheme may stand for more than one phoneme, or some combination of all of the above.

Segmental scripts may be further divided according to the types of phonemes they typically record:

=== Abjads ===
An abjad is a segmental script containing symbols for consonants only, or where vowels are optionally written with diacritics ("pointing") or only written word-initially.

- Ancient North Arabian – Dadanitic, Dumaitic, Hasaitic, Hismaic, Safaitic, Taymanitic, and Thamudic
- Ancient South Arabian – Old South Arabian languages including Himyaritic, Hadhramautic, Minaean, Sabaean and Qatabanic; also the Ethiopic language Geʽez.
- Libyco-Berber –Berber languages
- Aramaic, including Khwarezmian (aka Chorasmian), Elymaic, Palmyrene, and Hatran
- Arabic – Arabic, Paleo-Arabic, Azeri, Bengali (historical occasion), Chittagonian (historical occasion), Punjabi, Baluchi, Kashmiri, Pashto, Persian, Kurdish (vowels obligatory), Sindhi, Uighur (vowels obligatory), Urdu, Malay (as Jawi) and many other languages spoken in Africa and Western, Central, and Southeast Asia,
- Hebrew – Hebrew and other Jewish languages
- Manichaean script
- Nabataean – the Nabataeans of Petra
- Pahlavi script – Middle Persian
  - Parthian
  - Psalter
- Phoenician – Phoenician and other Canaanite languages
- Proto-Canaanite and Proto-Sinaitic – Bronze Age Canaanites.
- Sogdian –Sogdian language
- Samaritan (Old Hebrew) – Aramaic, Arabic, and Hebrew
- Syriac – Classical Syriac, Sureth, Turoyo and other Neo-Aramaic dialects
- Tifinagh – Tuareg
- Ugaritic – Ugaritic, Hurrian

=== True alphabets ===
A true alphabet contains separate letters (not diacritic marks) for both consonants and vowels.

==== Linear nonfeatural alphabets ====
Writing systems used in countries of Europe. (Note: This maps shows languages official in the respective countries; if a country has an independent breakaway republic, both languages are shown. Moldova's sole official language is Romanian (Latin-based), but the unrecognized de facto independent republic of Transnistria uses three Cyrillic-based languages: Ukrainian, Russian, and Moldovan. Georgia's official languages are Georgian and Abkhazian (in Autonomous Republic of Abkhazia), the sparsely recognized de facto independent republics of Abkhazia and South Ossetia use Cyrillic-based languages: Both republics use Russian. Additionally, Abkhazia also uses Abkhaz, and South Ossetia uses Ossetian. Additionally, Serbia's sole official language is Cyrillic Serbian, but within the country, Latin script for Serbian is also widely used.) Greek Greek & Latin (Cyprus) Latin Latin & Cyrillic (Bosnia, Serbia, North Macedonia) Cyrillic Georgian Armenian

Linear alphabets are composed of lines on a surface, such as ink on paper.

- A·chik Tokbirim – Garo
- Adlam – Fula
- Alifuru – Bahasa tanah languages
- Armenian – Armenian
- Ariyaka script – Pali, Isan, Lao
- Avestan – Avestan
- Avoiuli – Raga
- Borama – Somali
- Carian – Carian
- Caucasian Albanian – Caucasian Albanian
- Coorgi–Cox alphabet – Kodava
- Coptic – Egyptian
- Cyrillic – Eastern South Slavic languages (Bulgarian and Macedonian), the Western South Slavic Serbian, Eastern Slavic languages (Belarusian, Russian, Ukrainian), the other languages of Russia, Kazakh language, Kyrgyz language, Tajik language, Mongolian language. Azerbaijan, Turkmenistan, and Uzbekistan are changing to the Latin alphabet but still have considerable use of Cyrillic. See Languages using Cyrillic.
- Deseret alphabet – proposed for English but never adopted
- Eclectic shorthand – English
- Elbasan – Albanian
- Fraser – Lisu
- Gabelsberger shorthand – German
- Garay – Wolof and Mandinka
- Georgian – Georgian and other Kartvelian languages
- Gjirokastër (also called Veso Bey) – Albanian
- Glagolitic – Old Church Slavonic
- Gothic – Gothic
- Greek – Greek, historically a variety of other languages
- Hanifi – Rohingya
- Hurûf-ı munfasıla – proposed for Ottoman Turkish but never widely adopted
- International Phonetic Alphabet
- Kaddare – Somali
- Latin aka Roman – originally Latin language; most current western and central European languages, Turkic languages, sub-Saharan African languages, indigenous languages of the Americas, languages of maritime Southeast Asia and languages of Oceania use developments of it. Languages using a non-Latin writing system are generally also equipped with Romanization for transliteration or secondary use.
- Lycian – Lycian
- Lydian – Lydian
- Manchu – Manchu
- Mandaic – Mandaic dialect of Aramaic
- Medefaidrin – also called Obɛri Ɔkaimɛ; used for the religious language of the same name
- Mongolian – Mongolian
- Mundari Bani – Mundari
- Mru script – Mru
- Neo-Tifinagh – Tamazight
- Nyiakeng Puachue Hmong – Hmong
- N'Ko – Maninka language, Bambara, Dyula language
- Oduduwa script – Yoruba
- Ogham – Gaelic, Britannic, Pictish
- Ol Chiki aka Ol Cemet' or Ol Chemet' – Santali
- Old Hungarian (in Hungarian magyar rovásírás or székely-magyar rovásírás) – Hungarian
- Old Italic – a family of connected alphabets for the Etruscan, Oscan, Umbrian, Messapian, South Picene, Raetic, Venetic, Lepontic, Camunic languages
- Old Permic (also called Abur) – Komi
- Old Turkic – Old Turkic
- Old Uyghur – Old Uyghur
- Ol Onal – Bhumij Language
- Osmanya – Somali
- Pau Cin Hau alphabetic script – Paite and other Northeastern Kuki-Chin languages
- Runes – Germanic languages
- Sayaboury (also called Eebee Hmong or Ntawv Puaj Txwm) – Hmong Daw
- Sorang Sompeng – Sora
- Tai Lue – Lue
- Tangsa – Tangsa language
- Todhri – Albanian
- Tolong Siki, Kurukh Banna – Kurukh
- Toto – Toto
- Unifon – proposed for English, never adopted
- Vah – Bassa
- Vellara – Albanian
- Vithkuqi aka Beitha Kukju – Albanian
- Wancho – Wancho
- Yezidi – Kurmanji
- Zaghawa – Zaghawa
- Zoulai – Zou (also has alphasyllabic characteristics)

==== Featural linear alphabets ====
A featural script has elements that indicate the components of articulation, such as bilabial consonants, fricatives, or back vowels. Scripts differ in how many features they indicate.

- ASL-phabet
- Ditema tsa Dinoko aka IsiBheqe SoHlamvu for Southern Bantu languages
- Duployan Shorthand
- Gregg Shorthand
- Hangul – Korean
- Osage – Osage
- Shavian alphabet – proposed for English, never adopted
- SignWriting and its descendants si5s and ASLwrite for sign languages
- Stokoe notation for American Sign Language, and its descendant, the Hamburg Notation System or HamNoSys
- Tengwar (a fictional script)
- Visible Speech (a phonetic script)

==== Linear alphabets arranged into syllabic blocks ====
- Hangul – Korean
- Great Lakes Algonquian syllabics – Fox, Potawatomi, Ho-Chunk, Ojibwe
- IsiBheqe SoHlamvu – Southern Bantu languages
- ʼPhags-pa script – Mongolian, Chinese, Persian, Sanskrit

==== Manual alphabets ====
Manual alphabets are frequently found as parts of sign languages. They are not used for writing per se, but for spelling out words while signing.

- American manual alphabet (used with slight modification in Hong Kong, Malaysia, Paraguay, Philippines, Singapore, Taiwan, Thailand)
- British manual alphabet (used in some of the Commonwealth of Nations, such as Australia and New Zealand)
- Catalan manual alphabet
- Chilean manual alphabet
- Chinese manual alphabet
- Dutch manual alphabet
- Ethiopian manual alphabet (an abugida)
- French manual alphabet
- Greek manual alphabet
- Icelandic manual alphabet (also used in Denmark)
- Indian manual alphabet (a true alphabet?; used in Devanagari and Gujarati areas)
- International manual alphabet (used in Germany, Austria, Norway, Finland)
- Iranian manual alphabet (an abjad; also used in Egypt)
- Israeli manual alphabet (an abjad)
- Italian manual alphabet
- Korean manual alphabet
- Latin American manual alphabets
- Polish manual alphabet
- Portuguese manual alphabet
- Romanian manual alphabet
- Russian manual alphabet (also used in Bulgaria and ex-Soviet states)
- Spanish manual alphabet (Madrid)
- Swedish manual alphabet
- Yugoslav manual alphabet

==== Other non-linear alphabets ====
These are other alphabets composed of something other than lines on a surface.

- Braille (Unified) – an embossed alphabet for the visually impaired, used with some extra letters to transcribe the Latin, Cyrillic, Greek, Hebrew, and Arabic alphabets, as well as Chinese
- Braille (Korean)
- Braille (American) (defunct)
- New York Point – a defunct alternative to Braille
- International maritime signal flags (both alphabetic and ideographic)
- Morse code (International) – a trinary code of dashes, dots, and silence, whether transmitted by electricity, light, or sound) representing characters in the Latin alphabet.
- American Morse code (defunct)
- Optical telegraphy (defunct)
- Flag semaphore – (made by moving hand-held flags)

=== Abugidas ===
An abugida, or alphasyllabary, is a segmental script in which vowel sounds are denoted by diacritical marks or other systematic modification of the consonants. Generally, however, if a single letter is understood to have an inherent unwritten vowel, and only vowels other than this are written, then the system is classified as an abugida regardless of whether the vowels look like diacritics or full letters. The vast majority of abugidas are found from India to Southeast Asia and belong historically to the Brāhmī family, however the term is derived from the first characters of the abugida in Ge'ez: አ (a) ቡ (bu) ጊ (gi) ዳ (da) — (compare with alphabet). Unlike abjads, the diacritical marks and systemic modifications of the consonants are not optional.

==== Brahmi family ====
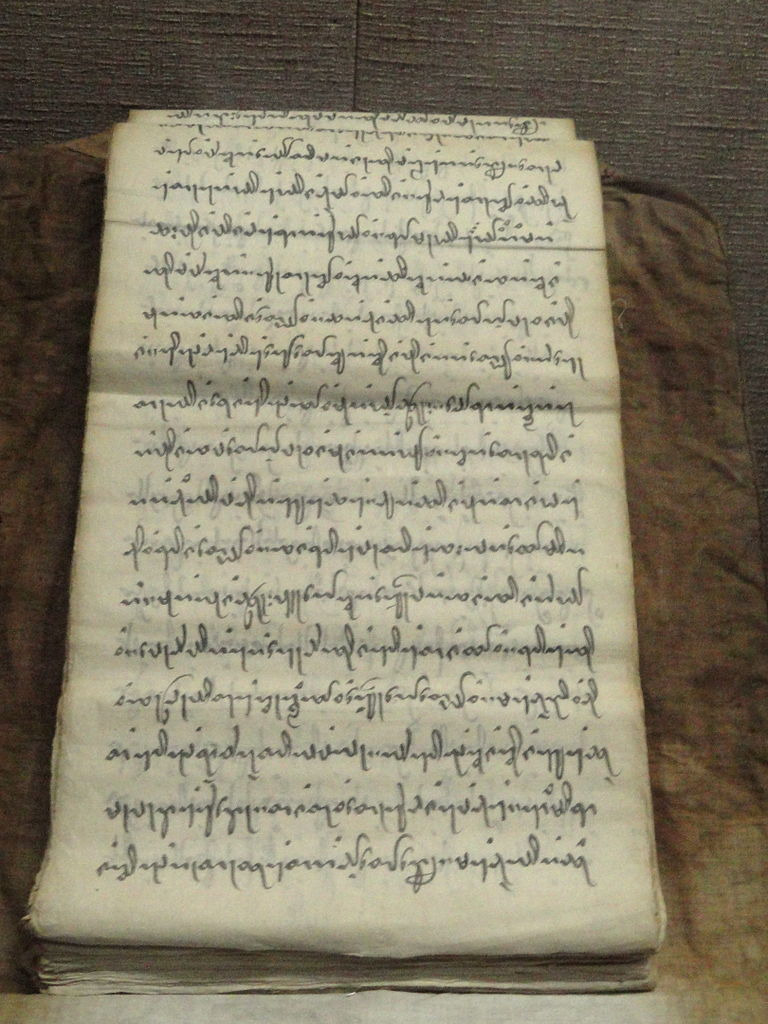
A Palaung manuscript written in a Brahmic abugida

- Ahom
- Assamese – Formerly used for Assamese, now in decline
- Balinese
- Batak – Toba and other Batak languages
- Baybayin – Formerly used for Ilokano, Pangasinan, Tagalog, Bikol languages, Visayan languages, and possibly other Philippine languages
- Bengali — Bengali, Assamese, Meithei, Bishnupriya Manipuri
- Bhaiksuki
- Brahmi – Sanskrit, Prakrit
- Buda – Old Sundanese and Old Javanese
- Buhid
- Burmese – Burmese, Karen languages, Mon, and Shan
- Cham
- Chakma
- Devanagari – Hindi, Sanskrit, Marathi, Nepali, and many other languages of northern India
- Dhives Akuru
- Grantha – Sanskrit
- Gujarati – Gujarati, Kutchi, Vasavi, Sanskrit, Avestan
- Gurmukhi script – Punjabi
- Goykanadi – Formerly used for Konkani
- Hanuno’o
- Javanese
- Kaithi
- Kannada – Kannada, Tulu, Konkani, Kodava
- Kawi
- Khema script – Gurung
- Khojki
- Khudabadi
- Khmer
- Kirat Rai aka Khambu Rai – Bantawa
- Kulitan alphabet
- Lai Tay – Tai Yo
- Lampung
- Lao
- Leke – Eastern Pwo, Western Pwo, and Karen
- Lepcha
- Limbu
- Lontara’ – Buginese, Makassar, and Mandar
- Mahajani
- Makasar – Formerly used for Makassar
- Malayalam
- Marchen – Zhang-Zhung
- Meitei Mayek – Meitei
- Modi – Marathi
- Multani – Saraiki
- Nandinagari – Sanskrit
- Naoriya Phulo script – Meitei
- New Tai Lue
- Odia
- Ogan – South Barisan Malay (Ogan dialect)
- Pracalit script aka Newa – Nepal Bhasa, Sanskrit, Pali
- Pyu – Pyu
- Ranjana – Nepal Bhasa, Sanskrit
- Rejang
- Rencong
- Saurashtra
- Sharada – Sanskrit, Kashmiri
- Siddham – Sanskrit
- Sinhala
- Sirmauri
- Soyombo
- Sundanese
- Sylheti Nagri – Sylheti
- Tagbanwa – Languages of Palawan
- Tai Le aka Dehong Dai – Tai Nuea
- Tai Tham – Khün, and Northern Thai
- Tai Viet
- Takri
- Tamil
- Telugu
- Thai
- Tibetan
- Tigalari – Sanskrit, Tulu
- Tirhuta – used to write Maithili
- Tocharian
- Vatteluttu
- Zanabazar Square
- Zhang zhung scripts

==== Other abugidas ====
- Canadian Aboriginal syllabics – Cree syllabics (for Cree), Inuktitut syllabics (for Inuktitut), Ojibwe syllabics (for Ojibwe), and various systems for other languages of Canada. Derived scripts with identical operating principles but divergent character repertoires include Carrier and Blackfoot syllabics.
- Dham – Dhimal
- Ge'ez – Amharic, Ge’ez, Tigrigna
- Kharoṣṭhī – Gandhari, Sanskrit
- Kurukh Banna – Kurukh
- Lontara Bilang-bilang script – Buginese
- Mandombe
- Masaram Gondi – Gondi
- Meroitic script – Meroitic
- Mwangwego – Chewa and other Bantu languages of Malawi
- Pitman Shorthand
- Pollard script – Miao
- Sapalo script – Oromo
- Rma script – Qiang
- Sunuwar aka Jenticha
- Thaana – Dhivehi
- Tikamuli – Sunuwar
- Thomas Natural Shorthand

==== Final consonant-diacritic abugidas ====
In at least one abugida, not only the vowel but any syllable-final consonant is written with a diacritic. That is, if representing [o] with an under-ring, and final [k] with an over-cross, [sok] would be written as s̥̽.

- Róng – Lepcha

==== Vowel-based abugidas ====
In a few abugidas, the vowels are basic, and the consonants secondary. If no consonant is written in Pahawh Hmong, it is understood to be /k/; consonants are written after the vowel they precede in speech. In Japanese Braille, the vowels but not the consonants have independent status, and it is the vowels which are modified when the consonant is y or w.

- Boyd's Syllabic Shorthand
- Japanese Braille – Japanese
- Pahawh Hmong – Hmong

== List of writing systems by adoption ==
The following list contains writing systems that are in active use by a population of at least 0.5% of the global population.

Script name	Type	Population actively using (in millions)
Latin	Alphabet	5500 (Note: Difficult to determine, as it is used to write a very large number of languages with varying literacy rates among them.)
Chinese	Logographic	1710
Arabic	Abjad or Abugida (when diacritics are used)	1550
Devanagari	Abugida	926
Bengali-Assamese	Abugida	328
Cyrillic	Alphabet	301
Kana	Syllabary	118
Telugu	Abugida	108
Tamil	Abugida	90.9
Thai	Abugida	80
Hangul	Alphabet, featural	79.3
Gujarati	Abugida	65.6
Kannada	Abugida	54.3 (Note: Based on 46 million speakers of Kannada, Tulu, Konkani, Kodava, Badaga in a state with a 75.6 literacy rate. url=http://updateox.com/india/26-populated-cities-karnataka-population-sex-ratio-literacy)
Geʽez	Abugida	53.5
Malayalam	Abugida	45.9

== Undeciphered and possible writing systems ==
These systems have not been deciphered. In some cases, such as Meroitic, the sound values of the glyphs are known, but the texts still cannot be read because the language is not understood. Several of these systems, such as Isthmian script and Indus script, are claimed to have been deciphered, but these claims have not been confirmed by independent researchers. In many cases it is doubtful that they are actually writing. The Vinča symbols appear to be proto-writing, and quipu may have recorded only numerical information. There are doubts that the Indus script is writing, and the Phaistos Disc has so little content or context that its nature is undetermined.

- Byblos syllabary – the city of Byblos
- Indus script – Indus Valley civilization
- Isthmian script (apparently logosyllabic).
- Neolithic signs in China, including:
  - Banpo symbols – Yangshao culture (perhaps proto-writing)
  - Jiahu symbols – Peiligang culture (perhaps proto-writing)
  - Sawveh – Western Guangxi (disputed; perhaps proto-writing)
- Olmec – Olmec civilization (possibly the oldest Mesoamerican script)
- Para-Lydian script – Unknown language of Asia Minor; script appears related to the Lydian alphabet.
- Phaistos Disc (a unique text).
- Proto-Elamite – Elam (nearly as old as Sumerian).
- Quipu – Andean Civilisation (possibly numerical only, though some experts assert it may have partly been logosyllabic).
- Rongorongo – Rapa Nui (perhaps a logosyllabary)
- Trojan script – Trojan language
- Zapotec script – Zapotec (another old Mesoamerican script).

== Undeciphered manuscripts ==
Comparatively recent manuscripts and other texts written in undeciphered (and often unidentified) writing systems; some of these may represent ciphers of known languages or hoaxes.

- Voynich manuscript
- Rohonc Codex
- Hamptonese
- Dorabella cipher

== Phonetic alphabets ==
This section lists alphabets used to transcribe phonetic or phonemic sound; not to be confused with spelling alphabets like the ICAO spelling alphabet. Some of these are used for transcription purposes by linguists; others are pedagogical in nature or intended as general orthographic reforms.

- International Phonetic Alphabet
  - X-SAMPA (and original SAMPA while not covering all of IPA), is an encoding of a phonetic alphabet, i.e. IPA, using just ASCII.
- Americanist phonetic notation
- Uralic Phonetic Alphabet

== Alternative alphabets ==
- Gregg Shorthand
- Initial Teaching Alphabet
- Pitman Shorthand
- Quikscript

== Fictional writing systems ==
See List of constructed scripts for an expanded version of this table.

Name	Type	Language	Work
Aiha	Alphabet	Kesh	Always Coming Home
Ath	Alphabet	Baronh	Crest of the Stars
Aurebesh	Alphabet	Galactic Basic (i.e. English)	Star Wars
Cirth	Alphabet	Khuzdul, Sindarin, Quenya, Westron, English	The Lord of the Rings
D'ni	Alphabet	D'ni	Myst
Hymmnos	Alphabet	Hymmnos	Ar Tonelico: Melody of Elemia
KLI pIqaD	Alphabet	Klingon	Star Trek
Loxian	Abjad	Loxian	Amarantine and other projects by Enya and Roma Ryan
Mandel	Alphabet	Klingon	Star Trek
On Beyond Zebra!			
Sarati	Abugida	Quenya	The Lord of the Rings
Sitelen Pona	Logography	Toki Pona	
Tengwar	Abugida or alphabet	Quenya, Sindarin, English	The Lord of the Rings
Ultima scripts	Abjad	Various	Ultima
Unown			Pokémon
Utopian	Alphabet	Utopian	Utopia

== See also ==
- Constructed script (artificial script)
- List of creators of writing systems
- List of ISO 15924 codes
- List of languages by first written accounts
- Unicode
- Writing systems without word boundaries
