= List of constructed scripts =

This list of constructed scripts is in alphabetical order. ISO 15924 codes are provided where assigned. This list includes neither shorthand systems nor ciphers of existing scripts.

Script name	ISO 15924	Year created	Creator	Comments (click to sort by category)
Adlam	Adlm	1989	Ibrahima & Abdoulaye Barry	Proposed alphabet used to write the Fula language
Afaka	Afak	1910	Afáka Atumisi	Syllabary used to write the Ndyuka language, an English-based creole of Surinam
Aiha		1985	Ursula K. Le Guin	Alphabet of the fictional Kesh language in her novel Always Coming Home
Alternian		2009	Andrew Hussie	English based alphabet used by the trolls in the webcomic Homestuck and its related content
Ancient		2019	Inkle	Logographic script of the fictional Ancients in their game Heaven's Vault
Ariyaka		ca. 1840	Mongkut	Invented to transcribe Pali, the liturgical language of Theravada Buddhism, and inspired by the Greek and Burmese-Mon scripts
Armenian	Armn	ca. 405	Mesrop Mashtots	Alphabet thought to have been based on Greek used to write Arejso language
Ath		1996	Hiroyuki Morioka	Alphabet of the fictional Baronh language in his novel Crest of the Stars
aUI		1962	John W. Weilgart	Language and alphabet attempting to unify sound and meaning
Aurebesh		1993	Stephen Crane	Alphabet originally for Star Wars Miniatures Battles Companion based on glyphs by Joe Johnston, subsequently used for other media in the franchise
Avoiuli		1990s	Viraleo Boborenvanua	Alphabet used by the Turaga indigenous movement for some languages in Vanuatu
Bagam		ca. 1900	King Pufong	Largely lost logosyllabic script used for letters and records in the Mengaka language
Bamum	Bamu	1896–1910	Ibrahim Njoya	Syllabary for Bamum developed from what initially was a pictographic system
Bharati		2016-*	Prof. V. Srinivasa Chakravarthy and others	Alternative common script of major Indian languages (both Indo-Aryan and Dravidian) to facilitate easy communication
Blissymbol	Blis	1949	Charles K. Bliss	Conceived as a non-spoken (soundless), purely ideographic script
Bopomofo	Bopo	1913	Zhang Binglin	Semisyllabary to transcribe spoken Mandarin, Holo, &c., mainly for teaching
Braille	Brai	1821	Louis Braille	Tactile alphabet for the blind using embossed dots; dozens of derived scripts
Canadian Aboriginal syllabics	Cans	1840s	James Evans	Family of abugidas used to write a number of Aboriginal Canadian languages of the Algonquian, Inuit, and (formerly) Athabaskan language families
Caucasian Albanian	Aghb	ca. 408	Mesrop Mashtots	Alphabet used to write the now extinct Caucasian Albanian language
Cherokee	Cher	1819	Sequoyah	Syllabary inspired by Latin glyph shapes used to write the Cherokee language
Chữ Việt Trí		2012	Tôn Thất Chương	Alphabet designed for the Vietnamese language
Cirth	Cirt	1930s	J. R. R. Tolkien	Runic elven script, mainly for dwarven writing in his novel The Lord of the Rings
Clear Script		1648	Zaya Pandit	Alphabet used to write the Oirat language; based on Mongolian script
Coorgi-Cox		2005	Gregg M. Cox	A proposed abugida for the Kodava language
Cyrillic	Cyrl / Cyrs	ca. 940	Saint Cyril or his students	Alphabet mainly used to write Slavic languages; based primarily on Greek
Deseret	Dsrt	mid-19th century	University of Deseret	A phonemic alphabet designed for the English language
D'ni		1997	Richard A. Watson	Alphabet for the fictional language in the game Riven and its sequels
Duployan shorthand	Dupl	1891	Jean-Marie Le Jeune	Historically used as the main (non-shorthand) script for Chinook Jargon
Elbasan	Elba	1761	disputed	Alphabet for Albanian used to write the Elbasan Gospel Manuscript
Engsvanyáli		1940s	M. A. R. Barker	Abugida used in the Empire of the Petal Throne role-playing game
Eskayan		ca. 1920–1937	Mariano Datahan	Syllabary based on cursive Latin script for the auxiliary Eskayan language
Extensions to the IPA (extIPA)	Latn	1990–*	International Clinical; Phonetics and Linguistics Association	A set of letters and diacritics to augment the International Phonetic Alphabet for the phonetic transcription of disordered speech
Fraser	Lisu	1915	Sara Ba Thaw	Alphabet used to write the Lisu language; improved by James O. Fraser
Gargish		1990	Herman Miller	Alphabet for the fictional Gargish language in Ultima VI: The False Prophet
Glagolitic	Glag	862–863	Saints Cyril and Methodius	Historically used to write Slavic languages, before Cyrillic became dominant
Gothic	Goth	ca. 350	Ulfilas	Alphabet based primarily on Greek historically used to write the Gothic language
HamNoSys		1985	University of Hamburg	General phonetic transcription system for all sign languages
Hangul	Hang	1443	Sejong the Great	Alphabet written in syllable blocks used to write the Korean language; the oldest and most widespread featural script in use
iConji		2010	Kai Staats	Pictographic writing system for messenging
International Phonetic Alphabet (IPA)	Latn	1888–*	International Phonetic Association	Regarded as being an extension of the Latin script
Ithkuil		2004	John Quijada	Script for the constructed Ithkuil language
Jurchen	Jurc	ca. 1119	Wanyan Xiyin	Largely undeciphered logographic script with phonetic elements for Jurchen
Kēlen		1980	Sylvia Sotomayor	Alphabet for a fictional alien language without verbs
Khitan large script	Kitl	920	by order of Abaoji	Largely undeciphered logographic script for the Khitan language
Khitan small script	Kits	ca. 924	Yelü Diela	Partially deciphered logographic script with phonetic elements for Khitan
Khom		1924	Ong Kommandam	Semi-syllabary used for secret communication among dissidents in French Laos
Kikakui	Mend	ca. 1917	Mohammed Turay	Syllabary used to write the Mende language of Sierra Leone
KLI pIqaD	Piqd	ca. 1990	anonymous	Glyphs created for Star Trek: The Next Generation, later sent as a font to the KLI
Limbu	Limb	ca. 1740	Te-ongsi Sirijunga Xin Thebe	Abugida derived from Tibetan to write the Limbu language
Lisu syllabary		1924–1930	Ngua-ze-bo	Syllabary of about 800 characters used to write the Lisu language
Manchu		1599; 1632	Nurhaci; Dahai	Alphabet based on Mongolian script to write the nearly extinct Manchu language
Mandombe		1978	Wabeladio Payi	Alphabet written in syllable blocks for Kikongo, Lingala, Ciluba and Kiswahili
Miꞌkmaw hieroglyphic writing		after 1675	Chrestien Le Clercq	Logographic script used historically for the Miꞌkmaq language
Neomeroitic		2022-2023	Amundé Musango	Proposed alphabet to write the Swahili language and other African languages using a non-indigenous script
Night writing		1808	Charles Barbier	Forerunner of Braille; tactile alphabet intended for communication in total darkness
N'Ko	Nkoo	1949	Solomana Kante	Alphabet used to write the Manding languages, including a kind of koine
Ol Chiki	Olck	1925	Raghunath Murmu	Official alphabet for the Santali language
Old Permic	Perm	1372	Stephen of Perm	Alphabet mainly based on Cyrillic and Greek once used to write mediaeval Komi
Phags-pa	Phag	1269	Drogön Chögyal Phagpa	Used historically for the languages in the Yuan sector of the Mongolian Empire
Pollard	Plrd	1936	Sam Pollard	Abugida based on Cree used to write several minority languages in China
Quikscript		1966	Ronald Kingsley Read	Phonemic alphabet designed to write the English language quickly and compactly
Real Character		1668	John Wilkins	Pasigraphy used to write Wilkins' proposed Universal language
Sarati	Sara	1910s	J. R. R. Tolkien	Precursor of his elven Tengwar script
Shavian	Shaw	ca. 1960	Ronald Kingsley Read	Phonemic alphabet to write the English language; precursor to Quikscript
Sheikah		2017	Nintendo	Fictional alphabet based on English used in the videogame saga The Legend of Zelda
SignWriting	Sgnw	1974	Valerie Sutton	Proposed phonemic system of writing sign languages
Sitelen Pona		2014	Sonja Lang	Logographic writing system used in Toki Pona
Sitelen Sitelen		ca. 2006	Jonathan Gabel	Non-linear writing system with both logographic and alphasyllabic characters, used in Toki Pona. Also known as Sitelen Suwi.
Soyombo	Soyo	1686	Zanabazar	Abugida historically used to write the Mongolian language
Stokoe notation		1960	William Stokoe	Proposed featural system of writing sign languages
Tangut	Tang	1036	Yeli Renrong	Logographic script historically used to write the extinct Tangut language
Tengwar	Teng	1930s	J. R. R. Tolkien	Elven script used for various languages in his novel The Lord of the Rings
Testerian		1529	Jacobo de Testera	Pictorial writing system used until the 19th century to teach Christian doctrine to the indigenous peoples of Mexico
Thai	Thai	1283	Ram Khamhaeng	Abugida used to write Thai, Southern Thai and many others
Tibetan	Tibt	ca. 650	Thonmi Sambhota	Abugida probably based on Gupta, a Brahmic script, for writing Tibetan
Unifon		mid-1950s	John R. Malone	Phonemic alphabet to write the English language, based on the Latin alphabet
Unker Non-Linear Writing System		2010-*	Alex Fink & Sai	Complex script written and read in a nonlinear format
Universal Alphabet		1585	Thomas Harriot	Phonetic alphabet used to transcribe the extinct Carolina Algonquian language
Vai	Vaii	ca. 1832	Momolu Duwalu Bukele	Syllabary used to write the Vai language
Visible Speech	Visp	1867	Alexander Melville Bell	System of phonetic symbols to represent the position of the speech organs
Voynichese		ca. 1400-1430	anonymous	Undeciphered script used to write the Voynich manuscript in the early fifteenth century
Warang	Wara	ca. 1950	Lako Bodra	Abugida, but with alphabet-like full vowel symbols, to write the Ho language
Yugtun		ca. 1900	Uyaquq	Syllabary historically used to write the Central Alaskan Yup'ik language
Zanabazar square	Zanb	pre-1686	Zanabazar	Abugida based on a Brahmic script developed to write the Mongolian language

* Script in ongoing development.

== See also ==
- Constructed script
- List of writing systems
- ConScript Unicode Registry
