= Portuguese manual alphabet =

Manual alphabet in Portuguese Sign Language

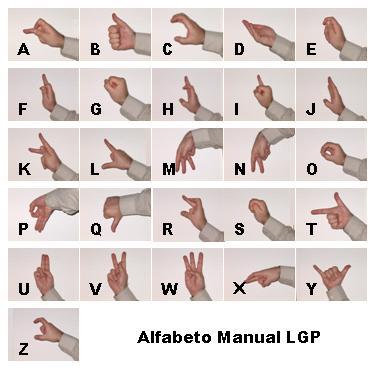
The LGP alphabet. The orientations of the letters differ in some cases from the gallery below.

The Portuguese manual alphabet is the manual alphabet used in Portuguese Sign Language (LGP) (Portuguese: Língua gestual portuguesa). It is distinct from the manual alphabets of nearby sign languages due to LGP's Swedish origins.

Letters

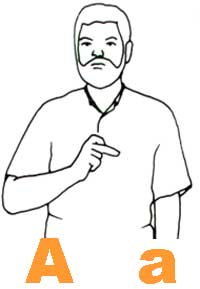
A

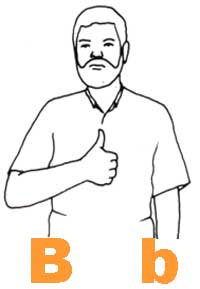
B

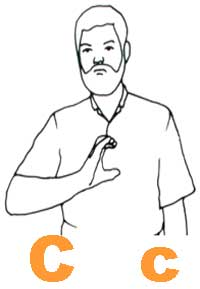
C

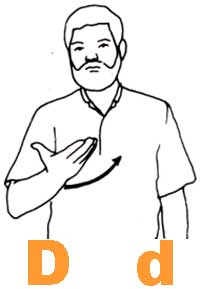
D

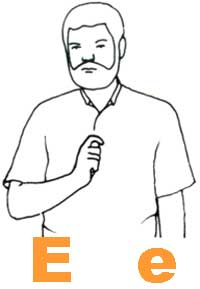
E

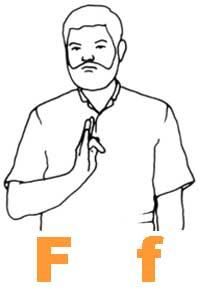
F

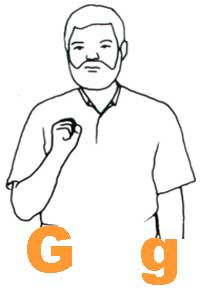
G

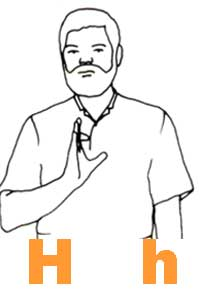
H

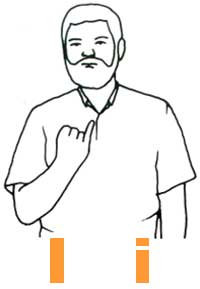
I

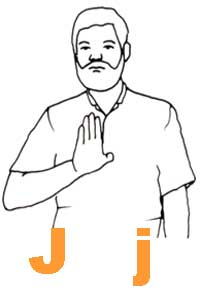
J

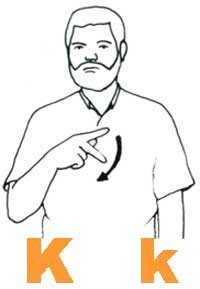
K

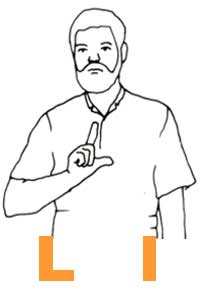
L

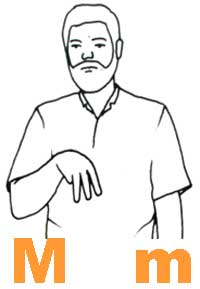
M

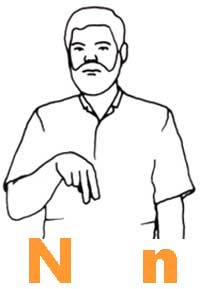
N

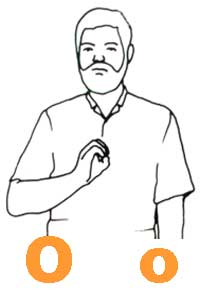
O

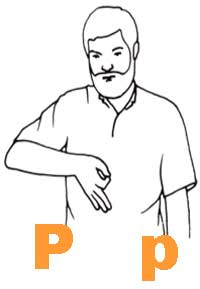
P

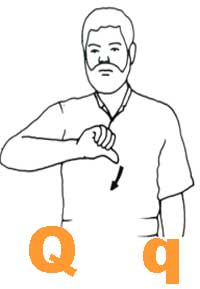
Q

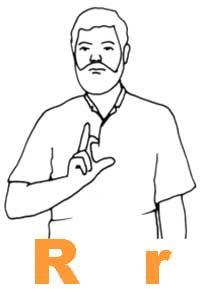
R

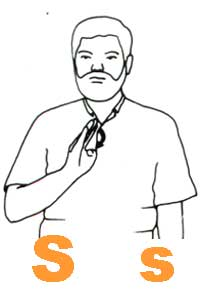
S

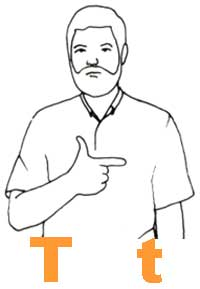
T

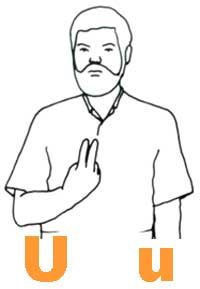
U

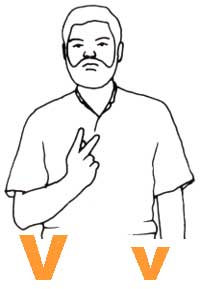
V

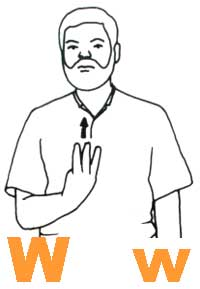
W

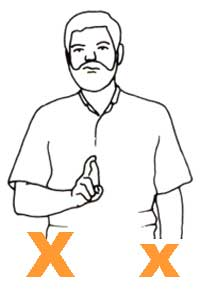
X

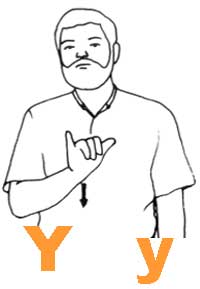
Y

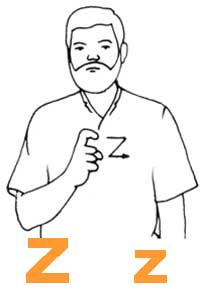
Z

== See also ==
- Fingerspelling
- Portuguese Sign Language
