= Ariyaka script =

Invented alphabet to transcribe Pali

Ariyaka
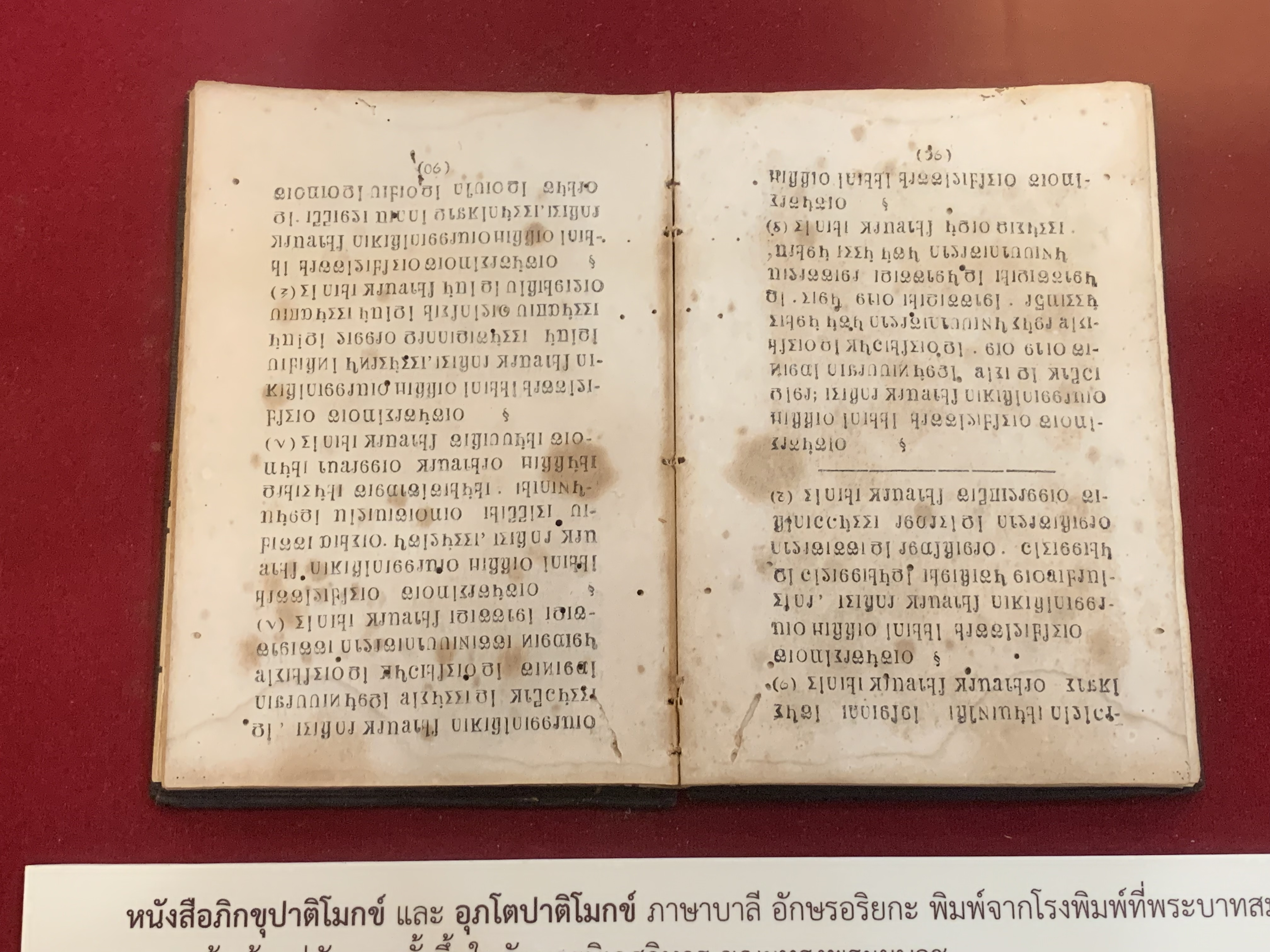
- Bhikkhu Patimokkha in Latin-derived Ariyaka script invented by King Mongkut c. 1841 to write Buddhist texts.
- Script type: Alphabet
- Period: c. 1800s
- Direction: Left-to-right
- Region: Thailand
- Languages: Pali, Lao, Isan, and others

Related scripts
- Parent systems: Greek: Latin alphabet; Ariyaka

The Ariyaka script (Thai: อักษรอริยกะ) is an obsolete alphabet, invented by King Mongkut as an alternative to transcribing Pali, the liturgical language of Theravada Buddhism. The script, inspired by the Greek and Burmese-Mon scripts, did not come into popular use and eventually fell out of usage.

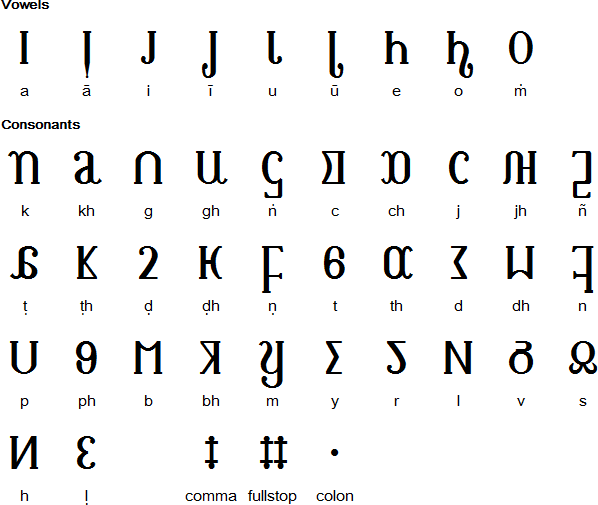
This is a template of the Ariyaka script created by King Rama IV of Siam in 1833 for use with the Pali language.

== History ==
Pali, an early-period language, has been traditionally used to preserve cultural heritage and religious teachings. The Ariyaka alphabet was invented by King Mongkut (Rama IV) of Siam (1804–1868) as an alternative script for Pali. Mongkut found the Khom Thai script, which was commonly used for Pali, to be too complex and sought to create a more accessible and Western-style script.

During mid-19th century religious reforms in the Rattanakosin Kingdom (1782–1932), Mongkut discouraged the use of Khom Thai in religious texts, arguing that its exclusivity falsely implied divine or magical significance. Instead, he ordered Buddhist monks to adopt the Thai script for recording the Tripiṭaka. In the 1830s and 40s, he introduced the Ariyaka script to facilitate printing rather than relying on traditional palm-leaf manuscripts.

Mongkut established a printing press for the script at Bowonniwet Vihara Temple in Bangkok, where a limited number of texts were printed. The Ariyaka script, inspired by Greek and Mon-Burmese scripts, was designed to replace existing Pali transcription scripts such as Khom Thai and Tai Tham.

The Pali alphabet, including the Ariyaka script, consists of 41 letters:

- 6 vowels
- 2 diphthongs
- 32 consonants
- 1 accessory nasal sound (niggahīta)

Consonants are further classified into 25 mutes, 6 semivowels, 1 sibilant, and 1 aspirant, with vowels divided into long and short forms.

In modern times, computational research has been conducted on Ariyaka script recognition. A study by Neha Gautam (2015) proposed a PALI Alphabet Recognition System, which utilizes image processing techniques to digitize and identify Ariyaka characters for textual analysis.
