= Bagam script =

Partially deciphered writing system

Bagam Eghap
- Script type: Logosyllabic
- Period: ca. 1900
- Direction: Left-to-right
- Languages: Məgaka

Related scripts
- Parent systems: Bamum?: Bagam

The Bagam or Eghap script is a partially deciphered Cameroonian script of several hundred characters. It was invented by King Pufong of the Bagam (Eghap) people, c. 1900, and used for letters and records, though it was never in wide use. It is reputedly based on the Bamum script, though the numerals show more resemblance to Bamum than the syllabograms do, and it does not appear to be a direct descendant. The only attested example is a paper by Louis Malcolm, a British officer who served in Cameroon in World War I. This was published without the characters in 1921, and the manuscript with characters was deposited in the library of Cambridge University. This was published in full in Tuchscherer (1999).

A hundred characters are recorded, though it is thought the script had several hundred more. These include logograms, some used phonetically, syllabograms (for CV and CVC syllables), as well as independent consonants and vowels.
