= Coldwater, British Columbia =

Indian reserve community in British Columbia, Canada

Coordinates: 50°02′00″N 120°50′00″W

Coldwater is an Indian reserve community on the Coldwater River in the Nicola Country region of the British Columbia Interior in the Canadian province of British Columbia, located six miles southwest of the City of Merritt. It is the main reserve of the Coldwater First Nation, the government of the local group of Nlaka'pamux people and was the site of the Coldwater Mission, one of the first Catholic missions in the Interior of the province. It was at Coldwater that the Duployan shorthand used in the Kamloops Wawa periodical published by the Kamloops diocese was first learned and taught.

== See also ==
- List of Indian reserves in British Columbia
- List of communities in British Columbia
