= Jean-Marie-Raphaël Le Jeune =

French-Canadian Catholic priest

The Reverend Father Jean-Marie-Raphaël Le Jeune
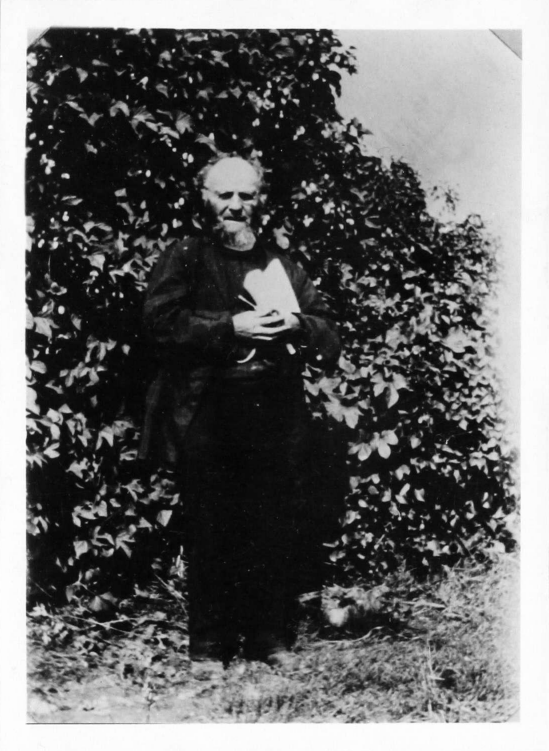
- Father J.M.R. Le Jeune, c. 1925
- Church: Catholic Church
- Diocese: Kamloops

Orders
- Ordination: June 7, 1879 by Pierre-Paul Durieu

Personal details
- Born: Jean-Marie Le Jeune; April 12, 1855 Pleyber-Christ, France
- Died: November 21, 1930 (aged 75) New Westminster, British Columbia, Canada
- Buried: The Oblates of Mary Immaculate Cemetery, Mission, British Columbia, Canada
- Denomination: Catholicism

Jean-Marie-Raphaël Le Jeune (born Jean-Marie; 12 April 1855 – 21 November 1930) was a French Canadian Roman Catholic priest, Oblate of Mary Immaculate, missionary, linguist, author, and newspaper publisher.

== Early life and ordination ==
Born in Pleyber-Christ in Brittany in northwestern France, Le Jeune was educated in his village and in the neighbouring town of Saint-Pol-de-Léon. At the age of eighteen he began his theological studies at Autun in Burgundy, where he was ordained on 7 June 1879. Soon after, he volunteered for missionary service, and was assigned to the Indian missions of British Columbia.

== Training in Chinook Jargon and missionary work at Fraser Canyon ==
Le Jeune and another young missionary, Father Eugène-Casimir Chirouse, travelled to North America in the company of Bishop Paul Durieu, who on the voyage across the Atlantic instructed them in the basic vocabulary of Chinook Jargon, a pidgin trade language in use in the Pacific Northwest composed of Chinookan, Nootkan, French, and English. After crossing the continent by train and travelling by steamer from San Francisco, the party arrived in New Westminster in October 1879, where Le Jeune spent the winter. The following June he was sent to the Fraser Canyon area to begin his missionary work among the Indians and minister to the Catholics who were among the thousands of workmen then employed in the construction of the Canadian Pacific Railway. While there, Le Jeune began his study of the Thompson language.

== Assignments at an Indian Residential School and in Indian Reserves ==
In the fall of 1880, Le Jeune was sent to St. Mary's Mission, which had been established by the Oblates in 1861 as the centre for missionary activity among the Indians of the Lower Fraser Valley, where he spent the next two years.

In 1882, Le Jeune was assigned to St. Louis Mission in Kamloops, and traveled throughout the region proselytizing to the native communities. In 1891 he became rector of St. Joseph's Church on the Kamloops Indian Reserve, and in 1893 succeeded Father Jean-Marie J. Le Jacq as superior of St. Louis Mission, a post he held until 1929.

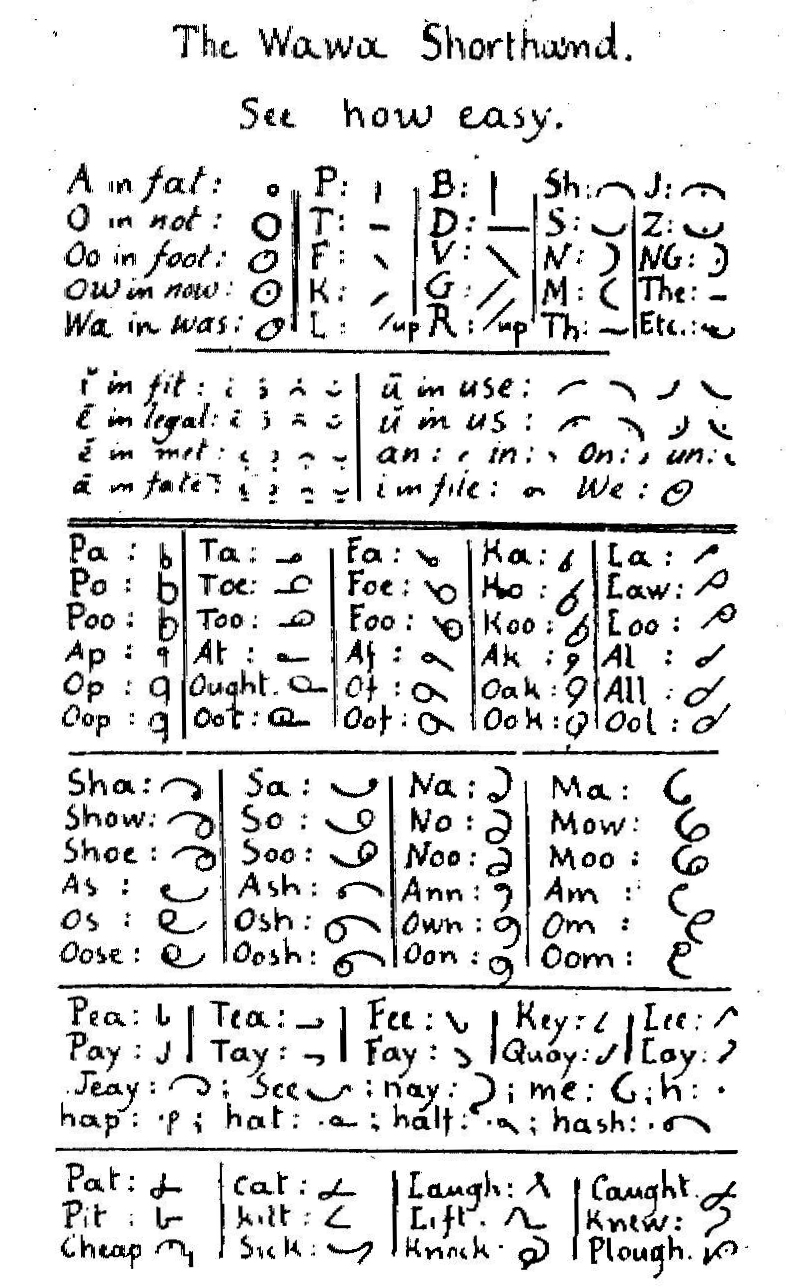
Le Jeune's shorthand system

== Shorthand writing for Chinook Jargon and linguistic works ==
Le Jeune spoke several native languages, and in 1890 adapted Duployan shorthand to Chinook Jargon. The system was widely adopted among the native community and in 1891 Le Jeune launched a newspaper written in English and Chinook Jargon called the Kamloops Wawa. Both the Wawa and Le Jeune's Indian pupils received international recognition at shorthand competitions and exhibitions in France. At the exhibition at Montlhéry in May, 1896, Le Jeune was awarded a gold medal as editor of the WaWa, and entries from two of his Indian pupils were awarded bronze. Further awards were received at the exposition at Nancy in October of that year, while at the Shorthand Exposition and Concours held at Roubaix from January to May 1897, the Wawa won another gold medal and fifty diplomas were awarded to the highest-ranking of the entries submitted by 150 Indians from the Kamloops, Shuswap, and surrounding areas.

Le Jeune also wrote a number of pamphlets about native languages such as Practical Chinook vocabulary (1886), Prayers in the Okanagan language (1893), Polyglott manual of prayers (1896, contributor), and Chinook rudiments (1924).

== Travels in Europe and meeting with Pope Pius X ==
In 1904 Le Jeune returned to Europe for the first time in 25 years to attend an Oblate chapter meeting at Liege. He was accompanied on the trip by Chiefs Louis Clexliqen of Kamloops and John Chiliheetza of Douglas Lake. After landing at Liverpool, Le Jeune and the two chiefs travelled to London, to Le Jeune's home in Brittany, to the Oblate chapter meeting at Liege, where they spent three weeks, and to pilgrimage sites on the continent. The trip ended in Rome where they were received by Pope Pius X in a group audience of some 50 persons. Detailed accounts of the journey were published in the December 1904 issue of the Kamloops WaWa and in the Kamloops Standard of 12 November 1904. The latter report noted that the party had brought back 2000 medals blessed by the Pope for distribution to the Indians, as well as 150 stereopticon views which Le Jeune had exhibited to a large crowd at the hall on the Kamloops Reserve.

== Death and burial ==
Le Jeune died November 21, 1930, at New Westminster and is buried in the Oblate cemetery at Mission. Lac Le Jeune, near Logan Lake, bears his name.
