= Duployan (Unicode block) =

- Range: U+1BC00..U+1BC9F (160 code points)
- Plane: SMP
- Scripts: Duployan
- Major alphabets: Duployéan, Chinook, Romanian shorthand, Sloan-Duployan, Pernin, Perrault
- Assigned: 143 code points
- Unused: 17 reserved code points

Unicode version history
- 7.0 (2014): 143 (+143)

Unicode documentation
- Code chart ∣ Web page

Duployan is a Unicode block containing characters for various Duployan shorthands, including French Duployéan, Chinook Writing, Romanian shorthand, and the English Sloan-Duployan, Pernin, and Perrault shorthands. It is the first block of shorthand characters included in the Unicode Standard.

== Block ==
Duployan^{[1]}^{[2]} Official Unicode Consortium code chart (PDF)
	0	1	2	3	4	5	6	7	8	9	A	B	C	D	E	F
U+1BC0x	𛰀	𛰁	𛰂	𛰃	𛰄	𛰅	𛰆	𛰇	𛰈	𛰉	𛰊	𛰋	𛰌	𛰍	𛰎	𛰏
U+1BC1x	𛰐	𛰑	𛰒	𛰓	𛰔	𛰕	𛰖	𛰗	𛰘	𛰙	𛰚	𛰛	𛰜	𛰝	𛰞	𛰟
U+1BC2x	𛰠	𛰡	𛰢	𛰣	𛰤	𛰥	𛰦	𛰧	𛰨	𛰩	𛰪	𛰫	𛰬	𛰭	𛰮	𛰯
U+1BC3x	𛰰	𛰱	𛰲	𛰳	𛰴	𛰵	𛰶	𛰷	𛰸	𛰹	𛰺	𛰻	𛰼	𛰽	𛰾	𛰿
U+1BC4x	𛱀	𛱁	𛱂	𛱃	𛱄	𛱅	𛱆	𛱇	𛱈	𛱉	𛱊	𛱋	𛱌	𛱍	𛱎	𛱏
U+1BC5x	𛱐	𛱑	𛱒	𛱓	𛱔	𛱕	𛱖	𛱗	𛱘	𛱙	𛱚	𛱛	𛱜	𛱝	𛱞	𛱟
U+1BC6x	𛱠	𛱡	𛱢	𛱣	𛱤	𛱥	𛱦	𛱧	𛱨	𛱩	𛱪					
U+1BC7x	𛱰	𛱱	𛱲	𛱳	𛱴	𛱵	𛱶	𛱷	𛱸	𛱹	𛱺	𛱻	𛱼			
U+1BC8x	𛲀	𛲁	𛲂	𛲃	𛲄	𛲅	𛲆	𛲇	𛲈							
U+1BC9x	𛲐	𛲑	𛲒	𛲓	𛲔	𛲕	𛲖	𛲗	𛲘	𛲙			𛲜	D T L S	𛲞	𛲟
Notes: 1. As of Unicode version 16.0; 2. Grey areas indicate non-assigned code points

== History ==
The following Unicode-related documents record the purpose and process of defining specific characters in the Duployan block:

Version	Final code points (Note: Proposed code points and characters names may differ from final code points and names)	Count	L2 ID	WG2 ID	Document
7.0	U+1BC00..1BC6A, 1BC70..1BC7C, 1BC80..1BC88, 1BC90..1BC99, 1BC9C..1BC9F	143	L2/09-184		Anderson, Van (2009-05-03), Proposal to include Chinook Pipa script in UCS
7.0	U+1BC00..1BC6A, 1BC70..1BC7C, 1BC80..1BC88, 1BC90..1BC99, 1BC9C..1BC9F	143	L2/09-184.1		Anderson, Van (2009-05-03), Proposal to include Chinook Pipa script in UCS [zip format of the HTML version]
7.0	U+1BC00..1BC6A, 1BC70..1BC7C, 1BC80..1BC88, 1BC90..1BC99, 1BC9C..1BC9F	143	L2/09-283		Anderson, Van (2009-07-24), Proposal to include Chinook Pipa script in UCS
7.0	U+1BC00..1BC6A, 1BC70..1BC7C, 1BC80..1BC88, 1BC90..1BC99, 1BC9C..1BC9F	143	L2/09-364		Anderson, Van (2009-10-06), Proposal to Include Duployan Shorthands and Chinook Script in UCS
7.0	U+1BC00..1BC6A, 1BC70..1BC7C, 1BC80..1BC88, 1BC90..1BC99, 1BC9C..1BC9F	143	L2/09-364.1		Anderson, Van (2009-10-06), Proposal to Include Duployan Shorthands and Chinook Script in UCS [zip format of the HTML version]
7.0	U+1BC00..1BC6A, 1BC70..1BC7C, 1BC80..1BC88, 1BC90..1BC99, 1BC9C..1BC9F	143	L2/09-364.2		Anderson, Van (2009-10-26), Proposal to Include Duployan Shorthands and Chinook Script in UCS [fonts and data]
7.0	U+1BC00..1BC6A, 1BC70..1BC7C, 1BC80..1BC88, 1BC90..1BC99, 1BC9C..1BC9F	143	L2/10-027		Anderson, Van (2010-01-25), Duployan Charts
7.0	U+1BC00..1BC6A, 1BC70..1BC7C, 1BC80..1BC88, 1BC90..1BC99, 1BC9C..1BC9F	143	L2/10-028		Anderson, Van (2010-01-25), Duployan Documentation
7.0	U+1BC00..1BC6A, 1BC70..1BC7C, 1BC80..1BC88, 1BC90..1BC99, 1BC9C..1BC9F	143	L2/10-026		Anderson, Van (2010-01-31), Proposal to include Duployan Shorthands and Chinook script in UCS
7.0	U+1BC00..1BC6A, 1BC70..1BC7C, 1BC80..1BC88, 1BC90..1BC99, 1BC9C..1BC9F	143	L2/10-159		Anderson, Van (2010-05-03), Proposal to include Duployan Shorthands and Chinook script in UCS
7.0	U+1BC00..1BC6A, 1BC70..1BC7C, 1BC80..1BC88, 1BC90..1BC99, 1BC9C..1BC9F	143	L2/10-201		Anderson, Van (2010-05-12), Guide to Duployan Shorthands and Stenographies
7.0	U+1BC00..1BC6A, 1BC70..1BC7C, 1BC80..1BC88, 1BC90..1BC99, 1BC9C..1BC9F	143	L2/10-202		Anderson, Van (2010-05-12), Duployan Texts
7.0	U+1BC00..1BC6A, 1BC70..1BC7C, 1BC80..1BC88, 1BC90..1BC99, 1BC9C..1BC9F	143	L2/10-272R2	N3895	Anderson, Van (2010-08-12), Proposal to include Duployan Shorthands and Chinook script and Shorthand Format Controls in UCS
7.0	U+1BC00..1BC6A, 1BC70..1BC7C, 1BC80..1BC88, 1BC90..1BC99, 1BC9C..1BC9F	143	L2/10-221		Moore, Lisa (2010-08-23), "C.21", UTC #124 / L2 #221 Minutes
7.0	U+1BC00..1BC6A, 1BC70..1BC7C, 1BC80..1BC88, 1BC90..1BC99, 1BC9C..1BC9F	143	L2/10-347	N3908	Everson, Michael (2010-09-21), On ordering and the proposed Duployan script for shorthands and Chinook
7.0	U+1BC00..1BC6A, 1BC70..1BC7C, 1BC80..1BC88, 1BC90..1BC99, 1BC9C..1BC9F	143	L2/10-352	N3922	Anderson, Van (2010-09-21), Response to Irish NB comments N3908
7.0	U+1BC00..1BC6A, 1BC70..1BC7C, 1BC80..1BC88, 1BC90..1BC99, 1BC9C..1BC9F	143	L2/10-364	N3931	Everson, Michael (2010-10-03), Further discussion on ordering and the proposed Duployan script
7.0	U+1BC00..1BC6A, 1BC70..1BC7C, 1BC80..1BC88, 1BC90..1BC99, 1BC9C..1BC9F	143	L2/10-383	N3940	Anderson, Van (2010-10-05), Quick response to Irish NB comments N3931
7.0	U+1BC00..1BC6A, 1BC70..1BC7C, 1BC80..1BC88, 1BC90..1BC99, 1BC9C..1BC9F	143	L2/11-215	N4088	Anderson, Van; Everson, Michael (2011-05-30), Resolving chart and collation order for the Duployan script
7.0	U+1BC00..1BC6A, 1BC70..1BC7C, 1BC80..1BC88, 1BC90..1BC99, 1BC9C..1BC9F	143	L2/11-303		Anderson, Van (2011-07-19), Proposal to include Duployan Shorthands and Chinook script and Shorthand Format Controls in UCS, as approved by WG2
7.0	U+1BC00..1BC6A, 1BC70..1BC7C, 1BC80..1BC88, 1BC90..1BC99, 1BC9C..1BC9F	143	L2/11-261R2		Moore, Lisa (2011-08-16), "Consensus 128-C31", UTC #128 / L2 #225 Minutes, "Reconfirm the approval of the 143 Duployan shorthand characters in the Duployan block (U+1BC00..U+1BC9F), with the revised ordering as documented in L2/11-215"
7.0	U+1BC00..1BC6A, 1BC70..1BC7C, 1BC80..1BC88, 1BC90..1BC99, 1BC9C..1BC9F	143		N4103	"11.1.5 Duployan Shorthands and Chinook script and Shorthand Format Controls in UCS", Unconfirmed minutes of WG 2 meeting 58, 2012-01-03
7.0	U+1BC00..1BC6A, 1BC70..1BC7C, 1BC80..1BC88, 1BC90..1BC99, 1BC9C..1BC9F	143	L2/12-329		Anderson, Van (2012-10-15), Duployan Letter Kk representative glyph change
7.0	U+1BC00..1BC6A, 1BC70..1BC7C, 1BC80..1BC88, 1BC90..1BC99, 1BC9C..1BC9F	143	L2/12-343R2		Moore, Lisa (2012-12-04), "C.8", UTC #133 Minutes

== See also ==
- Shorthand Format Controls
