= Chinook Jargon =

Pidgin trade language from the Pacific Northwest

- chinuk wawa, chinook 𛰣𛱇‌𛰚𛱛𛰅 𛱜‌𛱜
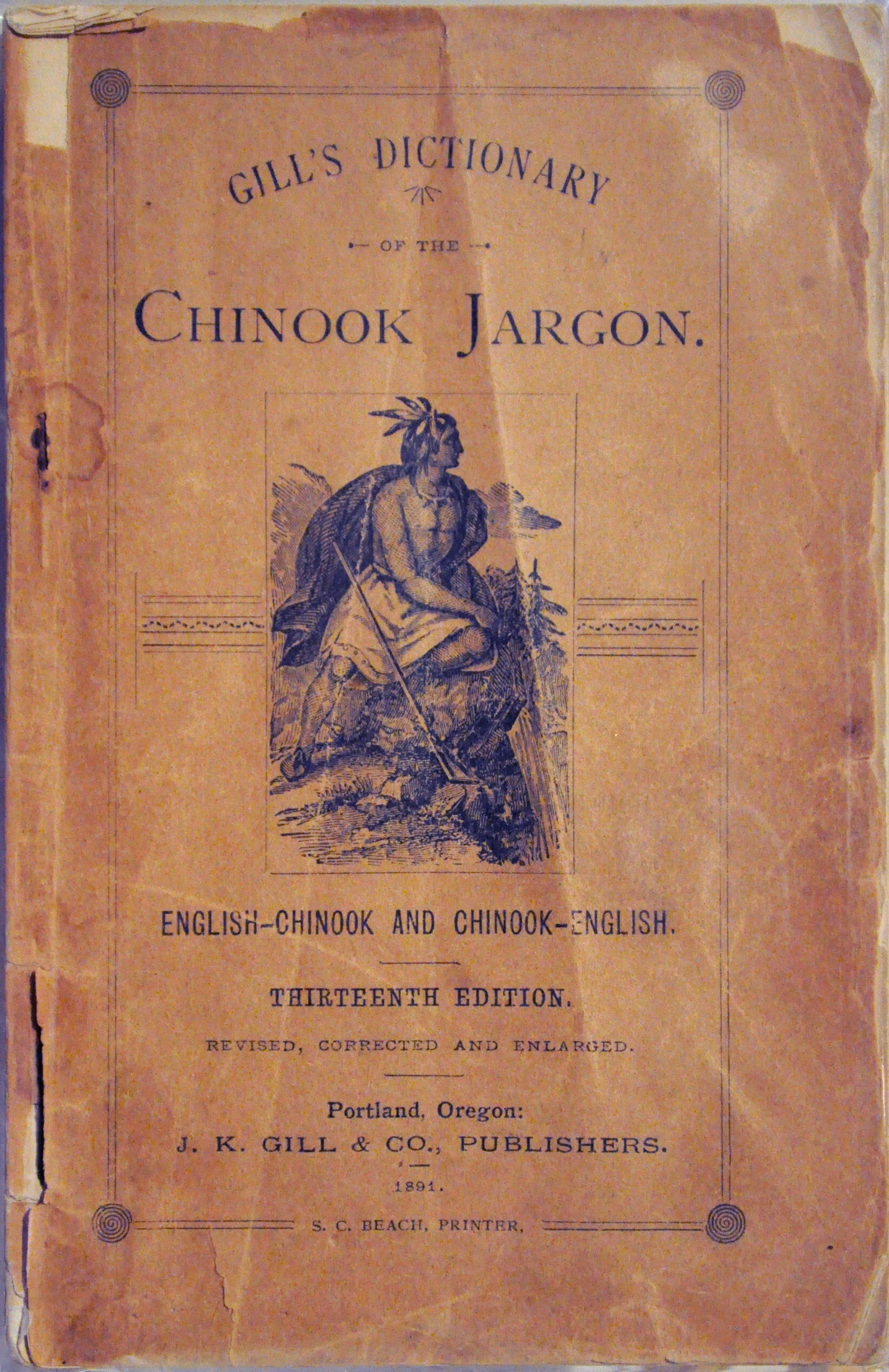
- Cover, Gill's Dictionary of the Chinook Jargon, 13th Edition, 1891. Photographed at Log House Museum, Seattle, Washington.
- Native to: Canada, United States
- Region: Pacific Northwest (Interior and Coast): Alaska, Yukon, British Columbia, Washington State, Oregon, Idaho, Montana, Northern California
- Native speakers: 1 (2013)
- Language family: Mainly Wakashan (Nootka Jargon), Chinookan, Salishan, and Indo-European (Germanic and Romance)
- Writing system: De facto Latin, historically Duployan; currently standardized IPA-based orthography

Official status
- Official language in: De facto in Pacific Northwest until about 1920

Language codes
- ISO 639-2: chn
- ISO 639-3: chn
- Glottolog: pidg1254 (pidgin) chin1272 (creole)
- ELP: Chinook Wawa
- Chinook Jargon is classified as Critically Endangered by the UNESCO Atlas of the World's Languages in Danger.

Chinook Jargon (Chinuk Wawa or Chinook Wawa, also known simply as Chinook or Jargon) is a language originating as a pidgin trade language in the Pacific Northwest. It spread during the 19th century from the lower Columbia River, first to other areas in modern Oregon and Washington, then to British Columbia and parts of Alaska, Northern California, Idaho and Montana. It sometimes took on the characteristics of a creole language. The contact language Chinook Jargon should not be confused with Chinookan languages.

Reflecting its origins in early trade transactions, approximately 15 percent of its lexicon derived from French. The Jargon also acquired English derived words, and it has a written form in Duployan shorthand. The written form is commonly called "Chinuk Pipa" in the language itself.

Many words from Chinook Jargon remain in common use in the Western United States and British Columbia. It has been described as part of a multicultural heritage shared by the modern inhabitants of the Pacific Northwest. The total number of Jargon words in published lexicons is in the hundreds. It has a simple grammatical system. In Chinook Jargon, the consonant /r/ is rare. Such English and French words as rice and merci, for instance, have changed after being adopted to the Jargon, to lays and mahsi, respectively.

== Name ==
Most books written in English still use the term Chinook Jargon, but some linguists working with the preservation of a creolized form of the language used in Grand Ronde, Oregon, prefer the term Chinuk Wawa (with the spelling 'Chinuk' instead of 'Chinook'). Historical speakers did not use the name Chinook Wawa, but rather "Chinook" or "Chinuk".

== History ==
=== Origins ===
Whether Jargon was a post-contact or pre-contact language has been the subject of debate among scholars.

The pre-contact hypothesis claims that the language developed prior to European settlement as an intra-Indigenous contact language in a region marked by divisive geography and intense linguistic diversity, and that only later on in its evolution did it gain European derived words. There is some evidence for a Chinookan-Nuu-chah-nulth lingua franca in the writings of John Jewitt and in what is known as the Barclay Sound word-list, from the area of Ucluelet and Alberni.

Some scholars believe that an existing trade language began "morphing" into the more familiar Chinook Jargon in the late 1790s, notably at a dinner party at Nootka Sound where Capts Vancouver and Bodega y Quadra were entertained by Chief Maquinna and his brother Callicum performing a theatrical using mock English and mock Spanish words and mimicry of European dress and mannerisms. There evidently was Jargon in use in Queen Charlotte, but this "Haida Jargon" is not known to have shared anything in common with Chinook Jargon or with the Nootkan-Chinookan "proto-jargon", which is its main foundation.

The post-contact hypothesis claims the language originated in Nootka Sound after the arrival of Russian and Spanish traders as a means of communicating between them and Indigenous peoples. It eventually spread further south due to commercial use. University of Ottawa linguist George Lang has argued for this conclusion.

Linguist Barbara Harris suggests a dual genesis, positing that both origins probably have some legitimacy and that the two varieties eventually blended together.

In 2016, linguist John Lyon studied the word lists collected by Francis Drake and his crew on the 1579 voyage that took them to the Oregon coast. Lyon compared the seven words and phrases found on the Native vocabulary list recorded by Drake and his men with the vocabularies of Native languages on the west coast (Lyon 2016).

Of the five single words on the list, Lyon found that the word petáh, which was the Native word for a root that can be eaten raw or made into cakes called cheepe, were meaning matches for the Jargon words 'wapato' (a root that tastes like a potato) and 'chaplill', the word for the bread cakes made from this root (Lyon 2016:41). The word recorded for 'king' by Drake was 'hióh' (recorded also as 'hioghe'). Lyon thought it was a match for the Wawa word hi-yú, meaning a gathering, or much, plenty. Lyon was not able to conclude whether Drake encountered people of the Northwest Coast.

In 2021, Melissa Darby studied the ethnographic records and the records left by Francis Drake's expedition. She found new evidence that the people Drake met were speaking some Jargon words to Drake and his men.

=== Use ===
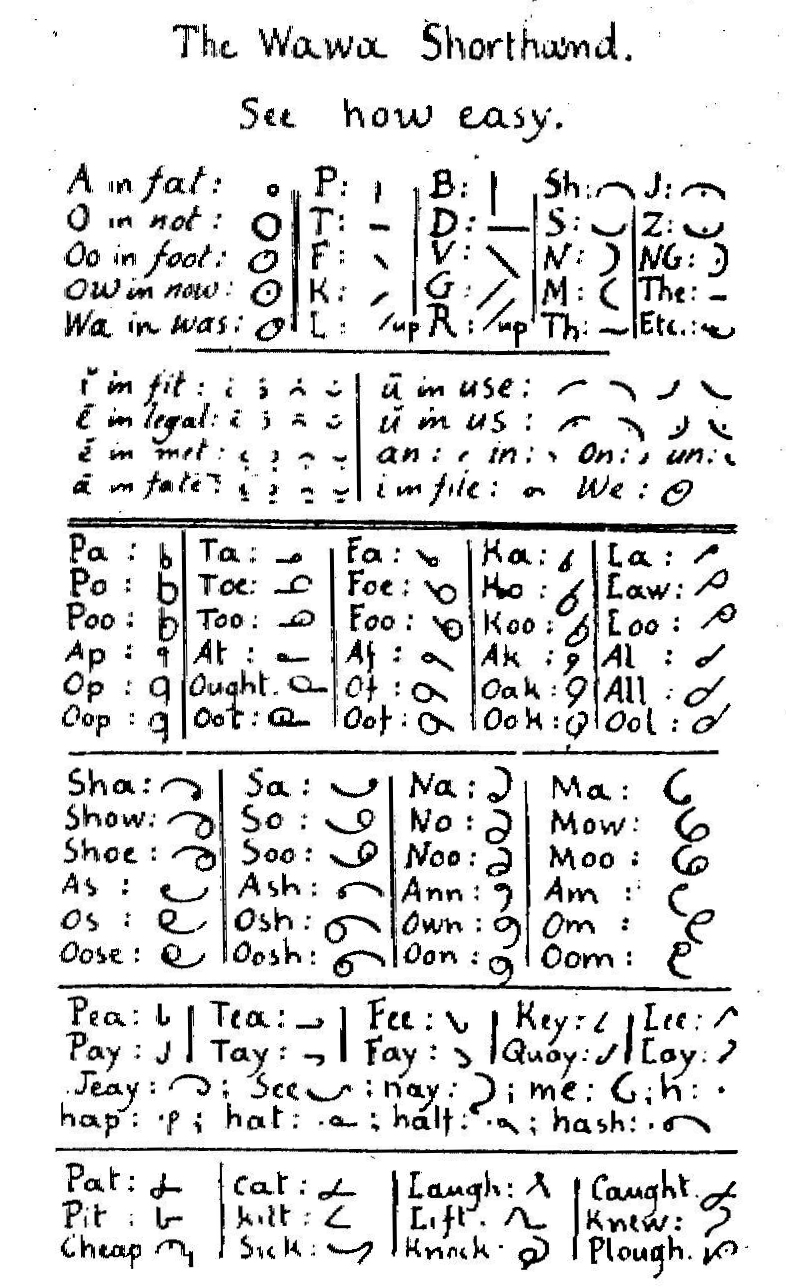
An example of the shorthand "Chinuk Pipa" writing system used in the Kamloops Wawa newspaper

In the Diocese of Kamloops, British Columbia, hundreds of speakers learned to read and write the Jargon using Duployan shorthand via the publication Kamloops Wawa. As a result, the Jargon had the beginnings of its own literature, mostly translated scripture and classical works, some local and episcopal news, community gossip and events, and diaries. Marah Ellis Ryan (c. 1860–1934), an early Native American activist and novelist, used Chinook words and phrases in her writing.

In Oregon, Chinook Jargon was widely used by natives, trappers, traders, employees of the Hudson's Bay Company, missionaries, and pioneers who came across the Oregon Trail from the 1830s to the 1870s. In Portland's first half century (1840s–1890s), there were frequent trade interactions between pioneers and Indigenous peoples. Many Oregonians used Jargon in casual conversation. By 1840, Chinook Jargon had creolized into a native language for some speakers.Jones estimates that in pioneer times in the 1860s there were about 100,000 speakers of Chinook Jargon. It peaked in usage from approximately 1858 to 1900, and declined as a result of widespread deaths from the Spanish flu and World War I, and the Canadian Residential School System.

As late as the 1940s, Indigenous children were born in Tiller, Oregon, who grew up speaking Chinook Jargon as their first language. But by 1962, the Summer Institute of Linguistics (SIL) estimated that only 100 speakers were left.

According to Nard Jones, Chinook Jargon was still in use in Seattle until roughly the eve of World War II, especially among the members of the Arctic Club. Seattle was the last city where the language was widely used. Writing in 1972, Jones remarked that "Only a few can speak it fully, men of ninety or a hundred years old, like Henry Broderick, the realtor, and Joshua Green, the banker."

In the 2000s, Lane Community College in Eugene, Oregon, started a three-semester university program teaching Chinook Jargon.

In 2013, it was reported that there was one native speaker of Chinook Jargon (specifically the Grand Ronde variety). An estimated 1,000 people had oral or written knowledge of Chinook Jargon as a second language. In 2015, the U.S. Census Bureau estimated based on the self-reported American Community Survey that around 45 people (with a margin of error of 25) spoke Chinook Jargon at home in the period 2009–2013.

=== Evolution ===
There is some controversy about the origin of the Jargon, but the consensus is that the pidgin peaked in use during the 19th century. During this era, many dictionaries were published to help settlers interact with the First Nations people living in the Pacific Northwest. Local settler families exchanged communiqués that were stylishly composed entirely in "the Chinook." Many residents of the British Columbia city of Vancouver spoke Chinook Jargon as their first language, even using it at home in preference to English. Among the first Europeans to use Chinook Jargon were traders, trappers, voyageurs, coureurs des bois, and Catholic missionaries.

The original Jargon was a pidgin, originally used as a second language by speakers of other Indigenous languages in the area. It had sentence-initial negation, which is atypical of regional languages, and also had no typical complex morphology. It had an SVO structure, while Chinookan and Salishan languages were VSO. However, local Athabaskan languages were SOV, so this was probably a result of contact—a cross-language compromise. Only later did Chinook Jargon acquire significant English and French lexical items.

The Jargon is influenced by individuals' accents and terms from their native languages; as Kanakas married into First Nations and non-native families, their particular mode of the Jargon is believed to have contained Hawaiian words or Hawaiian styles of pronunciation. In some areas, the adoption of further non-aboriginal words has been observed. During the gold rush, Chinook Jargon was used in British Columbia at first by gold prospectors and Royal Engineers; as industry developed, Chinook Jargon was often used by cannery workers, hop pickers, loggers, fishermen, and ranchers. It is possible that, at one point, the population of British Columbia spoke Chinook Jargon more than any other language, even English. Historian Jane Barman wrote:

The persistence of everyday relationships between Natives and Europeans is embodied in Chinook. Emerging out of early contact and the fur trade, the Chinook jargon possesses at most 700 words derived in approximately equal proportions from the powerful Chinook Indians of the lower Columbia, from the Nootka people of Vancouver Island, and from French and English... jargon provided 'an important vehicle of communication for trading & ordinary purposes.' ...

Chinook was the language of instruction in the school for Indian children that Hills established near Victoria in 1860. ... Chinook entered the mainstream. ... It was only after mid-century, when almost all Indian adults had learned basic English in school, that everyday use of Chinook died out in British Columbia.

A heavily creolized form of Chinook Jargon is still spoken as a first language by some residents of Oregon, much as the Métis language Michif is spoken in Canada. Hence, Chinuk Wawa, as it is known in Oregon, is now a creole language, distinct from the varied pronunciation of the Chinook Jargon. There is evidence that in some communities (e.g., around Fort Vancouver) the Jargon had become creolized by the early 19th century, and that would have been among the mixed French/Métis, Algonkian, Scots and Hawaiian populations, as well as among the natives around the Fort. At Grand Ronde, the resettlement of tribes from all over Oregon in a multi-tribal agency led to the use of Chinuk Wawa as a common tongue among the linguistically diverse population. These circumstances led to the creolization of Chinuk Wawa at Grand Ronde. There is also evidence that creolization occurred at the Confederated Tribes of Siletz reservation paralleling Grand Ronde, although, due to language revitalization efforts being focused on the Tolowa language, Chinuk fell out of use.

No studies of British Columbia versions of the Jargon have demonstrated creolization. The range of varying usages and vocabulary in different regions suggests that localization did occur—although not on the pattern of Grand Ronde where Wasco, Klickitat and other peoples adopted and added to the version of the Jargon that developed there. First-language speakers of the Chinook Jargon were common in BC (native and non-native), until the mid-20th century. After 1850, the Wawa was still used in the United States portion of the Chinook-speaking world, especially in wilderness areas and work environments. Local creolization's probably did occur in British Columbia, but recorded materials have not been studied as they were made due to the focus on the traditional Indigenous languages.

== Contemporary status ==
Many words are still used throughout Oregon, Washington, British Columbia, the Yukon, and Alaska. It was the working language in canneries on the British Columbia Coast. Place names throughout this region bear Jargon names and words that are preserved in various rural industries such as logging and fishing. Linguist David Douglas Robertson and others have described Chinook Jargon as part of the shared cultural heritage of modern inhabitants of the Pacific Northwest.

As of 2009, the Confederated Tribes of the Grand Ronde Community of Oregon was taking steps to preserve Chinook Jargon use through a full immersion head start/preschool that was conducted in Chinuk Wawa. The Confederated Tribes also offer Chinuk Wawa lessons at their offices in Eugene and Portland. In addition, Lane Community College offers two years of Chinuk Wawa study that satisfy the second-language graduation requirements of Oregon public universities. In March 2012, the tribe published a Chinuk Wawa dictionary through University of Washington Press.

At her swearing-in as lieutenant governor in 2001, Iona Campagnolo concluded her speech in Chinook, saying "konoway tillicums klatawa kunamokst klaska mamook okoke huloima chee illahie" – Chinook for "everyone was thrown together to make this strange new country [British Columbia]", lit. 'All people go together they make this strange new land'.

An art installation featuring Chinook Jargon, "Welcome to the Land of Light" by Henry Tsang, can be viewed on the Seawall along False Creek in downtown Vancouver, British Columbia, between Davie and Drake streets. Translation into Chinook Jargon was done by Duane Pasco.

A short film using Chinook Jargon, Small Pleasures by Karin Lee, explores intercultural dialogue between three women of different cultural and linguistic backgrounds in 1890s Barkerville in northern British Columbia.

== Revitalization attempt ==
=== Grand Ronde ===
In 1997, the Grand Ronde reservation in Northern Oregon hired Tony Johnson, a Chinook linguist, to head its language program. Chinuk Wawa was chosen due to its strong connection to Indigenous identity on the reservation as well as being the only Indigenous language still spoken at Grand Ronde. Prior to this, there were formal Chinuk Wawa classes taught by Eula Holmes from 1978 until her death in 1986. Eula Holmes' sister, Ila, held informal and sporadic classes to teach the language to the public. Henry Zenk was brought onto the project in 1998 after having previous experience with the language, documenting it in the late 1970s and early 1980s. Community classes were started in the summer of 1998, and a dictionary was released in 2012. This dictionary was compiled from the Chinuk Wawa of Grand Ronde elders, chiefly from the Hudson, Wacheno and Riggs families. The dictionary features a section on Chinuk Wawa recorded by Indigenous peoples of the lower Columbia but not used by the Elders at Grand Ronde. In 2014, the tribe made an app spanning traditional and modern vocabulary.

In 2001, with funding from the Administration for Native Americans, the tribe started an immersion preschool. A kindergarten was started in 2004 by Kathy Cole, a tribal member and certified teacher, which has since expanded to a half-day immersion K–4 with slots for 25 students at Willamina Elementary School. Cole also started Chinuk Wawa elective classes at Willamina High School in 2011. Students there and at Willamina Middle School can earn high school and college credit for completion of the course. Lane Community College also teaches a two-year course of Chinuk Wawa.

=== British Columbia ===
By 2012, it was discovered that there was only one person left in British Columbia who had learned Chinook Jargon from Elders. That person was Jay Powell, a University of British Columbia anthropological linguist who had dedicated himself to the revitalization of Indigenous languages. A small group led by Sam Sullivan formed around him, organizing learning sessions and starting the BC Chinook Jargon initiative website. Sullivan's efforts to expand public awareness of Chinook Jargon have included an interview with Powell conducted entirely in that language. The interview was organized through Kumtuks, a British Columbia focused educational video series whose name comes from the Chinook word for knowledge.

The online magazine Kaltash Wawa was founded in November 2020 using BC Chinook Jargon and written in Chinuk Pipa, the alphabet based on Dupoyan shorthand.

== Influence on English ==
British Columbian English and Pacific Northwest English have several words still in current use which are loanwords from the Chinook Jargon, which was widely spoken throughout the Pacific Northwest by all ethnicities well into the middle of the 20th century. These words tend to strongly index a local settler identity. Some words used to be shared with the Yukon, Alberta, Oregon, Washington, Alaska and, to a lesser degree, Idaho and western Montana.

=== Chinook Jargon words used by English-language speakers ===
- Cheechako – 'newcomer'; the word is formed from chee ('new') + chako ('come') and was used to refer to non-native people.
- Chuck – 'water'; and thus saltchuck 'salt water'. Colchuck Peak and Colchuck Glacier in the Alpine Lakes Wilderness take their name from Colchuck Lake, 'cold water'. The name of the Skookum-chuck river means 'strong-water', 'rapids'.
- Cultus – 'bad, worthless, useless', 'ordinary', or 'evil, taboo'. Cultus iktus means 'worthless junk'.
- Hiyu – less common nowadays, but still heard in some places to mean 'party' or 'gathering'. From the Chinook for 'many, several, lots of'. The Big Hiyu (also known as "The July") was a week-long joint celebration of the July 1 Dominion Day and July 4 Independence Day holidays in the Fraser Canyon town of Lillooet, featuring horse races, gambling, a rodeo and other festivities. A tenas hiyu ('small gathering') was on a much smaller scale. The community of West Seattle celebrated the month of July for over 80 years with the HiYu Summer Festival from 1934 until 2017.
- Iktus – 'stuff'; also pronounced itkus with t and k reversed.
- Klootchman or klootch – in the Jargon meaning simply 'a woman' or 'female" (of anything) – klootchman kiuatan ('mare'), klootchman lecosho ('sow'), tenas klootchman or klootchman tenas ('girl, female child'). Still in use in English in some areas and with people of an older background to mean a First Nations woman, or to refer to the wives/women attached to a certain group in a joking way e.g. "we sent all the klootchman to the kitchen while we played cards". Unlike its male equivalent siwash, klootchman does not generally have a derisive tone nowadays (when used).
- Masi – 'thank you'. In northern British Columbia and the Yukon, and used in broadcast English in those areas, the Chinook Jargon adaption of the French merci remains common, i.e. mahsi or masi, with the accent on the first syllable (unlike in French).
- It is possible that the slang term moolah, meaning 'money' in American slang, comes from the Jargon word moolah meaning 'mill' in Chinook (lumber mills were a source of wealth in the PNW).
- Mucky muck or muckamuck – in the Jargon means 'plenty of food' and came to connote one who lived well, thus in colloquial English an important or officious person. On long-distance journeys such as for trade the "muckamuck" of the expedition referred to an experienced trustworthy person (but not necessarily wealthy) chosen to lead the expedition and among other duties was tasked with portioning out and protecting the food supply. Related to this is high muckety muck, or Chinook hyas muckamuck.
- Potlatch – in Chinook Jargon is a ceremony among certain tribes involving food and exchange of gifts, nowadays sometimes used to refer to a potluck dinner or sometimes the giving away of personal items to friends.
- Quiggly, quiggly hole – refers to the remains of an old Indian pit-house, or underground house, from kickwillie or kekuli, which in the Jargon means 'down' or 'underneath, beneath'.
- Siwash – (/ˈsaɪwɑːʃ/ SY-wahsh) properly a First Nations man, but sometimes used for women as well. The origins and meaning may be considered pejorative and derogatory French sauvage. When pronounced /səˈwɑːʃ/ sə-WAHSH, with the rhythm of the original French, it is used by modern speakers of the Chinook Jargon in Grand Ronde, Oregon, with the context of meaning a Native American, or as an adjective connoting connection thereto, such as in Siwash Rock or Siwash Sweaters. The /ˈsaɪwɑːʃ/ pronunciation is considered offensive in Grand Ronde.
- Skookum – The most versatile is skookum, which was used in the Jargon either as a verb auxiliary for 'to be able' or an adjective for 'able, strong, big', 'genuine', 'reliable' – which sums up its use in British Columbian English, although there is a wide range of possible usages: skookum house is 'jail', prison' (house in the Jargon could mean anything from a building to a room). "He's a skookum guy" means that the person is solid and reliable, while "we need somebody who's skookum" means that a strong and large person is needed. A carpenter, after banging a stud into place, might check it and decide, "Yeah, that's skookum". Asking for affirmation, someone might say "is that skookum" or "is that skookum with you?" Skookum can also be translated simply as 'O.K.', but it means something a bit more emphatic.
- Tenas – 'small'.
- Tillicum – 'people/person', 'family', and 'people'.
- Tolo – used in Western Washington to mean a semi-formal dance, analogous to the homecoming ball, to which girls ask boys. From the Chinook for 'to win'.
- Tyee – 'leader, chief, boss'. Also Big Tyee in the context of 'boss' or well-known person. In Campbell River and in the sport-fishing business, a really big chinook salmon is a Tyee. In the Jargon Tyee meant chief, and could also be an adjective denoting 'big', as with tyee salmon or tyee lamel ('boss mule'). A hyas tyee means 'important/big ruler/leader', and is also sometimes used in English in the same way as Big Tyee. e.g. "He was the undisputed hyas tyee of all the country between the Johnstone Strait and Comox". This was also the common title used for the famous chiefs of the early era, such as Maquinna, for whom it was applied by Captain Vancouver and others in the context of 'king'. The Hyas Klootchman Tyee – 'Great Woman Ruler', roughly 'Her Majesty' – was the historical term for Queen Victoria. The word tyee was commonly used and still occurs in some local English usages meaning 'boss' or 'someone in charge'. Business and local political and community figures of a certain stature from some areas are sometimes referred to in the British Columbia papers and histories by the old chiefly name worn by Maquinna, Concomly and Nicola. A man called hyas tyee would have been a senator, a longtime MP or MLA, or a business magnate with a strong local powerbase, long-time connections, and wealth from and because of the area. There is a popular British Columbia news site named The Tyee. Beginning in 1900, Tyee was also the title of the University of Washington yearbook.

=== Notable non-natives known to speak Chinook Jargon ===
- Francis Jones Barnard
- Francis Stillman Barnard
- Sir Matthew Baillie Begbie
- Franz Boas
- Sir James Douglas
- Myron Eells
- Joshua Green
- Phoebe Goodell Judson
- Father Jean-Marie-Raphaël Le Jeune
- Sir Richard McBride
- John McLoughlin
- Morley Roberts
- Robert William Service
- Sam Sullivan
- Theodore Winthrop

== Orthographies ==
There are a few main spelling variations of Chinook Jargon but each individual writer also had their own spelling variations.

1. Spelling based on English, French and German – In a general sense, when words were derived from English or French, the original English/French spellings were used. Words not derived from English/French were written in an approximate spelling based on mainstream English, French or German spelling. This would mean, for example, "kloochman" (an English-style spelling of Nootka łuucmaa) for "woman, wife"; "house" (English origin) for "house"; and "le clou" (French origin) for "nail, claw". Spellings in this category do not take into account the actual mainstream pronunciation of the words in Chinook Jargon.
2. Approximate sound-based spelling in English – With every writer having their own variation of a fairly standardized spelling based on their own dialect, the same examples above could be "tlotchmin, haws, leklo".
3. IPA-based spelling using only the characters available on early computers – This was used on the Chinook Jargon Listserve in the 1990s and other places where it was difficult or impossible to type using actual IPA symbols. Compare X-SAMPA, another ASCII transcription of IPA.
4. IPA-based Grand Ronde spelling – This is only used by speakers of the Grand Ronde dialect in Oregon.

Spelling variations
Listserv symbol	Grand Ronde variations	Other variations	IPA	English
?, 7			ʔ	uh - oh (glottal stop)
!			ʼ	ejective (comes after the ejective consonant)
h			ʰ	aspiration (comes after the aspirated consonant)
w			V̹	rounded (comes after the vowel/consonant to be rounded)
a			ɑː	father
ay, ai			aɪ	sky, bite
aw, ow			aʊ	cow, mouth
b			b	bill
c		ts	ts	pots
ch		tj, ty, sh, s	tʃ	church
e, eh			e	bet
E, V, v		u, o, e	ʌ	but, mutt
ey, ei			eɪ	say
d			d	dog
f			f	fat
g			g	get
h			h	happy
I			ɪ	bit
iː		ee	i	beat
k			k	scat (unaspirated)
kw			kʷ	squat (unaspirated)
l			l	love
L, hl			ɬ	clock (lateral fricative)
tl, thl			tɬ	lateral affricate
m			m	mom
n			n	no (note that in some native languages and thus CJ dialects, "n" and "l" were pronounced so similarly they would switch between one and the other)
o			oʊ	no
p			p	spit (unaspirated)
q			qʷ	deep "queen" (uvular "k" with lips rounded) (unaspirated)
r			ɹ	rob (note that most northern dialects pronounce "l" in place of "r": e.g. "rob" and "lob" are said the same)
s			s	sink
sh			ʃ	shoot
t			t	style (unaspirated)
uw		oo, u	uː	moon
u		ê	ʊ	book, put
uy			uɪ	buoy (depending on dialect)
w			w	water
x			x	velar fricative (Scottish English "loch")
X			χ	uvular fricative
y		i	j	year

Jargon Chinook Alphabet (Grande Ronde):

- a
- ch
- c’h
- ə
- h
- i
- k
- kʰ
- kw
- kʰw
- k’
- k’w
- l
- ɬ
- m
- n
- p
- pʰ
- p’
- q
- qʰ
- qw
- qʰw
- q’
- q’w
- s
- sh
- t
- tʰ
- t’
- tɬ
- t’ɬ
- ts
- t’s
- u
- w
- x
- xw
- x̣
- x̣w
- y
- ʔ

== See also ==
- List of Chinook Jargon placenames
- Nootka Jargon
- American Indian Pidgin English
