= Henry Zenk =

American linguist and anthropologist

Henry B. Zenk
- Born: 1944 (age 81–82)
- Education: PhD (Anthropology), University of Oregon (1984)
- Alma mater: Portland State University (MA); University of Oregon (PhD)
- Occupations: Linguist; anthropologist
- Known for: Documentation of Chinuk Wawa; dictionary work for the Confederated Tribes of Grand Ronde

Henry B. Zenk (born 1944) is an American linguist and anthropologist whose work focuses on Indigenous languages of the Pacific Northwest, including Chinuk Wawa and Kalapuyan languages. He has served as a linguistic consultant for the Confederated Tribes of Grand Ronde since 1998.

== Education ==
Zenk completed an M.A. thesis in anthropology at Portland State University in 1976. According to The Oregon Encyclopedia, he earned a Ph.D. in anthropology at the University of Oregon in 1984, drawing on field documentation of Chinuk Wawa with elder speakers in the Grand Ronde community.

== Career and research ==
The Oregon Encyclopedia describes Zenk as documenting Chinuk Wawa with surviving first-language elder speakers of the Grand Ronde community and notes that this documentation informed his doctoral research; it further states that he has served as a linguistic consultant for the Confederated Tribes of Grand Ronde since 1998.

A 2011 report in Smoke Signals (the newspaper of the Confederated Tribes of Grand Ronde) describes Zenk as an anthropologist with a University of Oregon Ph.D. (1984), notes that he first came to Grand Ronde in 1978, and reports that he had worked on the tribe's Chinuk Wawa dictionary effort since 1998.

Zenk has also written for public-facing venues on the history and use of Chinuk Wawa in Oregon. For example, he authored an overview entry on Chinuk Wawa for The Oregon Encyclopedia. In 2022, Oregon Public Broadcasting described him as a “foremost authority on Oregon Indigenous languages,” in the context of Kalapuya documentation and revitalization efforts.

== Selected works ==
- Zenk, Henry B. Contributions to Tualatin Ethnography: Subsistence and Ethnobiology. M.A. thesis, Portland State University, 1976.
- Zenk, Henry. “Bringing ‘good Jargon’ to Light: The New Chinuk Wawa Dictionary of the Confederated Tribes of Grand Ronde, Oregon.” Oregon Historical Quarterly 113 (4) (Winter 2012).
- Zenk, Henry B.; Johnson, Tony A. “Uncovering the Chinookan roots of Chinuk Wawa: a new look at the linguistic and historical record.” (conference paper / working paper, 2004).
- Chinuk Wawa: kakwa nsayka ulman-tilixam laska munk-kemteks nsayka / As Our Elders Teach Us to Speak It. Grand Ronde, Oregon: Confederated Tribes of the Grand Ronde Community of Oregon; distributed by University of Washington Press, 2012. ISBN 9780295991863.
