= Kamloops Wawa =

Missionary newspaper from British Columbia, Canada

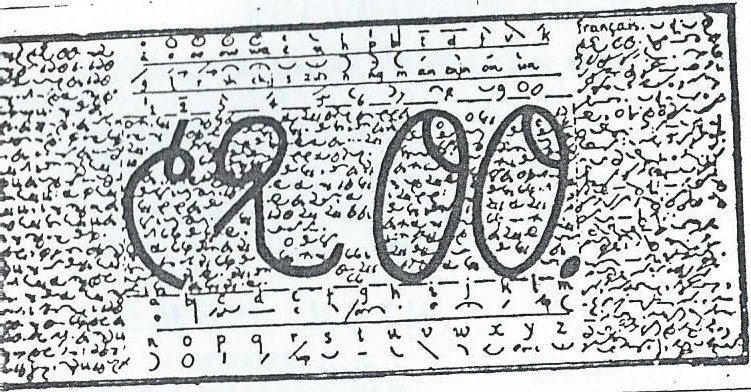
Imprint of the Kamloops Wawa newspaper, November 1896

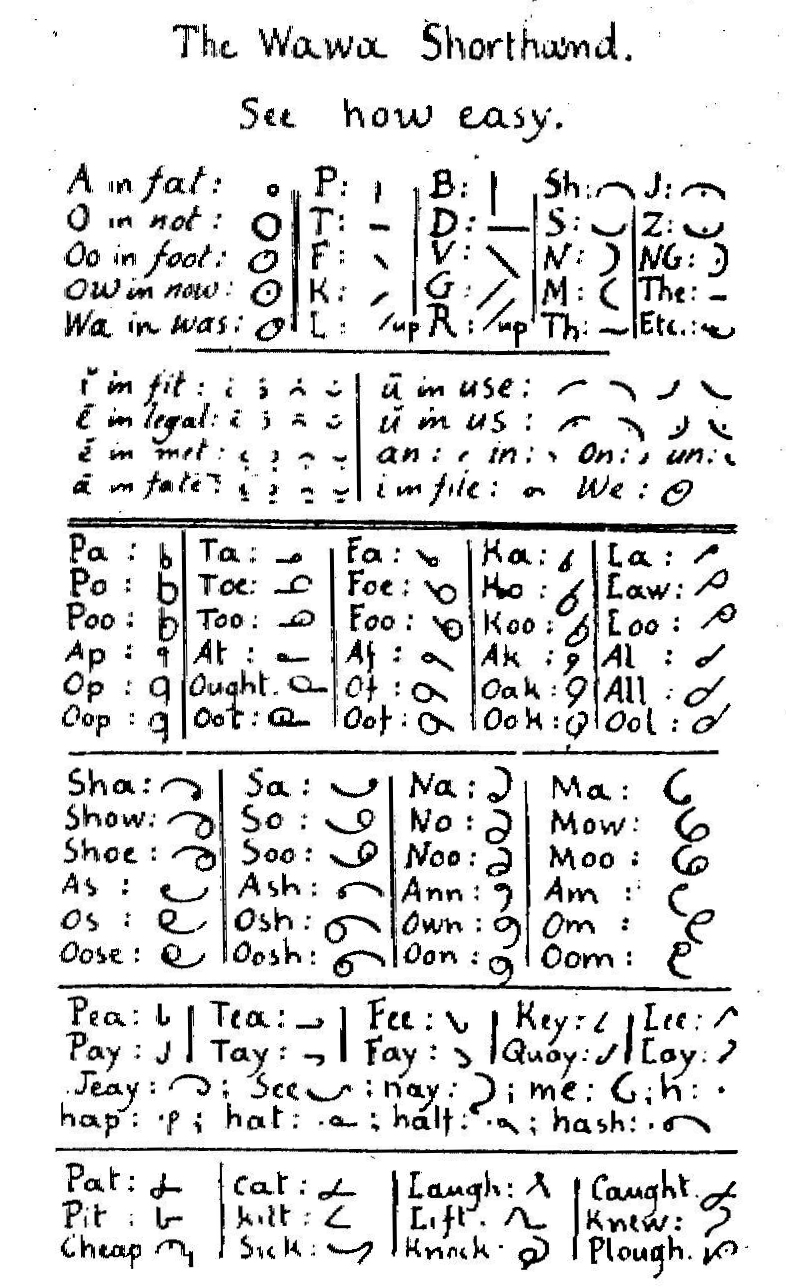
Introduction to Kamloops Wawa shorthand found in each issue

The Kamloops Wawa (Chinook Jargon: 𛰅𛱁𛰙‌𛰆𛱛𛰂𛰜 𛱜‌𛱜, "Talk of Kamloops") was a newspaper published by Father Jean-Marie-Raphaël Le Jeune, superior of the Roman Catholic Diocese of Kamloops in British Columbia, Canada, beginning May 25, 1891, and continuing into the 1900s. The contents of the Kamloops Wawa were near-entirely written using Le Jeune's adaptation of the French Duployan shorthand writing system, called "chinuk pipa" in Chinook Jargon itself. Most of the texts of the Kamloops Wawa were composed in the local variant of Chinook Jargon with some passages and articles in Nlaka'pamuxtsin, Secwepmectsin, St'at'imcets and other traditional languages. Some series of articles, however, included translations into Chinook Jargon of classical texts from Latin, such as the Seven Kings of Rome, though most content was either community news or translations of the mass or other liturgical materials.

== Origin of Chinook writing ==
During a meeting of the Oblate missionaries in June 1890 at New Westminster, the missionaries discussed the unsuitability of the highly successful Carrier syllabics to writing the native languages in British Columbia. Father J. D. Chiappini suggested the use of shorthand to teach literacy to First Nations people, which would have the advantage of being suitable for European, as well as the native languages of British Columbia. In August, Father LeJeune had traveled back to the Kamloops area, and began his first attempt at teaching writing to the native peoples. His efforts remained unsuccessful until a visit to Coldwater (near Merritt), where a lame native, Charlie Alexis Mayous, began studying in earnest. Father LeJuene left Mayous shortly thereafter with a notebook of lessons on the alphabet and common prayers. Upon returning in December, LeJuene found that Mayous had completely learned the shorthand, and deciphered and memorized all of the prayers, and could read French and English with equal proficiency to his native tongue, and began to instruct other natives in the Chinook writing.

Before Christmas, LeJeune and Mayous traveled to Douglas Lake, with Mayous again acting as teacher, while LeJeune prepared lesson books, the locals being so eager to learn the shorthand that they sharpened his pencils so he would not have to stop writing. After Christmas, the natives of Douglas Lake wanted to keep Mayous, so as to continue their instruction, but the natives of Coldwater would not allow him to remain behind. LeJeune returned to Coldwater around Easter to find that Mayous had taught everyone the shorthand, and that everyone could their prayers in the Thompson language.

== Early issues of the Kamloops Wawa ==
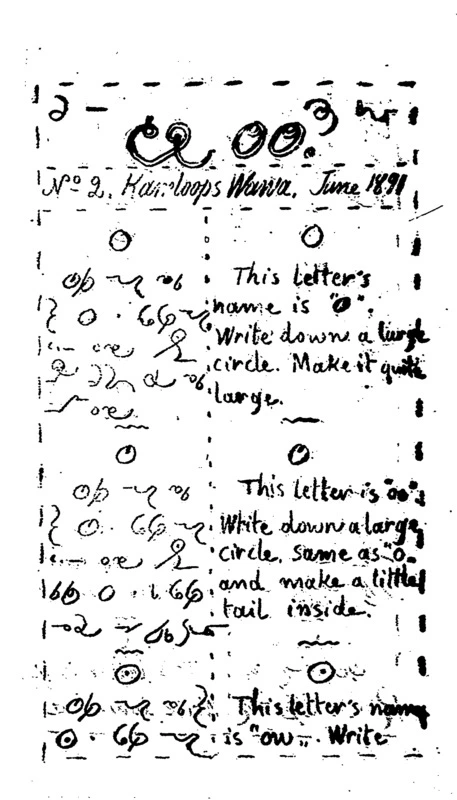
Kamloops Wawa – front cover, issue 2, June 1891

Father LeJeune's success at teaching the shorthand was limited by his ability to write instructional materials in addition to his clerical duties. In February 1891, he attempted to use a hectograph to create materials, which worked reasonably well, but in March, he read an advertisement for an Edison mimeograph, which he immediately ordered. On May 25, LeJeune published the first issue of the Kamloops Wawa, but only printed a few issues of the paper before shutting it down due to a lack of subscriptions. In July 1891, a large gathering of the first nations by Bishop Durieu in Kamloops brought attention to the fact that the natives of Coldwater and Douglas Lake were able to write down songs that they did not know. After the Kamloops gathering, Father LeJeune was assigned to the Shuswap, who having been impressed by the literacy of the Thompson people at Kamloops, endeavored to learn the shorthand later that month at their meeting at Little Shuswap Lake. Within two months, most of these natives could read nearly anything written in Chinook Jargon or Shuswap. That fall, LeJeune continued to teach the shorthand at every village he stopped in, dispensing with practice lessons in favour of actual Chinook texts, consisting mostly of biblical verses and hymns.

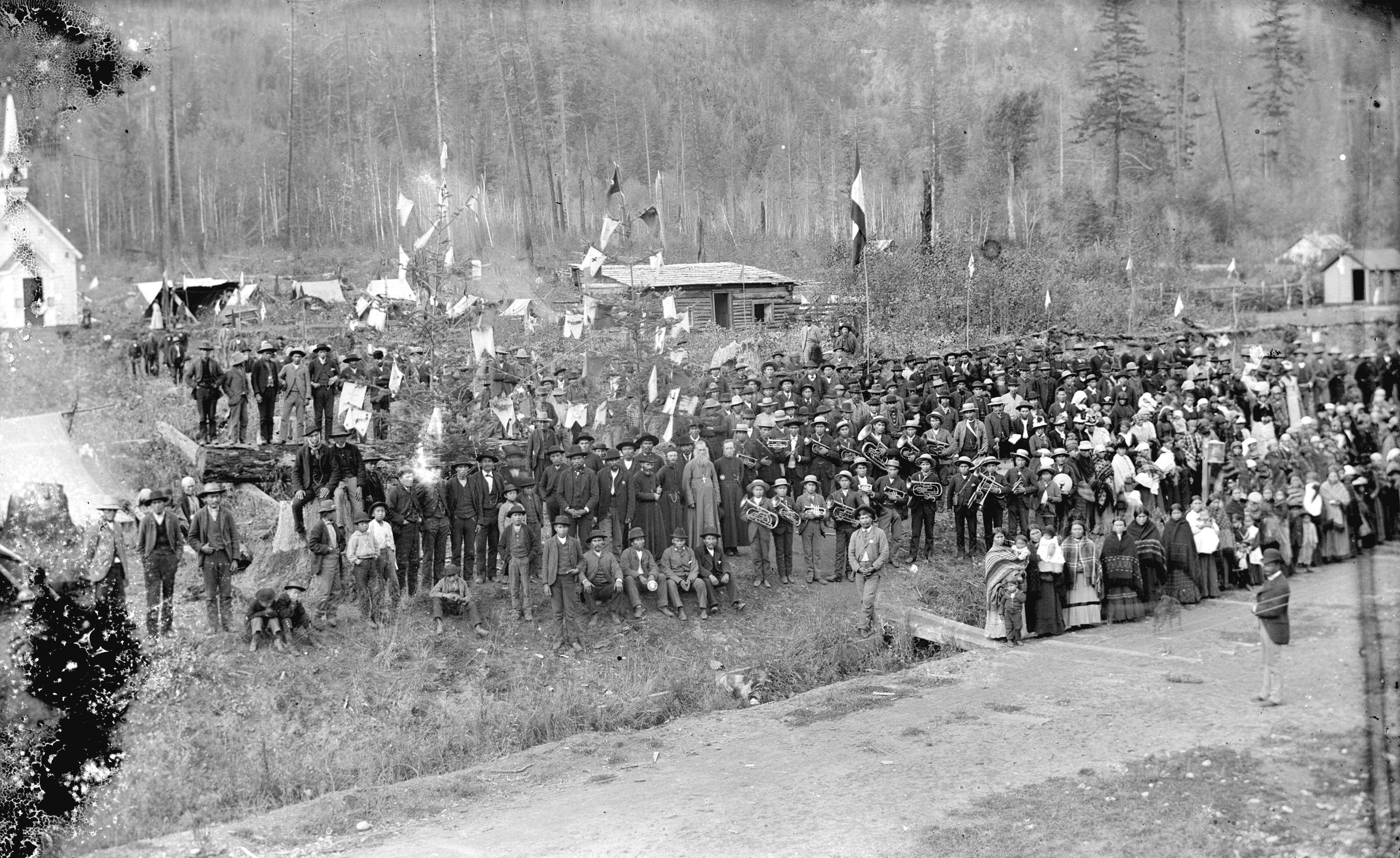
Father Le Jeune at North Bend, BC with Bishop Durieu and the local Indigenous community c. 1890. Villages like North Bend feature prominently in the local news section.

With many natives now eagerly pursuing the learning of shorthand, LeJeune resumed printing the Kamloops Wawa on February 2, 1892, with an initial run of 25, then 100, then 150, 200, and 250 copies. By the end of the year, as many as 300 copies of each edition of the Kamloops Wawa were being printed. In 1893, Monsignor Durieu translated the Old Testament into Chinook Jargon, and copies of the Durieu text were included as a 16-page per month supplement to the Kamloops Wawa in 1893. Also, prayers in Latin, Chinook, Thompson, and Okanangan, and a copy of Our Lady of Lourdes were likewise printed.

== See also ==
- Duployan shorthand
- Duployan (Unicode block) and Shorthand Format Controls (Unicode block)
- Chinook Jargon
- Canadian Aboriginal syllabics
