= Pleyber-Christ Parish close =

Coordinates: 48.5053°N 3.8739°W

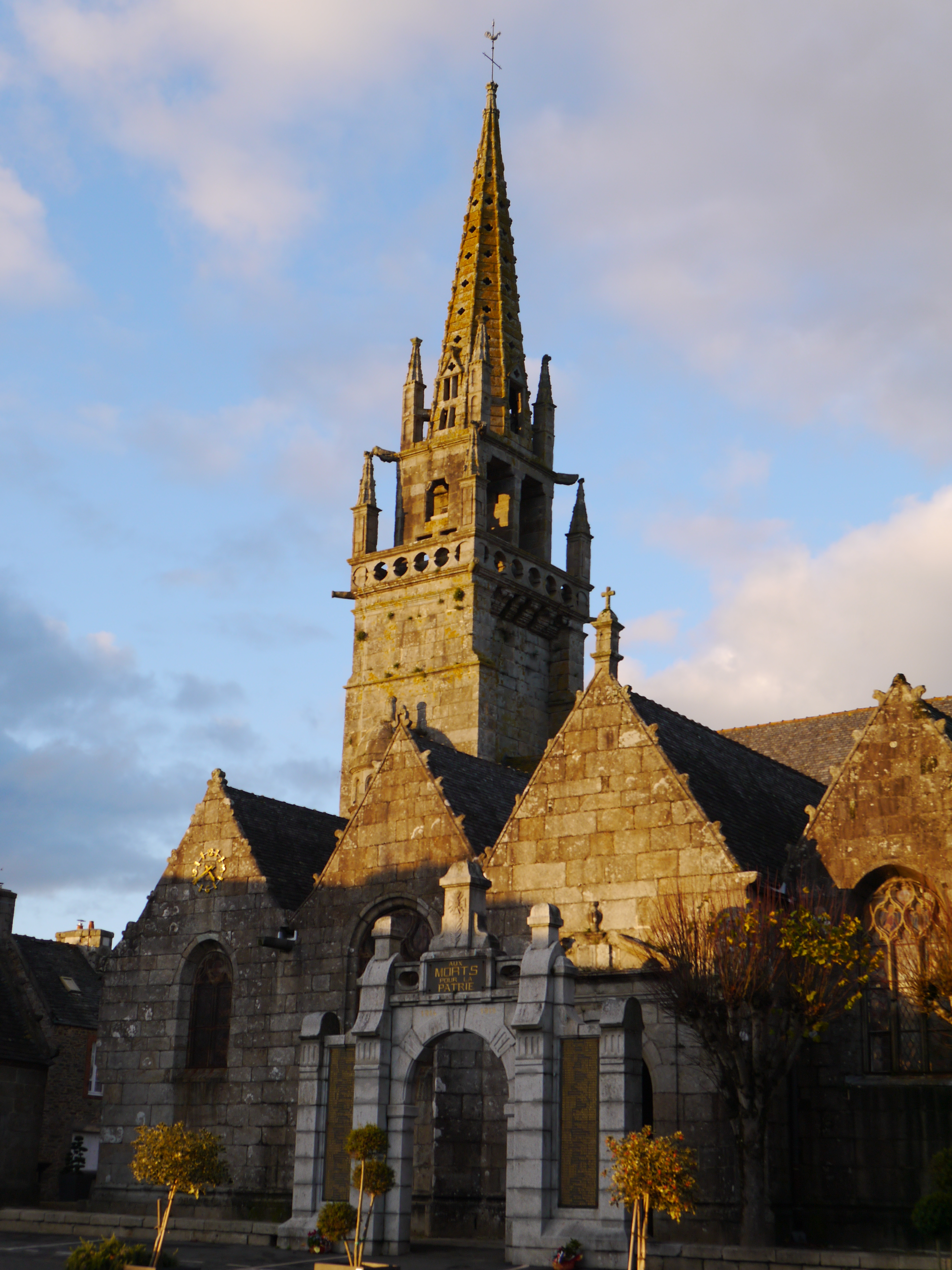
The Saint-Pierre church at Pleyber-Christ

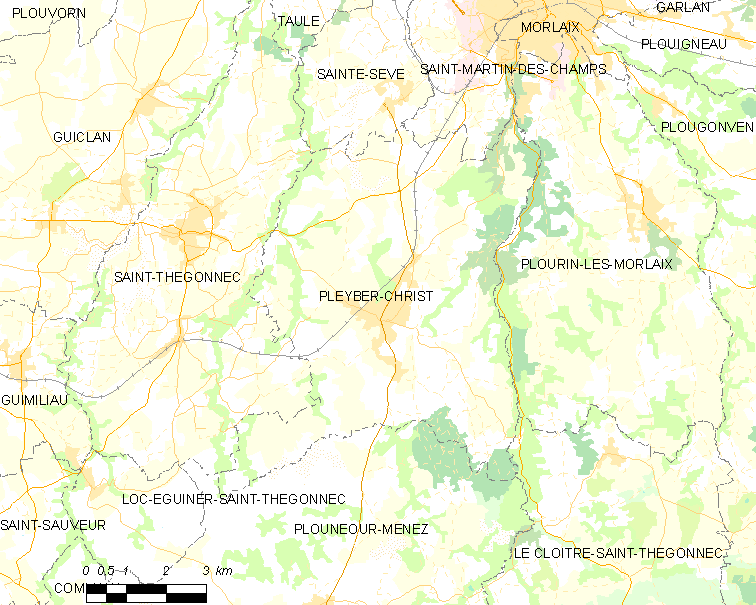
Map showing the location of Pleyber-Christ

The Pleyber-Christ Parish close (Enclos paroissial) is located at Pleyber-Christ in the arrondissement of Morlaix in Finistère in Brittany in north-western France. The Saint Pierre church has been listed as a historical monument since 1914 and had been completely reconstructed in the middle of the 16th century commencing with the tower built in 1551. It replaced an earlier church, thought to date to before 1400. The church has a magnificent central altar with the Rosary altarpiece to the left and the Saint Joseph altarpiece to the right. Statues of Saint Eloi and Saint Herbot stand at the entrance to the choir.

== The ossuary ==
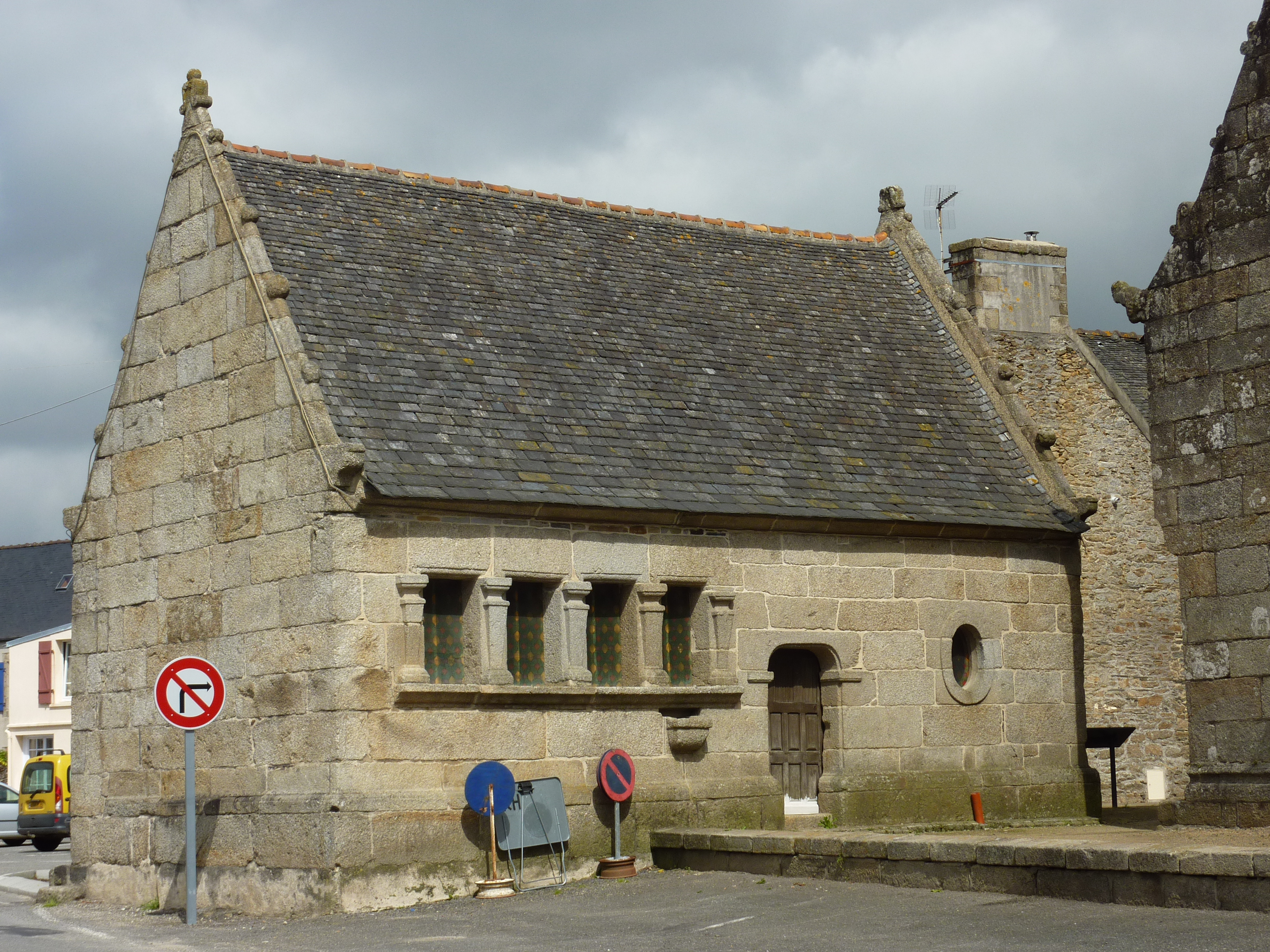
The ossuary

This was built in 1737 replacing an older building and was used for only a short time.

== The south porch ==
This dates to 1666 and in the interior are statues of the apostles attributed to Roland Doré's workshop and above the porch, also by Doré, is a statue depicting Jesus in an evangelical role with Saint Peter ("Collation de Saint-Pierre"). Saint Peter kneels as Christ hands him the keys to heaven and between them Doré adds three sheep, recalling that Christ gave Peter three keys. Doré also executed the Kervern cross at Saint-Donat in 1647 and the calvary at Saint-Eloi. Doré completed eighty-nine statues of the apostles for parish churches but only at Pleyber-Christ and Plestin-les-Grèves did he completed all twelve men. At Pleyber-Christ, the sculptor added a dragon to the cup held by John the Evangelist as an allegory for the poison which was to kill him.

== Stained glass windows ==
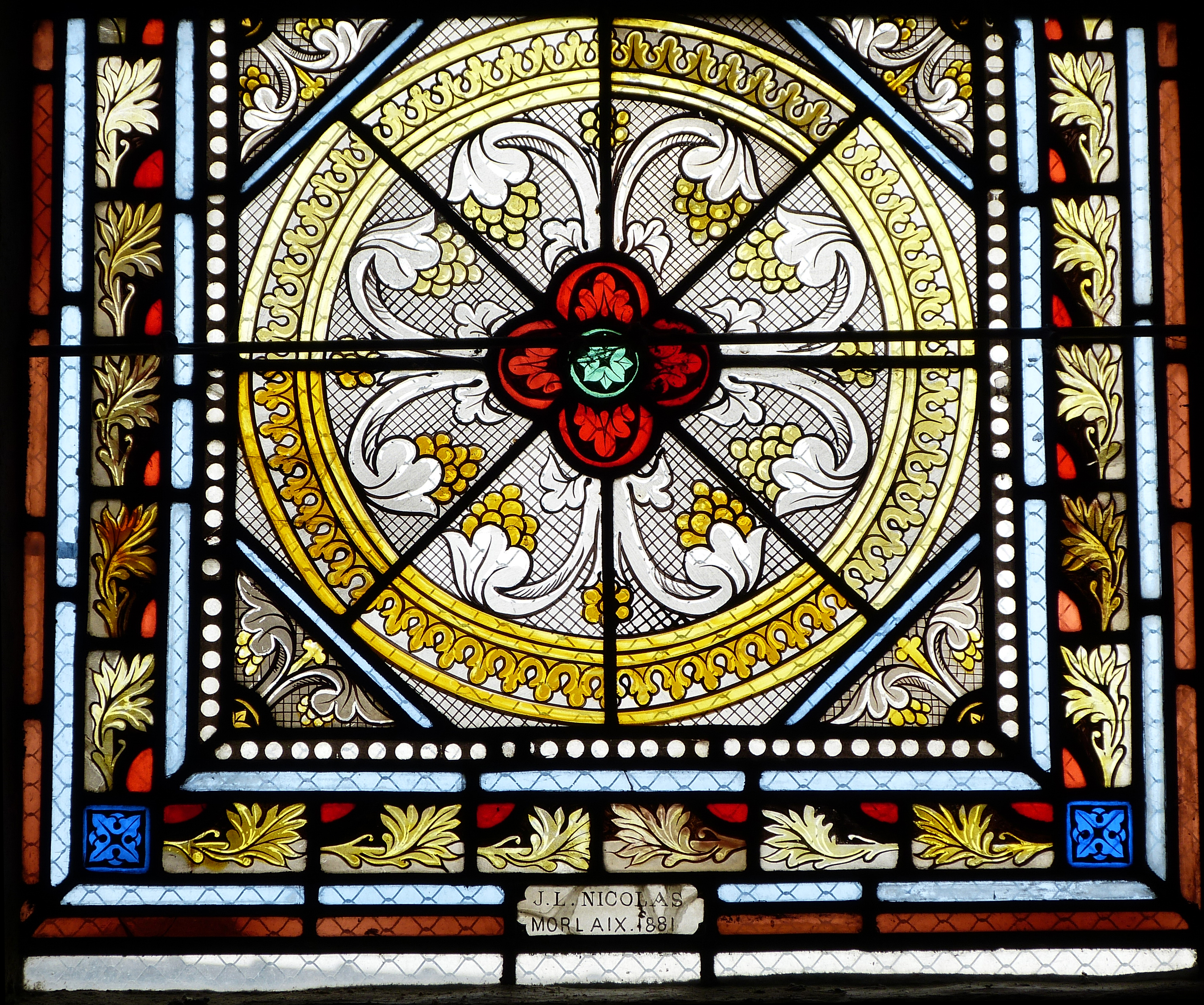
Stained glass by Morlaix's J.L.Nicolas this dating to 1881

Several of the stained glass windows in the church are by J.L.Nicolas of Morlaix.

== The Rosary altar ==
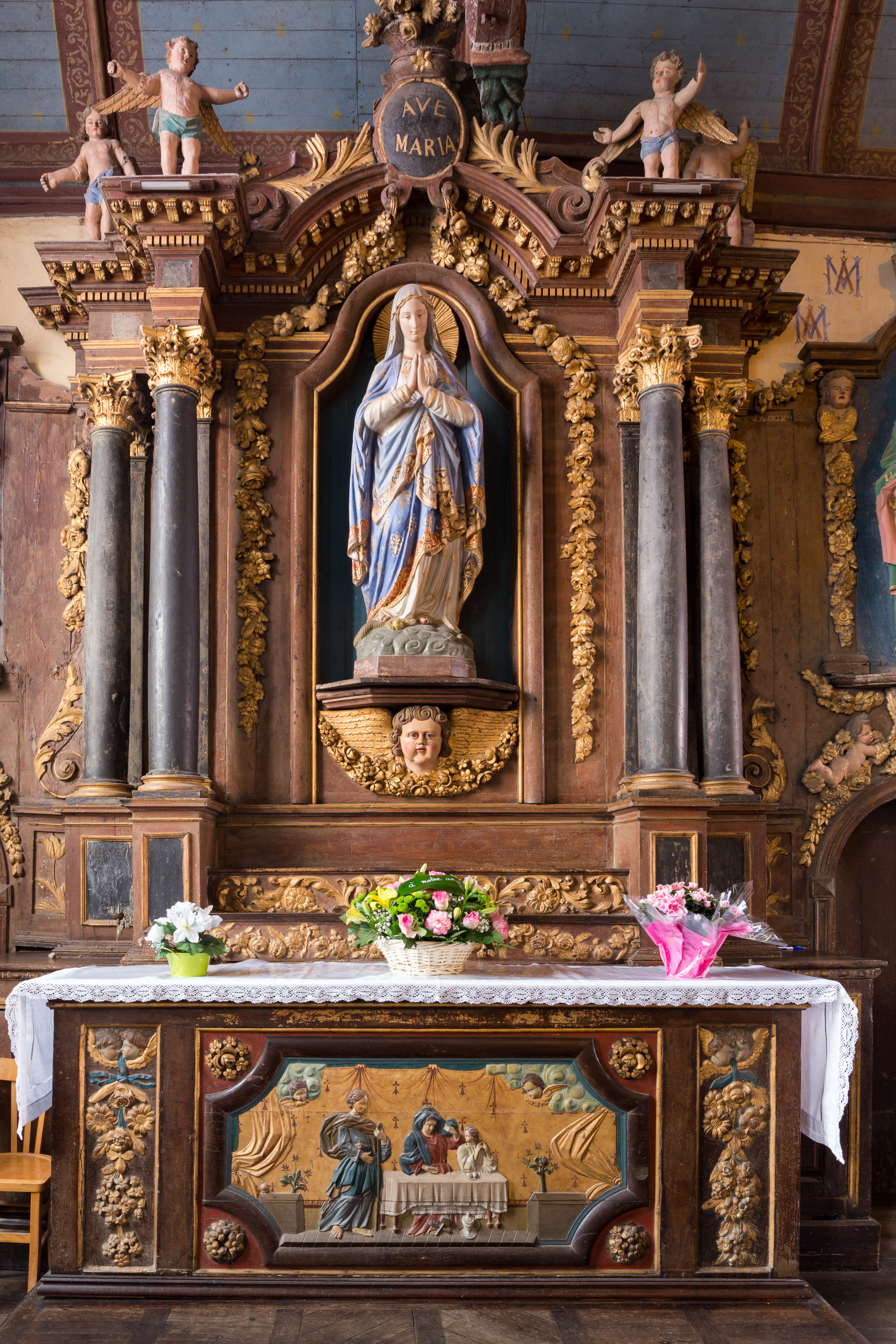
The Rosary altar

This altar is located in the church.

== The Saint Joseph altar ==
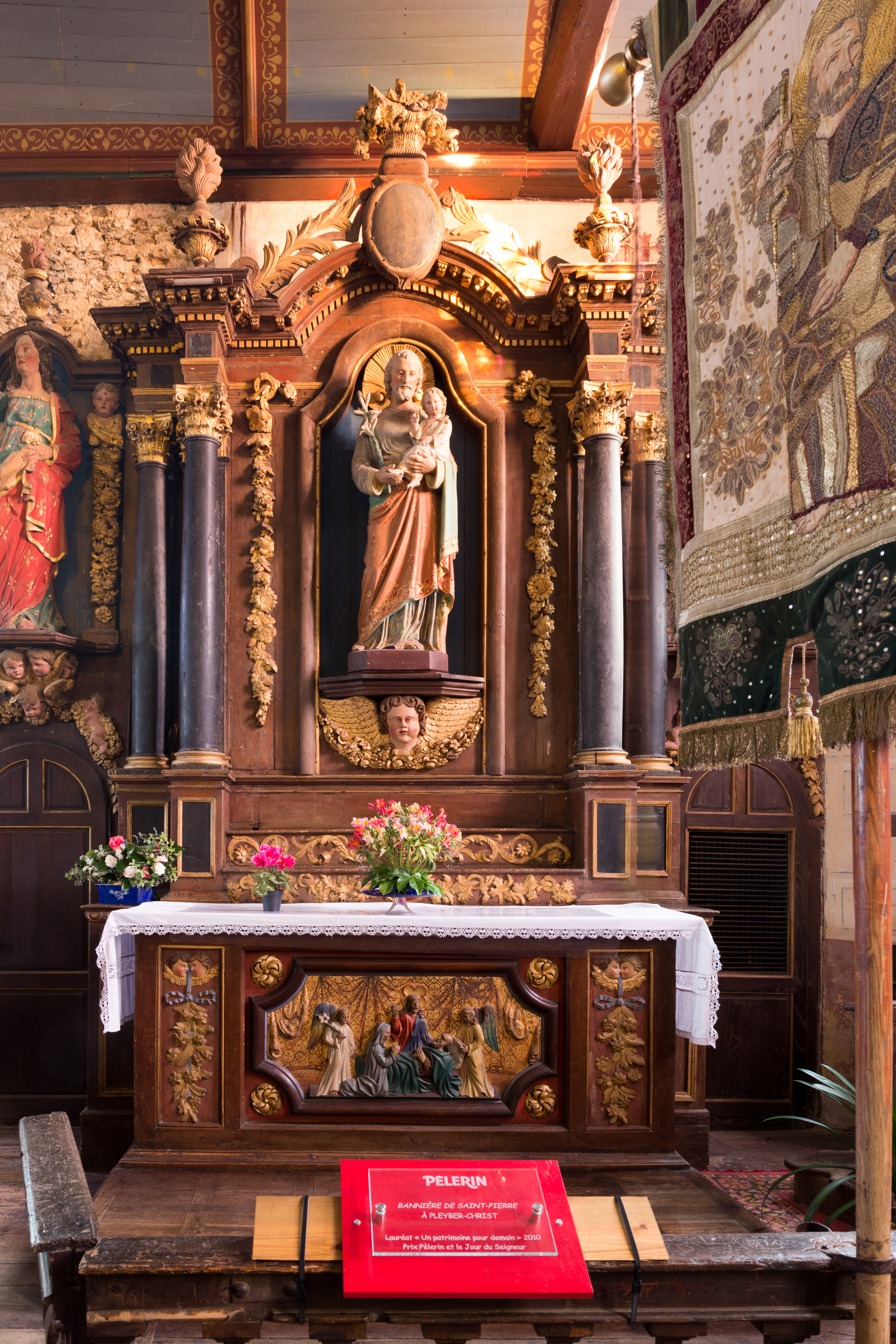

The Saint-Joseph altar is to be found in the church and next to this altar is the Saint-Peter processional banner.

== The pulpit ==
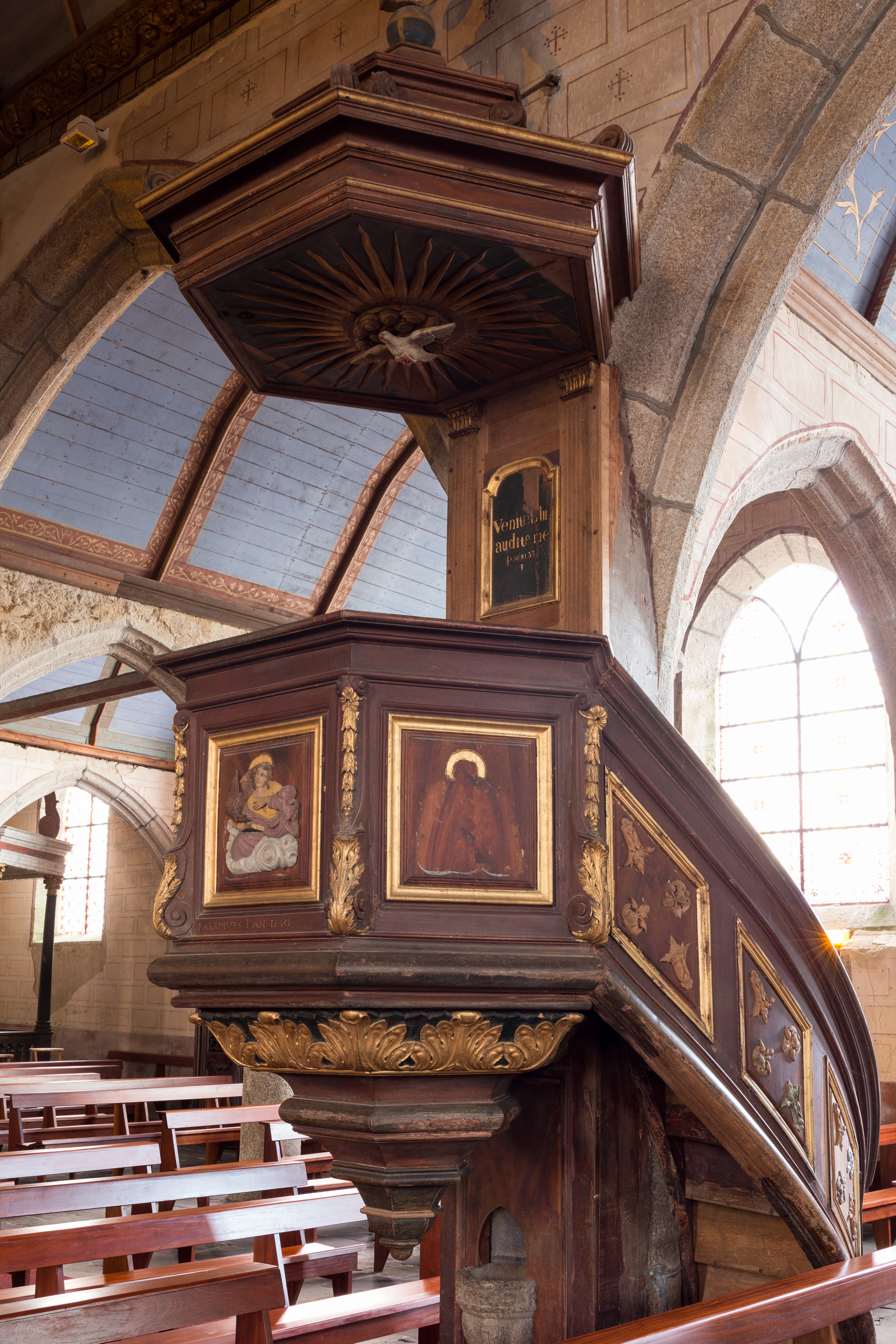
The pulpit at the église Saint-Pierre in Pleyber-Christ

The pulpit in the église Saint-Pierre and the abat-voix date to 1740 and bear the inscription " F.F.P. MONSIEUR LABBE DE KSVLOVEN/B FRANCOIS. MADEC 8/VEAN MER. FABRIQUES - LAN. 1740". At the top of the pulpit is a depiction of an angel blowing a trumpet.
