= Henry Tsang (artist) =

Canadian artist (born 1964)

Henry Tsang (born 1964 in Hong Kong) is a contemporary Canadian artist.

== Life ==
Tsang was born October 8, 1964, in Hong Kong and immigrated to Canada with his family in 1968. He lives in Vancouver, where he teaches art at Emily Carr University of Art and Design.

== Public works ==
Tsang's public artwork Welcome to the Land of Light, a 100-metre long sculpture consisting of a welcome message in Chinook Jargon, is permanently installed on the northern side of False Creek, Vancouver. This work uses fibre optic cable lighting and marine-grade aluminum lettering to highlight texts based on translations to and from Chinook Jargon, a 19th-century trade language local to the Northwest Coast, and English. Welcome to the Land of Light speaks to the histories of immigration in Vancouver and the promise of new technologies (fibre optics).

== Collections ==
Tsang's work is included in the Vancouver Public Library's Art Bank collection and in the Canada Council Art Bank.

== Awards ==
In 1993 Tsang received a VIVA award from the Jack and Doris Shadbolt foundation.
