= Émile Duployé =

French clergyman and shorthand system creator

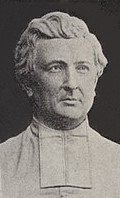
Bust of Émile Duployé

Émile Duployé was a French clergyman, born in 1833 in Liesse-Notre-Dame (Aisne) and died in 1912 in Saint-Maur-des-Fosses (now in Val-de-Marne).

He is the author of the Duployan shorthand technique which was widely used in France in the early twentieth century.

He wrote a series of books on this subject, whose first edition was named Stenography-Duployé, writing easier, faster and more readable than any other, which applies to all languages (published in Lyon in 1860).

== See also ==
- Catholic Church in France
