= Karin Lee =

Canadian film maker

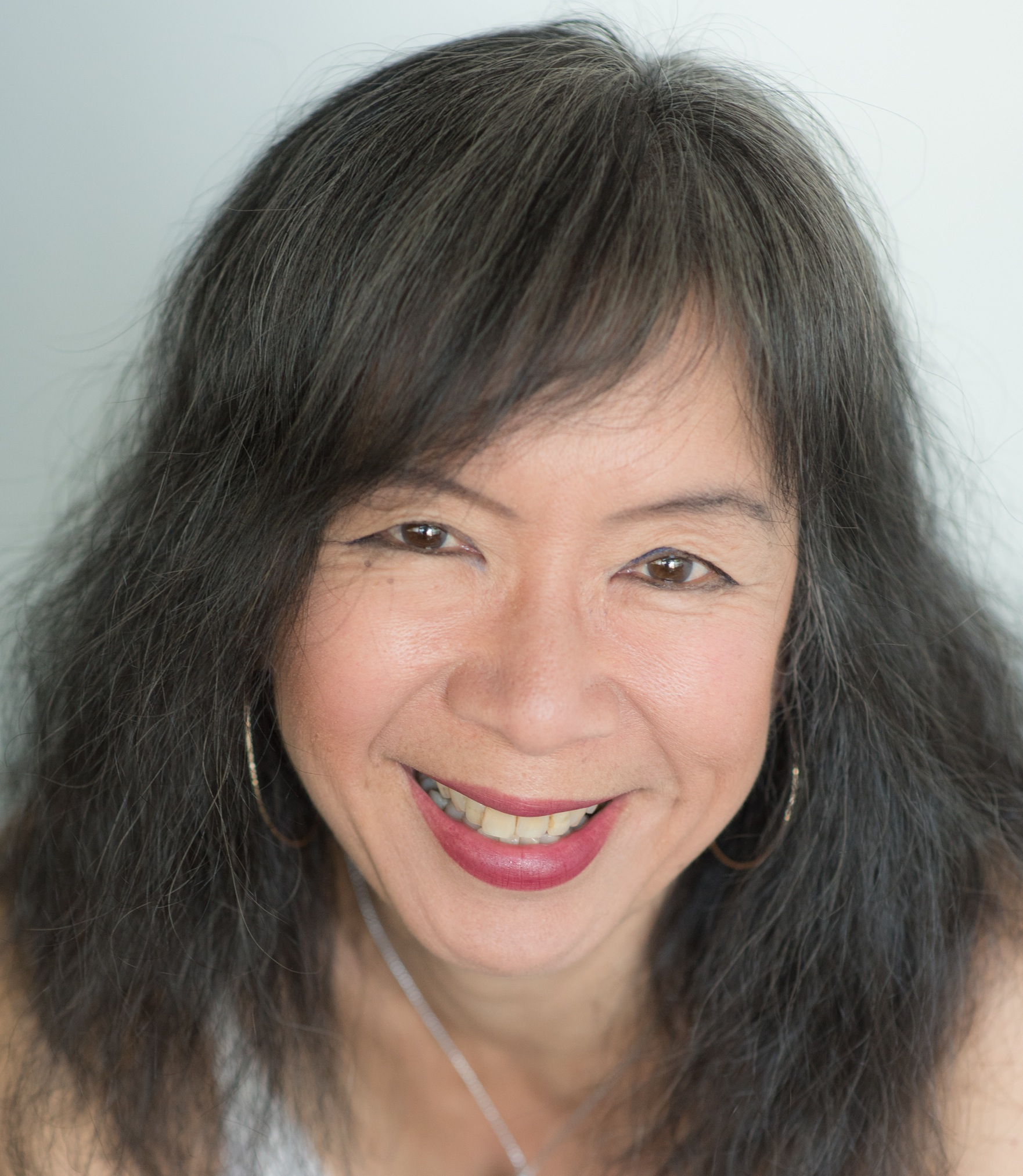
- Born: Vancouver, British Columbia, Canada
- Occupation: Filmmaker
- Website: www.karinlee.ca

Karin Lee is a Canadian filmmaker. She is an adjunct professor of film at the University of British Columbia. Her 2000 documentary, Made in China, won a Gemini Award.

== Biography ==
Lee was born and raised in Vancouver, British Columbia. She is a fourth generation Chinese Canadian, born to cultural activist parents. Her great-grandfather, Mah Bing Kee, was a Chinese labourer who immigrated to California in 1861 to work in the gold fields, then to Nanaimo, British Columbia, in 1878. Her father ran a communist bookstore on Hastings Street in Vancouver's Downtown Eastside from the 1960s to 1980s; she wrote and directed the short film Comrade Dad about the store.

With Lorraine Chan and the Chinese Cultural Centre of Vancouver, Lee co-founded the Chinese Film and Video Festival, which ran from 1994 through 1996.

Lee's documentary Made in China (2000) explores the lives of Chinese-born children adopted by Canadian families. A review in the Chicago Tribune described it as "thoughtful" and "engrossing". The film won the Canada Award at the 2001 Gemini Awards.

In 2018, SUM Gallery, run by Vancouver's Queer Arts Festival, featured her work in its debut exhibition, Karin Lee: QueerSUM 心. The exhibition included three films that examine facets of Asian Canadian activism. A review in Canadian Art noted Lee's aim to "normalize the non-linear narratives in the queer and feminist Chinese community and to propose how those lived experiences are still relevant today at the intersection of race, gender and sexuality."

In 2019, it was reported that Lee was working on a documentary about Velma Demerson, a white Canadian woman who was jailed for being in a relationship with a Chinese immigrant.

Lee is an adjunct professor of film at the University of British Columbia.
