= Duployan shorthand =

Shorthand writing system

Duployan shorthand 𛰜𛰃𛱇𛰚𛱄𛰊𛰋𛱁𛰄𛱆 𛰈𛱒𛰂𛰆𛱄𛱆𛱇
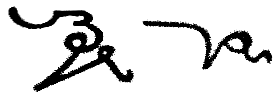
- The words "sténographie Duployé" in Duployan stenography
- Script type: light-line geometric stenographic alphabet
- Creator: Émile Duployé
- Published: 1868 (Pernin: 1877; Sloan: 1883; Ellis: 1888; LeJeune: 1891)
- Period: 1860 — present
- Status: historic and hobbyist usage
- Direction: Left-to-right
- Languages: French, English, German, Spanish, Romanian, Chinook Jargon, Lillooet, Thompson, Okanagan

Related scripts
- Child systems: Malone's Script Phonography

ISO 15924
- ISO 15924: Dupl (755), Duployan shorthand, Duployan stenography

Unicode
- Unicode alias: Duployan
- Unicode range: U+1BC00–U+1BC9F Duployan; U+1BCA0–U+1BCAF Shorthand Format Controls
- Adaptations: Pernin (+ reporters'), Perrault, Sloan-Duployan (+ reporters'), Romanian stenography, Duployan metagraphie, and Chinook writing

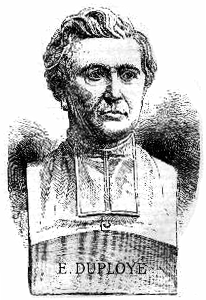
Émile Duployé

The Duployan shorthand, or Duployan stenography (French: Sténographie Duployé), is a shorthand writing system created by Father Émile Duployé in 1860 originally for writing French. Since then, it has been expanded and adapted for writing English, German, Spanish, Romanian, Latin, Danish, and Chinook Jargon. The Duployan stenography is classified as a geometric, alphabetic stenography and is written left-to-right in connected stenographic style. The Duployan shorthands, including Chinook writing, Pernin's Universal Phonography, Perrault's English Shorthand, the Sloan-Duployan Modern Shorthand, and Romanian stenography, were included as a single script in version 7.0 of the Unicode Standard / ISO 10646

== Typology and structure ==
Duployan is classified as a geometric stenography, in that the prototype for letterforms are based on lines and circles, instead of ellipses. It is alphabetic, with both consonant and vowel signs in equal prominence. Writing is in a left-to-right direction, proceeding down the page, as is common European writing. Most Duployan letters will attach to adjacent letters, allowing a word (or words) to be written in a single stroke, without lifting the pen.

=== Consonants ===
Consonant characters come in two basic styles: line consonants and arc consonants. All consonants have a shape, size, and stroke direction that do not change based on the surrounding characters. Both types of consonants are contrasted by orientation, length, and the presence of ancillary dots and dashes on or near the letter.

The line consonants come in five orientations: vertical, horizontal, left-to-right falling, left-to-right rising, and right-to-left falling; and in three lengths: short, long, and extended. Variations of some line consonants will have dots adjacent to the center of the line.

Arc consonants come in two arc lengths: half circle, and quarter circle. The half circle arcs have four orientations: left, right, top, and bottom half; and two lengths: regular and extended. Variations of the half circle arc consonants have dots inside and outside of the bowl, and dashes across the middle. The quarter arc consonants also have four orientations corresponding to the four quadrants of a circle, with both upwards and downwards strokes, and come in regular and extended lengths. The only variant quarter arc consonant is the addition of a dot (Duployan letter H) to the Duployan letter W to make the Duployan letter Wh.

=== Vowels ===
Vowels characters also come in two basic styles: circle vowels, and orienting vowels. Vowels have only a general shape and size, but their orientation and exact appearance are usually dictated by the adjacent characters.

Circle vowels are written by creating a loop that starts from the preceding character acting as a tangent, continuing around the circle until reaching the tangent point of the following character, at which point the following letterform is written, with the two adjacent characters crossing to complete the "circle". Variants of the circle vowels have dots in the middle of the circle, or a protuberance in from the circle. Circle vowels may also take standard diacritic marks when used to write some languages.

Some circle vowels

Orienting vowels are written by rotating the vowel to match the incoming angle of the preceding character, then mirrored along the axis of that character to avoid the following character crossing. They come in two varieties, defined by whether they will tend toward the right or left if the adjacent characters will allow either. Nasal vowels are considered a special case of an orienting vowel, and will act as orienting vowels, except in the Chinook script, where nasals can appear as diacritics.

=== Affixes and word signs ===
Many Duployan shorthands use small unattached marks, as well as various crossing and touching strokes, as markers for common prefixes and suffixes. Individual letters and letterlike symbols are also used in many Duployan shorthands to stand for common words and phrases. Overlapping two or more letters and signs can be used in some shorthands as word signs and abbreviations.

=== Ligatures ===
Most Duployan scripts do not make use of true ligatures that are not just one of its constituent letters with a distinguishing mark. The Romanian stenography is fairly unusual in having a number of vowel ligatures, especially with the Romanian U.

=== Connecting letters ===
Most Duployan letters cursively connect to any adjacent letters. Circle vowels will sometimes reduce to as small as a semi-circle in order to accommodate the incoming and outgoing strokes of adjacent letters, and orienting vowels will rotate to meet the preceding letter at a straight angle, while mirroring to present themselves to the following letter.

	+		+		=
P	+	A	+	T	=	pat
	+		+		=							* E would normally sit on the left side of P, except that it must sit on the right to join with the T.
P	+	E	+	T	=	pet						* E would normally sit on the left side of P, except that it must sit on the right to join with the T.
	+		+		+		=
J	+	A	+	I	+	N	=	shine
	+		+		+		+		+		=
P	+	E	+	Lh	+	T	+	E	+	N	=	pelten (Chinook)

== Alphabetical order ==
Duployan does not have a widely agreed alphabetical order. A precursory order for the alphabet was invented for the Unicode script proposal, however, and this order can basically be found in the order of the Unicode allocation (see Table of characters). This order places consonants before vowels, with similar type and size letters grouped roughly together.

== Table of characters ==
This table lists the characters used in all of the Duployan shorthands along with their Unicode code points. A basic alphabetization can be derived from the order of the letters. Letters with a name otherwise identical to a more universal letter will have a parenthetical denoting its shorthand of use: (Per) for Pernin's Universal Phonography, (Rom) for Romanian stenography, and (Sl) for Sloan-Duployan shorthand.

=== Spacing and line consonants ===
spacing consonants				short line consonants												
Code	Letter	Code	Letter	Code	Letter	Code	Letter	Code	Letter	Code	Letter	Code	Letter			
Name	Letter	Name	Letter	Name	Letter	Name	Letter	Name	Letter	Name	Letter	Name	Letter			
1BC00		1BC01		1BC02		1BC03		1BC04		1BC05		1BC06				
H		X		P		T		F		K		L				
long line consonants										extended line consonants						
1BC07		1BC08		1BC09		1BC0A		1BC0B		1BC0C		1BC0D		1BC0E	1BC0F	1BC10
B		D		V		G		R		PN		DS		FN	KM	RS
variant line consonants
1BC11		1BC12		1BC13		1BC14		1BC15		1BC16		1BC17		1BC18		
Th		Dh (Sl)		Dh		Kk		J (Sl)		hL		Lh		Rh		

=== Arc consonants ===
half arc consonants								half arc consonants (cross variants)								
Code	Letter	Code	Letter	Code	Letter	Code	Letter	Code	Letter	Code	Letter	Code	Letter	Code	Letter	
Name	Letter	Name	Letter	Name	Letter	Name	Letter	Name	Letter	Name	Letter	Name	Letter	Name	Letter	
1BC19		1BC1A		1BC1B		1BC1C		1BC1D		1BC1E		1BC1F		1BC20		
M		N		J		S		MN		NM		JM		SJ		
half arc consonants (dotted variants)												large variant half arc consonants				
1BC21		1BC22		1BC23		1BC24		1BC25		1BC26		1BC2F		1BC30		1BC31
M + dot		N + dot		J + dot		J + dots		S + dot		S + dot below		JS + dot		JN		JNS
large half arc consonants								large half arc consonants (cross variants)								
1BC27		1BC28		1BC29		1BC2A		1BC2B		1BC2C		1BC2D		1BC2E		
MS		NS		JS		SS		MNS		NMS		JMS		SJS		
downslope quarter arc consonants										large downslope quarter arc consonants						
1BC32		1BC33		1BC34		1BC35		1BC36		1BC37		1BC38		1BC39		1BC3A
ST		STR		SP		SPR		TS		TRS		W		Wh		WR
upslope quarter arc consonants						large upslope quarter arc consonants										
1BC3B		1BC3C		1BC3D		1BC3E		1BC3F		1BC40						
SN		SM		KRS		GRS		SK		SKR						

=== Vowels ===
circle vowels										I / E						
Code	Letter	Code	Letter	Code	Letter	Code	Letter	Code	Letter	Code	Letter	Code	Letter			
Name	Letter	Name	Letter	Name	Letter	Name	Letter	Name	Letter	Name	Letter	Name	Letter			
1BC41		1BC42		1BC43		1BC44		1BC45		1BC46		1BC47				
A		Ow (Sl)		OA		O		Aou		I		E				
non-orienting I/E variants								I/E variants								
1BC48		1BC49		1BC4A		1BC4B		1BC4C		1BC4D		1BC4E		1BC4F	1BC50	
Ie		short I		Ui		Ee		Eh (Sl)		I (Rom)		Ee (Sl)		Long I	Ye	
quarter circle vowels								Other 'U' vowels								
1BC51		1BC52		1BC53		1BC54		1BC55		1BC56		1BC57		1BC58	1BC59	
U		Eu		X^{w} / Uh		UN		Long U		U (Rom)		Uh		U (Sl)	Ooh	
dotted circle vowels				compound W-vowels												
1BC5A		1BC5B		1BC5C		1BC5D		1BC5E		1BC5F		1BC60				
Ow		Ou		Wa		Wo		Wi		Wei		Wow				
basic nasal vowels								variant nasal vowels								
1BC61		1BC62		1BC63		1BC64		1BC65		1BC66		1BC67		1BC68	1BC69	1BC6A
Un		On		In		An		An (Per)		Am (Per)		En (Sl)		An (Sl)	On (Sl)	uM

=== Affixes, marks, punctuation, and others ===
invariant attached affixes
Code	Affix	Code	Affix	Code	Affix	Code	Affix	Code	Affix	Code	Affix				
1BC70		1BC71		1BC72		1BC73		1BC74		1BC75					
orienting attached affixes
1BC76		1BC77		1BC78		1BC79		1BC7A		1BC7B		1BC7C			
high affixes
1BC80		1BC81		1BC82		1BC83		1BC84		1BC85		1BC86	1BC87	1BC88	
low affixes
1BC90		1BC91		1BC92		1BC93		1BC94		1BC95		1BC96	1BC97	1BC98	1BC99

Other marks and symbols
Code	Symbol	Code	Symbol	Code	Symbol
Name	Symbol	Name	Symbol	Name	Symbol
1BC9C		1BC9E		1BC9F	
Chinook Likalisti (eucharist) sign		Double Mark		Chinook punctuation mark	

Invisible Unicode format characters
Code	Name	Code	Name	Code	Name	Code	Name	Code	Name
1BC9D	Duployan Thick; Letter Selector	1BCA0	Shorthand Format; Letter Overlap	1BCA1	Shorthand Format; Continuing Overlap	1BCA2	Shorthand Format; Down Step	1BCA3	Shorthand Format; Up Step

== French Duployan ==
The use of French Duployan shorthand has historically been heavier in areas of southern France and Switzerland, with the Prévost-Delaunay and Aimé-Paris shorthands more common in northern France and the Paris area.

French Duployan makes use of an extensive list of letter words, combined consonants, and affix marks, but does not cross letters to make abbreviations. Like most European shorthands, French Duployan omits vowels that can be guessed by a fluent speaker.

== Chinook writing ==
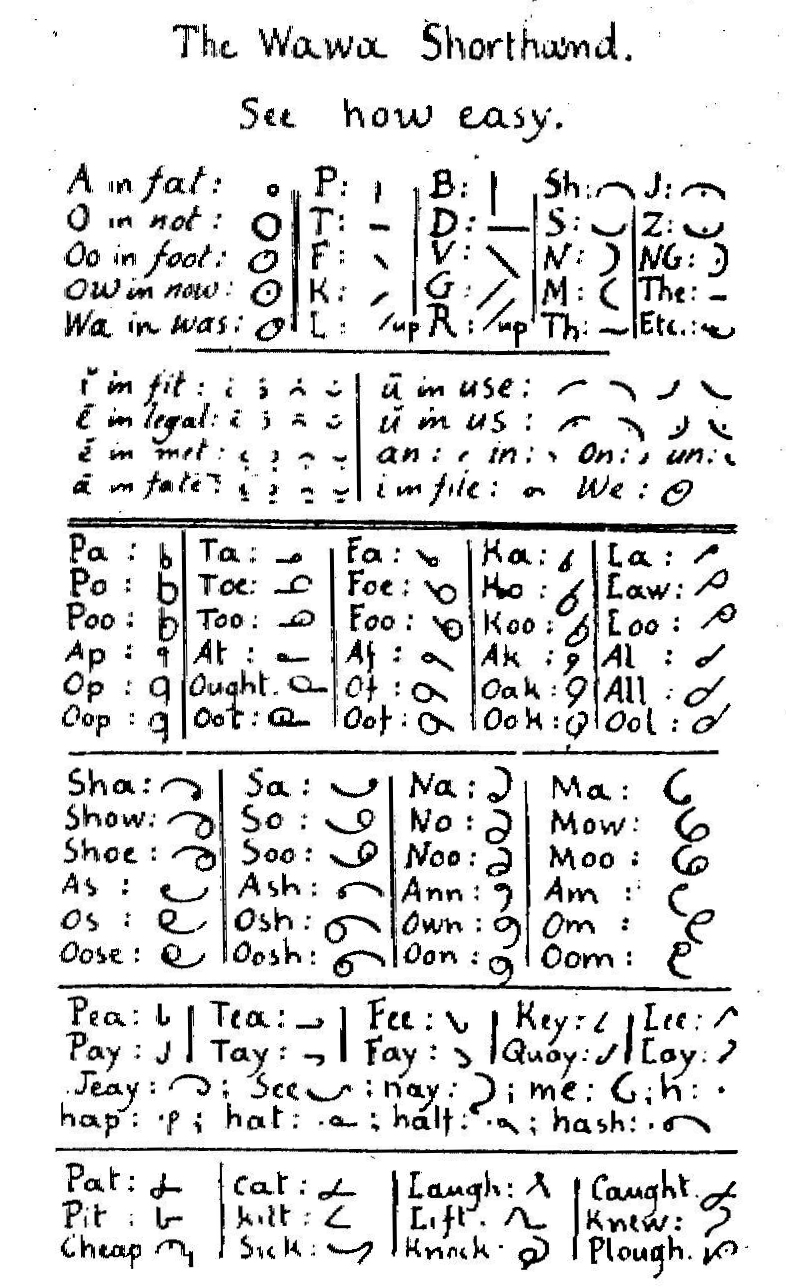
Introduction to the Wawa shorthand

The Chinook writing, Wawa shorthand, or Chinuk pipa, was developed by Father Jean-Marie-Raphaël Le Jeune in the early 1890s for writing in Chinook Jargon, Lillooet, Thompson, Okanagan, Latin, and English, with the intended purpose of bringing literacy and church teaching to the first nations in the Catholic Diocese of Kamloops. The result was three decades' publication of the Chinook Jargon language Kamloops Wawa.

The Chinook writing is notable by the absence of affixes and word signs, the phonological rigor – vowels were not omitted, even when predictable – and its use of W-vowels. Chinook writing is also notable in splitting a word into nominally syllabic units as well as using the only non-joining consonant characters in Duployan.

== Romanian stenography ==
The Romanian stenography was developed by Margaretta Sfințescu in the 1980s. Like French Duployan, Romanian stenography uses a large number of affix marks and word signs.

== English shorthands ==
Several adaptations of Duployan were developed for writing English, including those by Helen Pernin, J. Matthew Sloan, Denis Perrault, Carl Brandt, and George Galloway. The Pernin, Perrault, and Sloan shorthands are distinguished from other Duployan shorthands by the presence of the quarter-arc compound consonants. They also make use of affix marks, and omit redundant vowels. Galloway and Brandt shorthands are not included in the Duployan Unicode proposal.

Unlike other Duployan shorthands, Sloan-Duployan uses a thick, or heavy, stroke to indicate the addition of an "R" sound to a letter. Although not found in the other Duployan shorthands, contrastive thick and thin strokes are common in other shorthands, such as Pitman shorthand, where a heavy stroke would indicate a voiced consonant, and thin the unvoiced version of the same consonant.

== Unicode ==
Duployan shorthand was added to the Unicode Standard in June 2014 with the release of version 7.0.

Duployan^{[1]}^{[2]} Official Unicode Consortium code chart (PDF)
	0	1	2	3	4	5	6	7	8	9	A	B	C	D	E	F
U+1BC0x	𛰀	𛰁	𛰂	𛰃	𛰄	𛰅	𛰆	𛰇	𛰈	𛰉	𛰊	𛰋	𛰌	𛰍	𛰎	𛰏
U+1BC1x	𛰐	𛰑	𛰒	𛰓	𛰔	𛰕	𛰖	𛰗	𛰘	𛰙	𛰚	𛰛	𛰜	𛰝	𛰞	𛰟
U+1BC2x	𛰠	𛰡	𛰢	𛰣	𛰤	𛰥	𛰦	𛰧	𛰨	𛰩	𛰪	𛰫	𛰬	𛰭	𛰮	𛰯
U+1BC3x	𛰰	𛰱	𛰲	𛰳	𛰴	𛰵	𛰶	𛰷	𛰸	𛰹	𛰺	𛰻	𛰼	𛰽	𛰾	𛰿
U+1BC4x	𛱀	𛱁	𛱂	𛱃	𛱄	𛱅	𛱆	𛱇	𛱈	𛱉	𛱊	𛱋	𛱌	𛱍	𛱎	𛱏
U+1BC5x	𛱐	𛱑	𛱒	𛱓	𛱔	𛱕	𛱖	𛱗	𛱘	𛱙	𛱚	𛱛	𛱜	𛱝	𛱞	𛱟
U+1BC6x	𛱠	𛱡	𛱢	𛱣	𛱤	𛱥	𛱦	𛱧	𛱨	𛱩	𛱪					
U+1BC7x	𛱰	𛱱	𛱲	𛱳	𛱴	𛱵	𛱶	𛱷	𛱸	𛱹	𛱺	𛱻	𛱼			
U+1BC8x	𛲀	𛲁	𛲂	𛲃	𛲄	𛲅	𛲆	𛲇	𛲈							
U+1BC9x	𛲐	𛲑	𛲒	𛲓	𛲔	𛲕	𛲖	𛲗	𛲘	𛲙			𛲜	D T L S	𛲞	𛲟
Notes 1.As of Unicode version 18.0 2.Grey areas indicate non-assigned code points

Shorthand Format Controls^{[1]}^{[2]} Official Unicode Consortium code chart (PDF)
	0	1	2	3	4	5	6	7	8	9	A	B	C	D	E	F
U+1BCAx	𛲠	𛲡	𛲢	𛲣												
Notes 1.As of Unicode version 18.0 2.Grey areas indicate non-assigned code points

== See also ==
- duployan-font on GitHub – fonts for Duployan, and some other tools such as an online keyboard app
