= Pleyber-Christ =

Pleyber-Christ Pleiber-Krist
- Commune
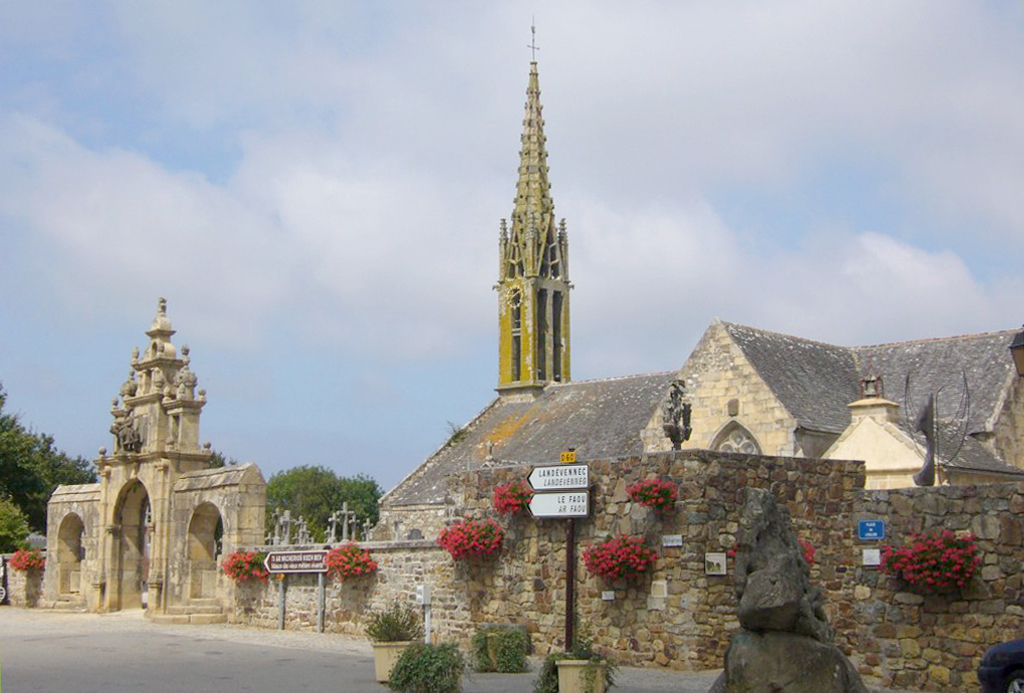
- Town square and parish close
- Location of Pleyber-Christ
- Location within France Location within Brittany
- Coordinates: 48°30′20″N 3°52′27″W
- Country: France
- Region: Brittany
- Department: Finistère
- Arrondissement: Morlaix
- Canton: Morlaix
- Intercommunality: Morlaix Communauté

Government
  - Mayor (2020–2026): Julien Kerguillec
- Area^{1}: 45.47 km^{2} (17.56 sq mi)
- Population (2023): 3,166
  - Density: 69.63/km^{2} (180.3/sq mi)
- Time zone: UTC+01:00 (CET)
  - Summer (DST): UTC+02:00 (CEST)
- INSEE/Postal code: 29163 /29410
- ^{1} French Land Register data, which excludes lakes, ponds, glaciers > 1 km^{2} (0.386 sq mi or 247 acres) and river estuaries.

Pleyber-Christ (French pronunciation: [plɛbɛʁ kʁist]; Breton: Pleiber-Krist) is a commune in the Finistère department of Brittany in north-western France.

== Geography ==
=== Climate ===
Pleyber-Christ has an oceanic climate (Köppen climate classification Cfb). The average annual temperature in Pleyber-Christ is 11.5 °C (52.7 °F). The average annual rainfall is 1,126.8 mm (44.36 in) with December as the wettest month. The temperatures are highest on average in August, at around 17.5 °C (63.5 °F), and lowest in January, at around 6.4 °C (43.5 °F). The highest temperature ever recorded in Pleyber-Christ was 37.1 °C (98.8 °F) on 9 August 2003; the coldest temperature ever recorded was −8.3 °C (17.1 °F) on 2 January 1997.

Climate data for Pleyber-Christ (1981–2010 averages, extremes 1994−present)
Month	Jan	Feb	Mar	Apr	May	Jun	Jul	Aug	Sep	Oct	Nov	Dec	Year
Record high °C (°F)	16.5 (61.7)	22.7 (72.9)	25.9 (78.6)	29.2 (84.6)	30.9 (87.6)	34.8 (94.6)	35.7 (96.3)	37.1 (98.8)	33.1 (91.6)	29.4 (84.9)	21.2 (70.2)	17.3 (63.1)	37.1 (98.8)
Mean daily maximum °C (°F)	8.9 (48.0)	9.8 (49.6)	11.8 (53.2)	13.8 (56.8)	17.0 (62.6)	20.1 (68.2)	21.7 (71.1)	22.1 (71.8)	19.8 (67.6)	16.2 (61.2)	12.0 (53.6)	9.2 (48.6)	15.2 (59.4)
Daily mean °C (°F)	6.4 (43.5)	6.9 (44.4)	8.3 (46.9)	9.7 (49.5)	12.7 (54.9)	15.5 (59.9)	17.2 (63.0)	17.5 (63.5)	15.4 (59.7)	12.8 (55.0)	9.2 (48.6)	6.6 (43.9)	11.5 (52.7)
Mean daily minimum °C (°F)	3.8 (38.8)	4.0 (39.2)	4.8 (40.6)	5.6 (42.1)	8.4 (47.1)	10.9 (51.6)	12.7 (54.9)	13.0 (55.4)	11.0 (51.8)	9.4 (48.9)	6.4 (43.5)	3.9 (39.0)	7.8 (46.0)
Record low °C (°F)	−8.3 (17.1)	−7.6 (18.3)	−4.6 (23.7)	−2.2 (28.0)	−1.0 (30.2)	3.5 (38.3)	5.7 (42.3)	5.3 (41.5)	3.1 (37.6)	−2.5 (27.5)	−4.6 (23.7)	−6.7 (19.9)	−8.3 (17.1)
Average precipitation mm (inches)	130.6 (5.14)	110.6 (4.35)	88.7 (3.49)	85.9 (3.38)	79.4 (3.13)	54.6 (2.15)	64.9 (2.56)	62.4 (2.46)	73.4 (2.89)	108.5 (4.27)	130.9 (5.15)	136.9 (5.39)	1,126.8 (44.36)
Average precipitation days (≥ 1.0 mm)	17.1	14.8	14.1	13.1	12.2	8.4	11.3	10.7	10.5	15.4	18.1	16.4	161.9
Source: Meteociel

== Population ==
Inhabitants of Pleyber-Christ are called in French Pleybériens.

Historical population

Year	Pop.	±% p.a.
1793	2,806	—
1800	3,023	+1.07%
1806	2,891	−0.74%
1821	3,017	+0.28%
1831	3,087	+0.23%
1836	3,062	−0.16%
1841	3,133	+0.46%
1846	3,166	+0.21%
1851	3,292	+0.78%
1856	3,430	+0.82%
1861	3,221	−1.25%
1866	3,393	+1.05%
1872	3,468	+0.37%
1876	3,454	−0.10%
1881	3,412	−0.24%
1886	3,319	−0.55%
1891	3,351	+0.19%
1896	3,238	−0.68%
1901	3,028	−1.33%

Year	Pop.	±% p.a.
1906	2,968	−0.40%
1911	2,894	−0.50%
1921	2,797	−0.34%
1926	2,613	−1.35%
1931	2,384	−1.82%
1936	2,298	−0.73%
1946	2,191	−0.48%
1954	2,093	−0.57%
1962	2,157	+0.38%
1968	2,187	+0.23%
1975	2,525	+2.07%
1982	2,812	+1.55%
1990	2,828	+0.07%
1999	2,790	−0.15%
2007	3,057	+1.15%
2012	3,083	+0.17%
2017	3,139	+0.36%
2023	3,166	+0.14%

Source: EHESS and INSEE (1968-2023)

== Breton language ==
In 2008, 7.05% of primary-school children attended bilingual schools, where Breton language is taught alongside French.[1]

== Twinning ==
Pleyber-Christ was twinned with Lostwithiel in Cornwall, UK in 1979. The people in the Twinning Associations of both towns usually meet up every year, alternating between Lostwithiel and Pleyber-Christ.

== See also ==
- Communes of the Finistère department
- Roland Doré sculptor
- Pleyber-Christ Parish close
