= Tony Johnson (Chinook) =

Tony Johnson is the former Education Director of the Shoalwater Bay Indian Tribe, current Chairman of the Chinook Indian Nation (CIN), and a teacher of the Pacific Northwest trade language Chinuk Wawa. Johnson was born in South Bend, Washington, and now lives in Willapa Bay, Washington with his wife and children. He went to the University of Washington and Central Washington University to study Art and Anthropology. Tony Johnson has been a part of the Chinook nation's Cultural Committee for over two decades. His father, Gary Johnson, is a member of the Culture Committee and the Chinook Tribal Council. Johnson was named Oregon Indian Educator of the year in 2008.

The Burke Museum of Natural History and Culture houses a collection of bronze Columbia River paddles designed by Johnson and fellow artist Adam McIsaac. This sculpture was first unveiled in 2020.

== Recent ==
Johnson acts as the leader of the 3,000 tribal members and is a descendent of Oskalawiliksh, who signed a treaty in 1851. First elected in 2014, Johnson has since been fighting for federal recognition of treaties to preserve CIN land residency, fishing, and property rights. He also serves as a skipper for the Chinook Indian Nation during Tribal Canoe Journeys, an annual even celebrated by Indigenous peoples of the Pacific Northwest Coast.
