= Shorthand Format Controls =

- Range: U+1BCA0..U+1BCAF (16 code points)
- Plane: SMP
- Scripts: Common
- Major alphabets: Shorthands
- Assigned: 4 code points
- Unused: 12 reserved code points

Unicode version history
- 7.0 (2014): 4 (+4)

Unicode documentation
- Code chart ∣ Web page

Shorthand Format Controls is a Unicode block containing four formatting characters for representing shorthands in Unicode.

== Block ==
Shorthand Format Controls^{[1]}^{[2]} Official Unicode Consortium code chart (PDF)
| | 0 | 1 | 2 | 3 | 4 | 5 | 6 | 7 | 8 | 9 | A | B | C | D | E | F |
| U+1BCAx | 𛲠 | 𛲡 | 𛲢 | 𛲣 | | | | | | | | | | | | |
Notes: 1. As of Unicode version 17.0; 2. Grey areas indicate non-assigned code points

Being invisible controls, they have no visible glyph but can have a representation.

- U+1BCA0 𛲠 SHORTHAND FORMAT LETTER OVERLAP
- U+1BCA1 𛲡 SHORTHAND FORMAT CONTINUING OVERLAP
- U+1BCA2 𛲢 SHORTHAND FORMAT DOWN STEP

Romanian affix -tsion-
Sloan contracted ending oo/o + ZWSP

- U+1BCA3 𛲣 SHORTHAND FORMAT UP STEP

Sloan contracted ending uh/au/aui + ZWSP

== History ==
The following Unicode-related documents record the purpose and process of defining specific characters in the Shorthand Format Controls block:

| Version | Final code points (Note: Proposed code points and characters names may differ from final code points and names) | Count | L2 ID | WG2 ID | Document |
|---|---|---|---|---|---|
| 7.0 | U+1BCA0..1BCA3 | 4 | L2/09-184 | | Anderson, Van (2009-05-03), Proposal to include Chinook Pipa script in UCS |
| 7.0 | U+1BCA0..1BCA3 | 4 | L2/09-184.1 | | Anderson, Van (2009-05-03), Proposal to include Chinook Pipa script in UCS [zip format of the HTML version] |
| 7.0 | U+1BCA0..1BCA3 | 4 | L2/09-283 | | Anderson, Van (2009-07-24), Proposal to include Chinook Pipa script in UCS |
| 7.0 | U+1BCA0..1BCA3 | 4 | L2/09-364 | | Anderson, Van (2009-10-06), Proposal to Include Duployan Shorthands and Chinook Script in UCS |
| 7.0 | U+1BCA0..1BCA3 | 4 | L2/09-364.1 | | Anderson, Van (2009-10-06), Proposal to Include Duployan Shorthands and Chinook Script in UCS [zip format of the HTML version] |
| 7.0 | U+1BCA0..1BCA3 | 4 | L2/09-364.2 | | Anderson, Van (2009-10-26), Proposal to Include Duployan Shorthands and Chinook Script in UCS [fonts and data] |
| 7.0 | U+1BCA0..1BCA3 | 4 | L2/10-027 | | Anderson, Van (2010-01-25), Duployan Charts |
| 7.0 | U+1BCA0..1BCA3 | 4 | L2/10-028 | | Anderson, Van (2010-01-25), Duployan Documentation |
| 7.0 | U+1BCA0..1BCA3 | 4 | L2/10-026 | | Anderson, Van (2010-01-31), Proposal to include Duployan Shorthands and Chinook script in UCS |
| 7.0 | U+1BCA0..1BCA3 | 4 | L2/10-159 | | Anderson, Van (2010-05-03), Proposal to include Duployan Shorthands and Chinook script in UCS |
| 7.0 | U+1BCA0..1BCA3 | 4 | L2/10-201 | | Anderson, Van (2010-05-12), Guide to Duployan Shorthands and Stenographies |
| 7.0 | U+1BCA0..1BCA3 | 4 | L2/10-202 | | Anderson, Van (2010-05-12), Duployan Texts |
| 7.0 | U+1BCA0..1BCA3 | 4 | L2/10-272R2 | N3895 | Anderson, Van (2010-08-12), Proposal to include Duployan Shorthands and Chinook script and Shorthand Format Controls in UCS |
| 7.0 | U+1BCA0..1BCA3 | 4 | L2/10-221 | | Moore, Lisa (2010-08-23), "C.21", UTC #124 / L2 #221 Minutes |
| 7.0 | U+1BCA0..1BCA3 | 4 | L2/10-347 | N3908 | Everson, Michael (2010-09-21), On ordering and the proposed Duployan script for shorthands and Chinook |
| 7.0 | U+1BCA0..1BCA3 | 4 | L2/10-352 | N3922 | Anderson, Van (2010-09-21), Response to Irish NB comments N3908 |
| 7.0 | U+1BCA0..1BCA3 | 4 | L2/10-364 | N3931 | Everson, Michael (2010-10-03), Further discussion on ordering and the proposed Duployan script |
| 7.0 | U+1BCA0..1BCA3 | 4 | L2/10-383 | N3940 | Anderson, Van (2010-10-05), Quick response to Irish NB comments N3931 |
| 7.0 | U+1BCA0..1BCA3 | 4 | L2/11-215 | N4088 | Anderson, Van; Everson, Michael (2011-05-30), Resolving chart and collation order for the Duployan script |
| 7.0 | U+1BCA0..1BCA3 | 4 | L2/11-303 | | Anderson, Van (2011-07-19), Proposal to include Duployan Shorthands and Chinook script and Shorthand Format Controls in UCS, as approved by WG2 |
| 7.0 | U+1BCA0..1BCA3 | 4 | | N4103 | "11.1.5 Duployan Shorthands and Chinook script and Shorthand Format Controls in UCS", Unconfirmed minutes of WG 2 meeting 58, 2012-01-03 |
| 7.0 | U+1BCA0..1BCA3 | 4 | L2/14-134 | | Davis, Mark (2014-05-05), Fix to Script=Inherited values |
| 7.0 | U+1BCA0..1BCA3 | 4 | L2/14-100 | | Moore, Lisa (2014-05-13), "B.14.3", UTC #139 Minutes |

== See also ==
- Duployan shorthand
