= Regularized Inglish =

Revised English spelling system

Regularized Inglish is a revised English spelling system devised and advocated by Swedish linguist Axel Wijk, set out in his 1959 book Regularized English: An investigation into the English spelling reform problem with a new, detailed plan for a possible solution. Wijk's spelling system is moderate compared to other 20th century reforms. Instead of replacing current English spelling with, for example, a fully phonetic notation, Wijk's aim was to replace "inconsistencies with more regular equivalents." Furthermore, certain inconsistencies such as the use of ⟨g⟩ for two separate consonant sounds (as in gent and goat) are preserved, as are ⟨k⟩, ⟨c⟩ and ⟨qu⟩ for /k/ and ⟨c⟩ and ⟨s⟩ for /s/. The digraph ⟨ph⟩ is abandoned, but ⟨gh⟩ is preserved where used silently: thus high but not rough. Consequently, Regularized Inglish agrees with 90-95% of words spelled using the current English spelling system.

Wijk proposed that there should be a separate American and English standard orthography, each based on "the dialect of its cultivated circles". However, he felt that this variation should not be extended to English regional varieties.

== Example text ==
The following is a version of the story of Dick Whittington written by Wijk and slightly simplified and Americanized by John Cowan:

Wunce upon a time thare livd a poor boy named Dick Whittington, hooze faather and muther were bothe ded. Having neether home nor frends, he roamed about the cuntry trying to ern hiz living. Sumtimes he cood not finde any wurk, and he offen had to go hungry.

On market days he herd the farmers tauk about the greit city of Lundon. They sed that its streets were paved with gold. So Dick made up hiz minde to go to Lundon and seek hiz fortune. Packing hiz clothes into a bundle and cauling hiz faithful cat he started out. After days and days ov wauking, the hungry lad finally reached Lundon.

== See also ==
- English Spelling Society
- List of reforms of the English language
- Cut Spelling
- Handbook of Simplified Spelling
- SoundSpel
- SR1
- Traditional Spelling Revised
