= English-language spelling reform =

Proposals to phoneticise English spelling

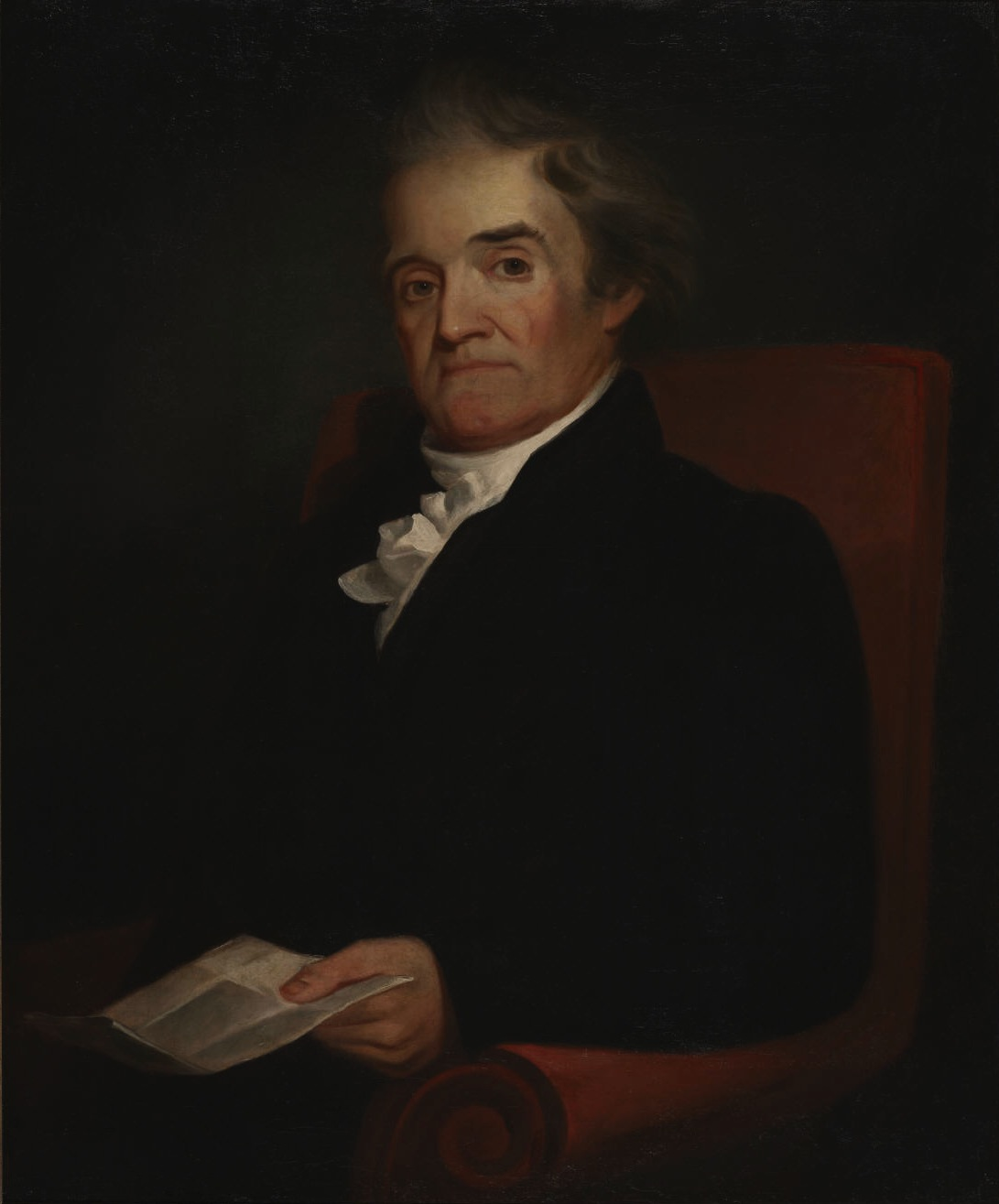
Noah Webster's reforms to American spelling are the most successful to date.

Many proposals have been made to change the system of English orthography with the aim of making it more consistent and closer to the spoken language. Common motives for spelling reform include making learning quicker and cheaper, thereby making English more useful as an international language.

Reform proposals vary widely in the scope and depth of their changes. While some aim to uniformly follow the alphabetic principle (occasionally by creating new alphabets), others merely suggest changing a few common words. Conservative proposals try to improve the existing system by using the traditional English alphabet, maintaining the familiar shapes of words and applying existing conventions more regularly (such as silent e). More radical proposals might completely restructure the look and feel of the system. Some reformers prefer a gradual change implemented in stages, while others favor an immediate and total reform for all.

Some spelling reform proposals have been adopted partially or temporarily. Many of the spellings preferred by Noah Webster have become standard in the United States, but have not been adopted elsewhere (see American and British English spelling differences).

== History ==
Modern English spelling developed from about 1350 onwards, when—after three centuries of Norman French rule—English gradually became the official language of England again, although very different from before 1066, having incorporated many words of French origin (channel, tenor, royal, etc.). Early writers of this new English, such as Geoffrey Chaucer, gave it a fairly consistent spelling system, but this was soon diluted by Chancery clerks who respelled words based on French orthography. English spelling consistency was further reduced when William Caxton brought the printing press to London in 1476. Having lived in mainland Europe for the preceding 30 years, his grasp of the English spelling system had become uncertain. The Flemish assistants whom he brought to help him set up his business had an even poorer command of it.

As printing developed, printers began to develop individual preferences or "house styles". Furthermore, typesetters were paid by the line and were fond of making words longer. However, the biggest change in English spelling consistency occurred between 1525, when William Tyndale first translated the New Testament, and 1539, when King Henry VIII legalized the printing of English Bibles in England. The many editions of these Bibles were all printed outside England by people who spoke little or no English. They often changed spellings to match their Dutch orthography. Examples include the silent h in ghost (to match Dutch gheest, which later became geest), aghast, ghastly and gherkin. The silent h in other words—such as ghospel, ghossip and ghizzard—was later removed.

There have been two periods when spelling reform of the English language has attracted particular interest.

=== 16th and 17th centuries ===
The first of these periods was from the mid-16th to the mid-17th centuries, when a number of publications outlining proposals for reform were published. Some of them are detailed below:

- Gospel according to Saint Matthew in 1550 by John Cheke.
- De recta et emendata linguæ angliæ scriptione (On the Rectified and Amended Written English Language) in 1568 by Sir Thomas Smith, secretary of state to Edward VI and Elizabeth I.
- An Orthographie in 1569 by John Hart, Chester Herald.
- Booke at Large for the Amendment of English Orthographie in 1580 by William Bullokar.
- Logonomia Anglica in 1621 by Alexander Gill, headmaster of St Paul's School in London.
- English Grammar in 1634 by Charles Butler, vicar of Wootton St Lawrence.

These proposals generally did not attract serious consideration because they were too radical or were based on an insufficient understanding of the phonology of English. However, more conservative proposals were more successful. James Howell in his Grammar of 1662 recommended minor changes to spelling, such as changing logique to logic, warre to war, sinne to sin, toune to town and tru to true. Many of these spellings are now in general use.

From the 16th century onward, English writers who were scholars of Greek and Latin literature tried to link English words to their Graeco-Latin counterparts. They did this by adding silent letters to make the real or imagined links more obvious. Thus det became debt (to link it to Latin debitum), dout became doubt (to link it to Latin dubitare), sissors became scissors and sithe became scythe (as they were wrongly thought to come from Latin scindere), iland became island (as it was wrongly thought to come from Latin insula), ake became ache (as it was wrongly thought to come from Greek akhos), and so forth.

William Shakespeare satirized the disparity between English spelling and pronunciation. In his play Love's Labour's Lost, the character Holofernes is "a pedant" who insists that pronunciation should change to match spelling, rather than simply changing spelling to match pronunciation. For example, Holofernes insists that everyone should pronounce the unhistorical B in words like doubt and debt.

=== 19th century ===
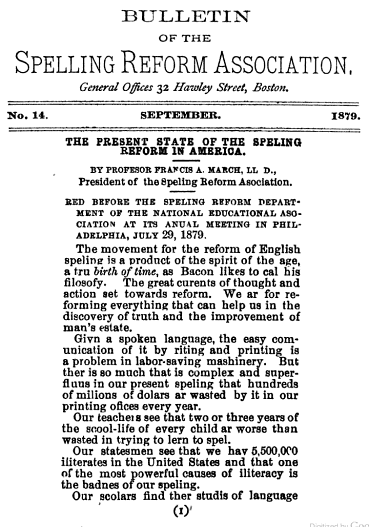
An 1879 bulletin by the US Spelling Reform Association, written mostly using reformed spellings

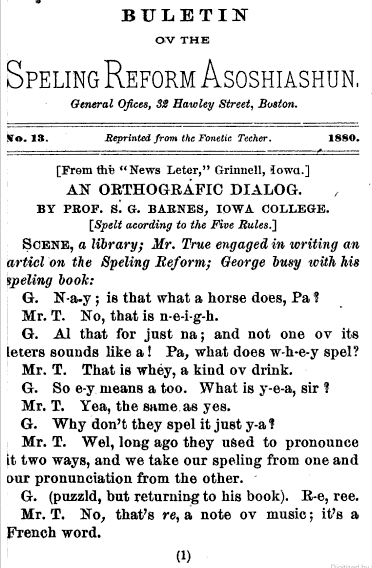
An 1880 bulletin, written wholly in reformed spelling

The second period started in the 19th century and appears to coincide with the development of phonetics as a science. In 1806, Noah Webster published his first dictionary, A Compendious Dictionary of the English Language. It included an essay on the oddities of modern orthography and his proposals for reform. Many of the spellings he used, such as color and center, would become hallmarks of American English. In 1807, Webster began compiling an expanded dictionary. It was published in 1828 as An American Dictionary of the English Language. Although it drew some protest, the reformed spellings were gradually adopted throughout the United States.

In 1837, Isaac Pitman published his system of phonetic shorthand, while in 1848 Alexander John Ellis published A Plea for Phonetic Spelling. These were proposals for a new phonetic alphabet. Although unsuccessful, they drew widespread interest.

By the 1870s, the philological societies of Great Britain and the United States chose to consider the matter. After the "International Convention for the Amendment of English Orthography" that was held in Philadelphia in August 1876, societies were founded such as the English Spelling Reform Association and American Spelling Reform Association. That year, the American Philological Society adopted a list of eleven reformed spellings for immediate use. These were are→ar, give→giv, have→hav, live→liv, though→tho, through→thru, guard→gard, catalogue→catalog, (in)definite→(in)definit, wished→wisht. One major American newspaper that began using reformed spellings was the Chicago Tribune, whose editor and owner, Joseph Medill, sat on the Council of the Spelling Reform Association. In 1883, the American Philological Society and American Philological Association worked together to produce 24 spelling reform rules, which were published that year. In 1898, the American National Education Association adopted its own list of 12 words to be used in all writings: tho, altho, thoro, thorofare, thru, thruout, catalog, decalog, demagog, pedagog, prolog, program.

=== 20th century onward ===
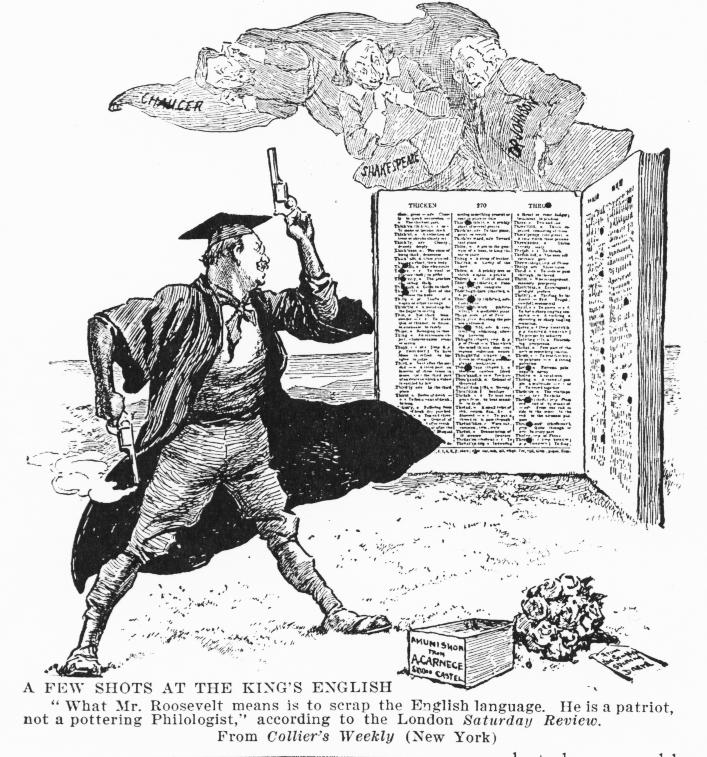
President Theodore Roosevelt was criticized for supporting the simplified spelling campaign of Andrew Carnegie in 1906.

The Simplified Spelling Board was founded in the United States in 1906. The SSB's original 30 members consisted of authors, professors and dictionary editors. Andrew Carnegie, a founding member, supported the SSB with yearly bequests of more than US$300,000. In April 1906, it published a list of 300 words, which included 157 spellings that were already in common use in American English. In August 1906, the SSB word list was adopted by Theodore Roosevelt, who ordered the Government Printing Office to start using them immediately. However, in December 1906, the U.S. Congress passed a resolution and the old spellings were reintroduced. Nevertheless, some of the spellings survived and are commonly used in American English today, such as anaemia/anæmia→anemia and mould→mold. Others such as mixed→mixt and scythe→sithe did not survive. In 1920, the SSB published its Handbook of Simplified Spelling, which set forth over 25 spelling reform rules. The handbook noted that every reformed spelling now in general use was originally the overt act of a lone writer, who was followed at first by a small minority. Thus, it encouraged people to "point the way" and "set the example" by using the reformed spellings whenever they could. However, with its main source of funds cut off, the SSB disbanded later that year.

In Britain, spelling reform was promoted from 1908 by the Simplified Spelling Society and attracted a number of prominent supporters. One of these was George Bernard Shaw (author of Pygmalion) and much of his considerable will was left to the cause. Among members of the society, the conditions of his will (the Shavian alphabet) gave rise to major disagreements, which hindered the development of a single new system.

Between 1934 and 1975, the Chicago Tribune, then Chicago's biggest newspaper, used a number of reformed spellings. Over a two-month spell in 1934, it introduced 80 respelled words, including tho, thru, thoro, agast, burocrat, frate, harth, herse, iland, rime, staf and telegraf. A March 1934 editorial reported that two-thirds of readers preferred the reformed spellings. Another claimed that "prejudice and competition" was preventing dictionary makers from listing such spellings. Over the next 40 years, however, the newspaper gradually phased out the respelled words. Until the 1950s, Funk & Wagnalls dictionaries listed many reformed spellings, including the SSB's 300, alongside the conventional spellings.

In 1949, a British Labour MP, Mont Follick, introduced a private member's bill in the House of Commons, which failed at the second reading. In 1953, he again had the opportunity, and this time it passed the second reading by 65 votes to 53. Because of anticipated opposition from the House of Lords, the bill was withdrawn after assurances from the minister of education that research would be undertaken into improving spelling education. In 1961, this led to James Pitman's Initial Teaching Alphabet, introduced into many British schools in an attempt to improve child literacy. Although it succeeded in its own terms, the advantages were lost when children transferred to conventional spelling. After several decades, the experiment was discontinued.

In his 1969 book Spelling Reform: A New Approach, the Australian linguist Harry Lindgren proposed a step-by-step reform. The first, Spelling Reform 1 (SR1), called for the short /ɛ/ sound (as in bet) to always be spelled with <e> (for example friend→frend, head→hed). This reform had some popularity in Australia.

In 2013, University of Oxford Professor of English Simon Horobin proposed that variety in spelling be acceptable. For example, he believes that it does not matter whether words such as "accommodate" and "tomorrow" are spelled with double letters. This proposal does not fit within the definition of spelling reform used by, for example, Random House Dictionary.

== Arguments for reform ==
Proponents of spelling reform such as the English Spelling Society argue that it would make English easier to learn to read, to spell, and to pronounce, as well as making it more useful for international communication and reducing educational costs (by reducing remediation costs and literacy teachers and programs), therefore enabling teachers and learners to spend more time on more important subjects or expanding subjects.

Another argument is the sheer amount of resources that are wasted using the current spelling. For example, the Cut Spelling system of spelling reform uses up to 15% fewer letters than current spelling. Books written with cut spelling could be printed on fewer pages, conserving resources such as paper and ink, a principle which extends to all forms and mediums of writing.

English spelling reforms have taken place already, just slowly and largely unorganized. Many words that were once spelled un-phonetically have since been reformed. For example, music was spelled musick until the 1880s, and fantasy was spelled phantasy until the 1920s. Almost all words with the -or ending (such as error) or the -er ending (such as member) were once spelled -our (errour) and -re (membre) respectively, though this change did not happen as completely in British spelling as it did in American spelling.

Since Samuel Johnson prescribed how words ought to be spelled in his 1755 dictionary, hundreds of thousands of words (as extrapolated from Masha Bell's research on 7000 common words) have shifted so that their spelling does not reflect their pronunciation, and the alphabetic principle in English has gradually been corrupted, since English spelling has not changed with these changes in pronunciation.

Reduced spelling is currently practiced on informal internet platforms and is common in text messaging.

The way vowel letters are used in English spelling vastly contradicts their usual meanings. For example, ⟨o⟩, expected to represent [əʊ] or [oʊ], may stand for [ʌ], while ⟨u⟩, expected to represent [ʌ], may represent [juː]. This makes English spelling even less intuitive for foreign learners than it is for native speakers, which is of importance for an international auxiliary language.

=== Ambiguity ===
Unlike many other languages, English spelling has never been systematically updated and thus today only partly holds to the alphabetic principle. As an outcome, English spelling is a system of weak rules with many exceptions and ambiguities.

Most phonemes in English can be spelled in more than one way. E.g. the words fear and peer contain the same sound in different spellings. Likewise, many graphemes in English have multiple pronunciations and decodings, such as ough in words like through, though, thought, thorough, tough, trough, and plough. There are 13 ways of spelling the schwa (the most common of all phonemes in English), 12 ways to spell /ei/ and 11 ways to spell /ɛ/. These kinds of incoherences can be found throughout the English lexicon and they even vary between dialects. Masha Bell has analyzed 7000 common words and found that about 1/2 cause spelling and pronunciation difficulties and about 1/3 cause decoding difficulties.

Such ambiguity is particularly problematic in the case of heteronyms (homographs with different pronunciations that vary with meaning), such as bow, desert, live, read, tear, wind, and wound. In reading such words one must consider the context in which they are used, and this increases the difficulty of learning to read and pronounce English.

A closer relationship between phonemes and spellings would eliminate many exceptions and ambiguities, making the language easier and faster to master.

=== Previous alterations ===
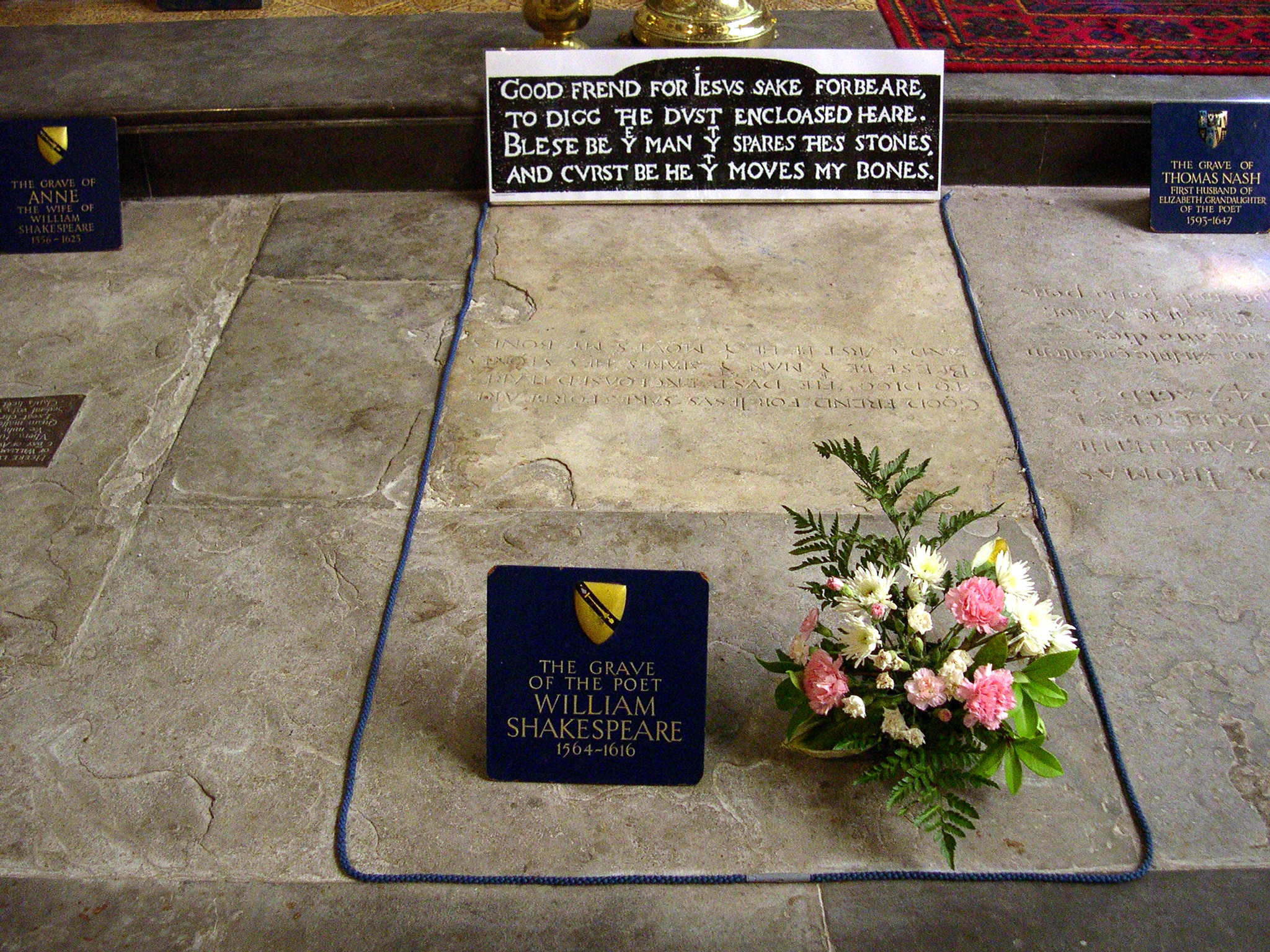
The epitaph on the grave of William Shakespeare spells friend as frend.

Some proposed simplified spellings already exist as standard or variant spellings in old literature. As noted earlier, in the 16th century, some scholars of Greek and Latin literature tried to make English words look more like their Graeco-Latin counterparts, at times even erroneously. They did this by adding silent letters, so det became debt, dout became doubt, sithe became scythe, iland became island, ake became ache, and so on. Some spelling reformers propose undoing these changes.

Other examples of older spellings that are more phonetic include frend for friend (as on Shakespeare's grave), agenst for against, yeeld for yield, bild for build, cort for court, sted for stead, delite for delight, gost for ghost, harth for hearth, rime for rhyme, sum for some and tung for tongue. It was also once common to use -t for the ending -ed in every case where it is pronounced as such (for example dropt for dropped), and this is still common in some British English spellings.

Some of the English language's most celebrated writers and poets have used these spellings and others proposed by today's spelling reformers. Edmund Spenser, for example, used spellings such as rize, wize, and advize in his famous poem The Faerie Queene, published in the 1590s.

=== Redundant letters ===
Because of its long history of loaning spellings from other languages, the English alphabet has several letters whose characteristic sounds can be represented by other letters or digraphs. These include:

- "x" (/ks/, /gz/, or /z/), which can be realised as "ks", "gz", or "z".
- "f" (/f/), which can be spelled "ph".
- "soft g" (/d͡ʒ/), which can be spelled "j".
- "c" (/k/ or /s/), which can be spelled "k" or "s".
- "q" (/k/), which can be spelled "k" or "c", though since it is nearly always followed by "u" (/w/), it is often suggested that the "u" be respelled to "w" too.

== Arguments against reform ==
Spelling reform faces many arguments against the development and implementation of a reformed orthography for English. Public acceptance to spelling reform has been consistently low since at least the early 19th century, when Noah Webster's reforms were put into place (1806).

The irregular spelling of very common words such as are, have, done, of, would makes it difficult to alter them without introducing a noticeable change to the appearance of English text.

English has borrowed many words from other languages without changing their spellings. These unchanged spellings can give an indication of the origin, meaning, or original pronunciation of the word (e.g. ocean, French océan; occasion, French occasion). Preservations in spelling also cause English words to occasionally resemble their cognates in other Germanic languages (e.g. light, German Licht; knight, German Knecht). Critics argue that re-spelling such words could hide these links.

A reform may favor one dialect or pronunciation over others, creating a standard language. Some words have more than one acceptable pronunciation, regardless of dialect (e.g. economic, either). Some distinctions in regional accents are still marked in spelling. Examples include the distinguishing of fern, fir and fur that is maintained in Irish and Scottish English or the distinction between toe and tow that is maintained in a few regional dialects in England and Wales. The current system has allophonic variation in some letters, such the letter a in bath alternatively representing /æ/ or /ɑ/ depending on the speaker's accent.

Some words are distinguished only by non-phonetic spelling (as in knight and night).

== Spelling reform proposals ==
Most spelling reforms attempt to improve phonemic representation, but some attempt genuine phonetic spelling, usually by changing the basic English alphabet or making a new one. All spelling reforms aim for greater regularity in spelling.

=== Using the basic English alphabet ===
- Cut Spelling - typically deletes silent or redundant letters.
- Handbook of Simplified Spelling - a few dozen rules, applied gradually over time.
- Regularized Inglish - wide regularization of the sounds of the alphabet, with corresponding respellings.
- SoundSpel - wide phonemic reform.
- Spelling Reform 1 (SR1) - focuses on only one phonemic rule.
- Traditional Spelling Revised (TSR) - seeks to apply English rules more consistently.

=== Extending or replacing the basic English alphabet ===
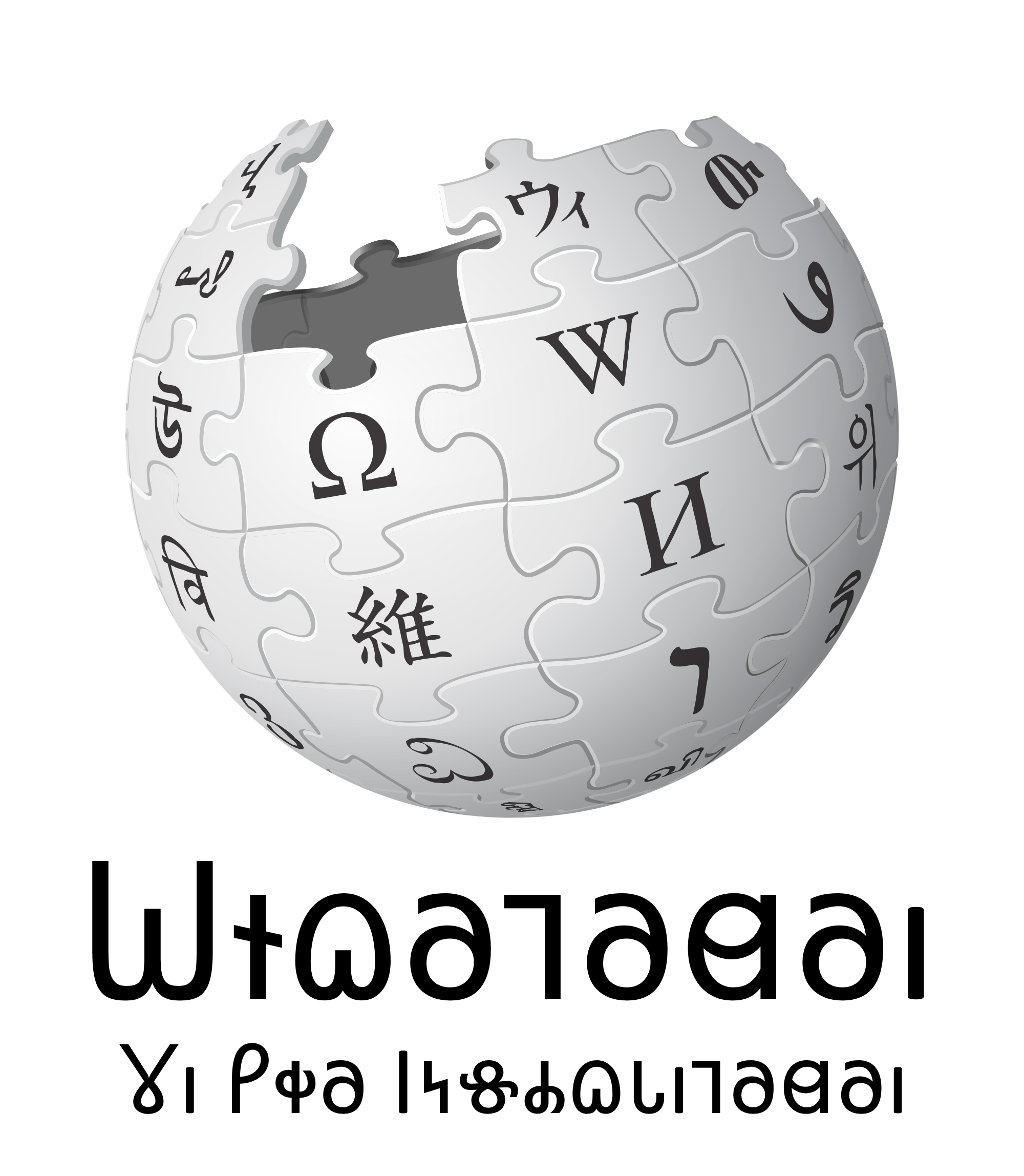
Wikipedia logo, with Wikipedia, The Free Encyclopedia written in the Deseret alphabet

These proposals seek to eliminate the extensive use of digraphs (such as "ch", "gh", "kn-", "-ng", "ph", "qu", "sh", voiced and voiceless "th", and "wh-") by introducing new letters and/or diacritics. Each letter would then represent a single sound. In a digraph, the two letters represent not their individual sounds but instead an entirely different and discrete sound, which can lengthen words and lead to mishaps in pronunciation.

Notable proposals include:

- Benjamin Franklin's phonetic alphabet
- Deseret alphabet
- English Phonotypic Alphabet
- Interspel
- Shavian alphabet (revised version: Quikscript)
- SaypU (Spell As You Pronounce Universally)
- Simpel-Fonetik Method of Writing
- Unifon

Some speakers of non-Latin script languages occasionally write English phonetically in their respective writing systems, which may be perceived as an ad hoc spelling reform by some.

== Historical and contemporary advocates of reform ==
Many respected and influential people have been active supporters of spelling reform. This list of English-language spelling reform advocates who are notable for other reasons lists them by date of birth where possible.

=== Successful reform advocates ===
- Samuel Johnson, poet, wit, essayist, biographer, critic and eccentric, broadly credited with the standardization of English spelling in his Dictionary of the English Language (1755).
- Noah Webster, author of the first important American dictionary, believed that Americans should adopt simpler spellings where available and recommended it in his A Compendious Dictionary of the English Language (1806).

=== Other reform advocates ===
==== Pre-19th century ====
- Orrm, 12th century Augustine canon monk and eponymous author of the Ormulum, in which he stated that, since he dislikes that people are mispronouncing English, he will spell words exactly as they are pronounced, and describes a system whereby vowel length and value are indicated unambiguously. He distinguished short vowels from long by doubling the following consonants, or, where this is not feasible, by marking the short vowels with a superimposed breve accent.
- Thomas Smith, a secretary of state to Queen Elizabeth I, who published his proposal De recta et emendata linguæ angliæ scriptione, 1568, which advocates for spelling reform while not detailing its own system.
- Charles Butler, British naturalist and author of the first natural history of bees: Đe Feminin' Monarķi, 1634. He proposed that "men should write altogeđer according to đe sound now generally received", and espoused a system in which the h in digraphs was replaced with bars.
- John Wilkins, English Anglican bishop and natural philosopher, published An Essay towards a Real Character and a Philosophical Language, 1668, in which he proposed that ⟨father⟩ should be spelled ⟨fadher⟩, among other things.
- Benjamin Franklin, American innovator and revolutionary, added letters to the Roman alphabet for his own personal solution to the problem of English spelling in 1768.

==== 19th century onwards ====
- Robert Bridges, British Poet Laureate from 1913 to 1930, devised a phonetic alphabet for English, as well as removing useless silent "e"s.
- George Bernard Shaw, playwright, willed part of his estate to fund the creation of what would become the Shavian alphabet.
- Upton Sinclair, author, wrote a letter to Theodore Roosevelt advocating for spelling reform.
- Mont Follick, Labour (UK) Member of Parliament, polyglot and author who preceded Pitman in drawing the English spelling reform issue to the attention of Parliament in 1949 and 1952. Favored replacing w and y with u and i.
- James Pitman, grandson of Isaac Pitman, publisher and Conservative Member of Parliament, invented the Initial Teaching Alphabet, which is not technically a spelling reform.
- Ronald Reagan, U.S. president, supported reform in his youth, and retained some simplified spellings even when in office, such as "bellys", "mysterys", "nite", "burocrat", "burocracy".
- Richard Feynman, physicist, gave a talk entitled This Unscientific Age in which he advocated for spelling reform, among other things.
- Isaac Asimov, author, wrote several essays on language reform in which he proposed respelling all word-final GOOSE as ⟨oo⟩, ⟨night⟩ as ⟨nite⟩ as well as reforming grammar.
- Doug Everingham, former Australian Labor politician and health minister in the Whitlam government, was a proponent of SR1, which he used in ministerial correspondence.
- Valerie Yule, clinical child psychologist and fellow of the Galton Institute, was vice-president of The English Spelling Society and created Interspel.

==== English Spelling Reform Association ====
The English Spelling Reform Association (also known as the British Spelling Reform Association), the precursor to the English Spelling Society, was founded in 1879 with the following people on its list of vice-presidents bar Archibald Sayce, who was the president.

- Charles Darwin, famous biologist, whose involvement in the subject was continued by his physicist grandson of the same name.
- Alfred, Lord Tennyson, poet laureate.
- Isaac Pitman, creator of Pitman shorthand.
- Alexander John Ellis, philologist.
- Alexander Bain, philosopher.
- Max Müller, philologist, who published works advocating for spelling reform.
- John Hall Gladstone, chemist.
- John Lubbock, 1st Baron Avebury, close friend of Charles Darwin.
- Walter William Skeat, philologist, who would go on to found the English Spelling Society and was also a member of the Simplified Spelling Board.
- James Murray, editor of the OED, who was also a member of the Simplified Spelling Board.
- Henry Sweet, linguist.
- Archibald Sayce, Assyriologist and philologist.

==== Simplified Spelling Board ====
Simplified Spelling Board was founded in 1906 with the following people on its list of members.

- Andrew Carnegie, philanthropist, who donated to spelling reform societies on the U.S. and Britain, and funded the Simplified Spelling Board.
- Theodore Roosevelt, U.S. president, commissioned the Simplified Spelling Board to research and recommend simpler spellings and tried to require the U.S. government to adopt them, though his approach to assume popular support by executive order rather than to garner it, was a likely factor in the limited change of the time.
- Mark Twain, author and humorist.
- Melvil Dewey, inventor of the Dewey Decimal System, wrote published works in simplified spellings and even simplified his own name from Melville to Melvil.

==== English Spelling Society ====
The English Spelling Society, (formerly the Simplified Spelling Society) was founded in 1908 and is still in operation. A full list of their presidents can be found on that page.

- Robert Baden-Powell, 1st Baron Baden-Powell was a vice-president.
- Israel Gollancz, philologist, was a founding member.
- H. G. Wells, science fiction writer, became a one-time vice-president after granting permission to publish one of his short stories in reformed spelling, presumably The Star, given its continued use by the society.
- Daniel Jones, phonetician and professor of phonetics at University College London, was a president.
- Charles Galton Darwin, physicist grandson of Charles Darwin, was a wartime vice-president.
- Prince Philip, Duke of Edinburgh, was a one-time patron, and stated that spelling reform should start outside of the UK, and that the lack of progress originates in the discord amongst reformers. However, his abandonment of the cause was coincident with literacy being no longer an issue for his own children, and his less than lukewarm involvement may have ended as a result of the society's rejection of attempts to "pull strings" behind the scenes.
- Anatoly Liberman, professor in the Department of German, Scandinavian and Dutch at the University of Minnesota, is the current president, and has advocated for spelling reforms in his weekly column on word origins at the Oxford University Press blog. He has expressed a desire to remove the letters "c", "q", and "x", where possible.
- John C. Wells, former professor of phonetics at University College London, is a former president who advocated for New Spelling.

== See also ==
- "The Chaos", a poem demonstrating the irregularity of English spelling
- Folk etymology
- Ghoti
- History of English grammars
- History of the English language
- List of language reforms of English
- Orthographies and dyslexia
- Phonemic orthography
- The Phonetic Journal
- Phonological history of English
