= List of language reforms of English =

For centuries, many people have called for language reforms of English, which vary in approach from the radical (completely overhauling existing conventions) to the conservative (preserving most while removing irregularities).

Phonetic alphabets limited to English do not belong here. See Category:Phonetic alphabets.

== Spelling reforms ==
Spelling reforms are attempts to regularize English spelling either by reducing the number of irregularities or by making it completely phonemic. This may be done using the existing basic English alphabet more uniformly (basic), by adding diacritics (diacriticized), by adding new letters (extended), by removing letters in the script or writing (squeezed), by removing letters and replacing it by new ones (altered) or by replacing it entirely (replaced). Such proposals include:

Proposals for English language spelling reforms
Name of work	Date completed	Creator(s)	Alphabet
Ormulum	c. 1150–1180	Orrm	Extended
Gospel according to Saint Matthew	1550	John Cheke	Diacriticized
The Opening of the Unreasonable Writing of Our Inglish Toung	1551	John Hart	Extended
De recta & emendata lingvæ Anglicæ scriptione, dialogus (Correct and Improved English Writing, a Dialogue)	1568	Thomas Smith	Diacriticized
Booke at Large for the Amendment of English Orthographie	1580	William Bullokar	Extended
The Art of Pronuntiation	1617	Robert Robinson	Extended
Logonomia Anglica	1619	Alexander Gill	Extended
The English Grammar	1633	Charles Butler	Extended
A New English Grammar	1662	James Howell	Basic
Benjamin Franklin's phonetic alphabet	1768	Benjamin Franklin	Extended
A Compendious Dictionary of the English Language	1806	Noah Webster	Basic
A Plea for Phonetic Spelling	1848	Alexander John Ellis	Extended
Deseret alphabet	1847–1854	Board of regents of the University of Deseret	Replaced
SoundSpel (previously Classic New Spelling, New Spelling, World English Spelling)	1910–1986	Various	Basic, Extended
Robert Bridges' Literary Alphabet	1913	Robert Bridges, David Abercrombie and Stanley Morison	Extended
Handbook of Simplified Spelling	1920	Simplified Spelling Board	Basic
The Global Alphabet	1944	Robert L. Owen	Replaced
Unifon	1950s	John Malone	Extended
Regularized Inglish	1959	Axel Wijk	Basic
Shavian alphabet (revised as Quikscript)	1960 (revised 1966)	Ronald Kingsley Read	Replaced
Spelling Reform 1 (SR1)	1969	Harry Lindgren	Basic
Interspel	1986	Valerie Yule	Extended
Cut Spelling	1992	Christopher Upward	Squeezed
SaypYu (Spell As You Pronounce Universally)	2012	Jaber George Jabbour	Altered
Simpel-Fonetik method of writing	2012	Allan Kiisk	Extended
Traditional Spelling Revised (TSR)	2021	Stephen Linstead	Diacriticized

== Subsets ==
Subsets are reforms that use a restricted wordlist and grammar. English subsets include:

- Attempto Controlled English
- Aviation English
- Basic English
- ClearTalk
- Common Logic Controlled English
- E-Prime
- Gellish Formal English
- Globish
- Learning English
- Logical English
- ModeLang
- Newspeak (fictional)
- Plain English
- Processable English (PENG)
- Seaspeak
- SBVR Structured English
- Simplified Technical English
- Specialized English

== Vocabulary reforms ==
Vocabulary reforms seek to reform English by changing or restricting its words without changing its grammar.

- Anglish: the use of native (Germanic) words only, and spellings of such without foreign influence—a form of linguistic purism
