= Cut Spelling =

System of English-language spelling reform

Cut Spelling is a system of English-language spelling reform which reduces redundant letters and makes substitutions to improve correspondence with the spoken word. It was designed by Christopher Upward and was for a time being popularized by the Simplified Spelling Society. The resulting words are 8–15% shorter than standard spellings. The name Cut Spelling was coined by psychologist Valerie Yule.

Unlike some other proposed reforms, Cut Spelling does not attempt to make English spelling phonemic, but merely attempts to remove many of the unneeded difficulties of the current spelling. Cut Spelling differs from "traditional orthography" mainly in removing letters from words and makes relatively few substitutions of letters compared with other proposed reforms. According to its designers, this allows readers accustomed to traditional orthography to get used to Cut Spelling fairly quickly and easily, while still giving learners of the language a much simplified and systematic spelling system.

== Rules ==
Cut Spelling uses three main reduction rules to convert traditional spellings into "cut spellings":

1. Letters irrelevant to pronunciation. This rule deletes most silent letters, except when these letters (such as "magic e") help indicate pronunciation. Omitting or including the wrong silent letters are common errors. Examples: peace → pece, except → exept, plaque → plaq, blood → blod, pitch → pich.
2. Cutting unstressed vowels. English unstressed syllables are usually pronounced with the vowel schwa /ə/, which has no standard spelling, but can be represented by any vowel letter. Writing the wrong letter in these syllables is a common error ─ for example, writing seperate for separate. Cut Spelling eliminates these vowel letters completely before approximants (/l/ and /r/) and nasals (/m/, /n/, and /ŋ/). In addition, some vowel letters are dropped in suffixes, reducing the confusion between -able and -ible. Examples: symbol → symbl, victim → victm, lemon → lemn, better → betr, permanent → permnnt, waited → waitd, churches → churchs, warmest → warmst, edible → edbl.
3. Simplifying doubled consonants. This rule helps with another of the most common spelling errors: failing to double letters (accommodate and committee are often misspelled) or introducing erroneously doubled letters. Cut Spelling does not eliminate all doubled letters: in some words (especially two-syllable words) the doubled consonant letter is needed to differentiate from another differently pronounced word (e.g., holly and holy). Examples: innate → inate, necessary → necesary, spell → spel.

The Cut Spelling system also uses three substitution rules:

1. The digraphs gh and ph become f when pronounced /f/. Examples: draught → draft and photograph → fotograf.
2. The letter g is changed to j when pronounced /dʒ/ or /ʒ/. Examples: judge → juj, rouge → ruje.
3. The combinations ig and igh are changed to y when pronounced /aɪ/. Examples: flight → flyt, sign → syn.

The Cut Spelling Handbook also lists optional additional rules such as replacing ch with k when it makes the /k/ sound, respelling as y unusual patterns that make the /aɪ/ diphthong, as well as replacing -tion, -cian, -sion, -ssion, etc. with -shn.

== Examples ==
"Wen readrs first se Cut Spelng, as in this sentnce, they ofn hesitate slytly, but then quikly becom acustmd to th shortnd words and soon find text in Cut Spelng as esy to read as traditional orthografy, but it is th riter ho realy apreciates th advantajs of Cut Spelng, as many of th most trublsm uncertntis hav been elimnated."

Th Space Race was th competition between th United States and th Soviet Union, rufly from 1957 to 1975. It involvd th efrts by each of these nations to explor outr space with satlites, to be th 1st to send there a human being and to send mand and unmand missions on th Moon with a safe return of th humans to Erth.

Tho its roots lie in erly roket tecnolojy and in th intrnationl tensions foloing World War II, th Space Race efectivly began with th Soviet launch of Sputnik 1 on 4 October 1957. Th term orijnated as an analojy to th arms race. Th Space Race became an importnt part of th cultrl and tecnolojicl rivalry between th USSR and th US during th Cold War. Space tecnolojy became a particularly importnt arena in this conflict, both because of its militry applications and du to th sycolojicl benefit of rasing morale.

Rokets hav intrestd sientists and amatrs for at least 2,100 years, and Chinese soldirs used them as wepns as erly as th 11th century. Russian sientist Konstantin Tsiolkovsky theorized in th 1880s on multi-staje, liquid fuel rokets which myt reach space, but only in 1926 did th American Robert Goddard desyn a practicl liquid-fuel roket.

Note
The example above assumes British pronunciation by abbreviating "military" to "militry".

== See also ==
- List of reforms of the English language
- Spelling Reform 1 (SR1)
- Handbook of Simplified Spelling
- Traditional Spelling Revised
