= Robert Stanton Avery =

American mathematician (1808–1894)

- Born: 1808
- Died: 1894 (aged 85–86)
- Education: Harvard Divinity School
- Scientific career
- Fields: Mathematics
- Workplaces: Tidal Division; United States Coast Survey

Robert Stanton Avery (1808–1894) was an American mathematician. In 1846, he graduated from Harvard Divinity School, and soon after turned his attention to mathematics and physical sciences. He taught math in schools in the South, until he was drafted into the United States Coast Survey, during which he became the Chief of the Tidal Division. In 1885, he was retired from USCS, and devoted his last years to the development of the techniques of phonetic spelling. He died in 1894.
