= Spelling Reform 1 =

Proposal by Harry Lindgren in 1969

Spelling Reform 1 (commonly known as SR1) is an Australian spelling reform that was proposed by British-Australian engineer, linguist and amateur mathematician Harry Lindgren in 1969. It was developed as the first step in a planned, gradual approach to making English spelling more phonetic.

SR1's single rule is that the short e vowel sound (/ɛ/, as in bet) should be spelt only with an e. Under the reform, words such as friend and head would become frend and hed. Lindgren stated that limiting each reform to one small, simple and easily understood rule would allow English orthography to be adjusted incrementally over a couple of generations.

The reform attracted notable attention in Australia during the 1970s, being voluntarily adopted by a number of writers, educators and publications, and considered by teachers' organisations and educational authorities. SR1 also faced criticism from linguists, educators and members of the public, who objected to its practical, etymological and aesthetic implications. Despite the interest and debate it generated, SR1 was never officially implemented in schools and gradually fell out of use, with spelling reform organisations later moving on from the proposal.

== Conception and purpose ==
Lindgren, once a schoolteacher in Western Australia, became convinced that learning to spell was dull and wasted too much time. In his book he claims pupils devote 500 hours towards learning to spell, but that only 100 hours would be needed to reach the same standard with the reformed spellings of SR1, and even that spelling lessons could be abolished entirely. Lindgren argued making spelling phonetic would help dyslexic children and poor readers, believing the reform would give such children equal opportunity. His goal was to eliminate illiteracy by reducing spelling's difficulty to less than a tenth of what it is.

Around the time SR1 was published, up to 40% of Australian students reportedly left secondary school "virtually illiterate". Lindgren presented typical spelling mistakes and oddities he believed would occur less often with phonetic spelling, such as confusing sweet with sweat and children struggling to spell isosceles and cycle (after learning bicycle). He saw English spelling as outdated and unpredictable compared to other languages, giving precede, proceed, bereave, receive and relieve as examples of English's irregularity. Lindgren believed English spelling should be phonetic ("this sound is written thus") and that this should be achieved gradually in a step-by-step process; he chose SR1's step-by-step approach to cause the least amount of disturbance. He also claimed the cost of reforming spelling would be "next to nothing" and would be more beneficial than, for instance, Australia's switch to decimal currency.

=== Future reforms ===
One of Lindgren's principles was "SR1 and nothing else" as he believed the public was unable to adopt multiple spelling reforms at once. In his 1969 book Spelling Reform: A New Approach, Lindgren published only the first step, SR1; he intentionally neglected writing about SR2 and subsequent steps to allow regulatory bodies to freely plan them in the future.

Lindgren did, however, write that future spelling reforms should include spelling the other short vowels phonetically as well. For example, the short o vowel sound (/ɒ/, as in hot) would be spelt only with an o (e.g. salt→solt, wash→wosh). He believed consonants should also be reformed (e.g. of→ov, nephew→nevew) but advised that this was less urgent than reforming the vowels. Each spelling reform was to be introduced only once the public had become familiar with the last.

== SR1 in practice ==
Lindgren provided the following examples to demonstrate what SR1 would change.

/ɛ/	Current	SR1
a	any	eny
ae	haemorrhage	hemorrhage
ai	said	sed
ay	says	ses
ea	head	hed
ee	threepence	threpence
ei	heifer	hefer
eo	leopard	lepard
ie	friend	frend
u	bury	bery
ue	guess	gess

Lindgren initially claimed SR1 would affect 1 in 165 words (0.6%), with the most common SR1 words being eny, meny, insted and potentially sed; he later revised this estimate to about 1 in 100 words. From a compiled list of the top 500 most common words in English, SR1 was found to modify 2% of nouns, 1% of verbs and 5% of adjectives. In 1978, one of the most commonly used word lists by teachers in Australia was the Dolch Basic Sight Vocabulary; SR1 modifies 1.7% (1 in 59) of its words.

=== Examples in writing ===
The following poem was written in SR1.

Draw a breth for progress,
Tred abrest ahed.
Fight agenst old spelling,
Better "red" than "read".
Spred the words at brekfast,
Mesure them in bed,
Dream of welth and tresure,
Better "ded" than "dead".

The following is an excerpt from page 23 of Spelling Reform: A New Approach, containing three words modified by SR1.

In the first place, you will surely agree that enyone who ses it looks awful is talking through his hat. In the second place, the only books at all affected are dictionaries (uni- and bi-lingual) and language textbooks. To them one need only add the SR1 list. It can be inserted in books alredy printed; if a book is being reprinted unrevised, the list can be included in the reprinting as a supplement.

== Reception ==
SR1 received notable attention in Australia. Two years after publishing his book, in 1971, Lindgren founded the Spelling Action Society (SAS) in Canberra and published the newsletter Spelling Action to publicise SR1. He would also frequently write editorials in magazines and in The Canberra Times, discussing spelling reform.

Numerous public figures voluntarily adopted the reform. Dr L. J. J. Nye wrote a booklet titled An International Language as a World Civilising Influence in SR1 and would later, in 1972, write the novel Escape to Elysium in SR1. From 1970 onwards, SR1 was used by Kevin Grover in his regular features in The Teachers' Journal. That same year, Ross Williams used SR1 in the journal Modern Teaching and the newsletter Coffee Talk, both publications of the Modern Teaching Methods Association. Doug Everingham, the former Australian Minister for Health from 1972 to 1975 and a member of SAS, began advocating for SR1 by referring to himself as the "Minister for Helth" and his department as the "Department of Helth". Gough Whitlam, a former prime minister, found this amusing, naming himself "Gof" and Doug "Dug" in their correspondences. In 1973, the principal of Murwillumbah High School, Joe Elliot, began publishing weekly school notes in SR1. Also in 1973, the magazine Canberra Poetry announced it would publish issues in SR1 and other reforms. In March 1975, award-winning Australian poet Mark O'Connor wrote Reef Poems in SR1. In 1976, Rosemary Walters wrote In the Pub: a guide to the learning resources in the Public Service (A.C.T.), a document for the Canberra Ministry of Education, in SR1.

By around 1975, the SAS had over 700 members across Australia, making SR1 one of the most popular spelling reforms of the time. Beginning in 1977, SR1 was used throughout the periodical The ANU Scientist. In December 1977, Graham Jackson published the novel The Coals of Juniper in SR1, followed by Judith Rodriguez in 1978 with her poetry book Shadow on Glass. Beginning in March 1978, SR1 was used throughout Teacher Feedback, a periodical published by the NSW Teachers Federation. The reform also appeared in the United States, with the American magazine Computers and People having some editorials written in SR1. In 1980, Mark O'Connor published another poetry book in SR1 titled The Eating Tree.

=== Stage 1 ===
In 1984, using SR1 as a starting point, the United Kingdom–based Simplified Spelling Society (SSS), of which Lindgren was a member, created a five-part reform proposal called Stage 1. The proposals were first printed in the November 1983 edition of the society's newsletter; in April 1984, during its annual meeting, they were adopted as the society's house style. The SSS stated the reforms could either be used together or individually (as a step-by-step change).

The four extra proposals are:

DUE

DUE stands for "Drop Useless E's" and removes the letter e from words where it is unnecessary or misleading. The e at the end of have would be discarded, but not at the end of behave, as in the latter case the e makes the a-sound longer (see Silent e). Thus: are→ar, were→wer, give→giv, have→hav, some→som, because→becaus, gauze→gauz, leave→leav, freeze→freez, sleeve→sleev, achieve→achiev, examine→examin, practise→practis, opposite→opposit, involve→involv, serve→serv, valley→vally, heart→hart.

ph

Change ph to f when pronounced as /f/. Thus: photo→foto, telephone→telefone, physical→fysical.

augh

- Shorten augh to au when pronounced as /ɔː/. Thus: caught→caut, fraught→fraut, daughter→dauter.
- Shorten augh to af when pronounced as /f/. Thus: laugh→laf.

ough

- Shorten ough to u when pronounced as /u/. Thus: through→thru.
- Shorten ough to o when pronounced as /əʊ/. Thus: though→tho, although→altho (but doh for dough).
- Shorten ough to ou when pronounced as /aʊ/. Thus: bough→bou, drought→drout, plough→plou.
- Shorten ough to au when pronounced as /ɔː/. Thus: bought→baut, ought→aut, thought→thaut.
- Shorten ough to of or uf (depending on its pronunciation) when pronounced as /f/. Thus: cough→cof, enough→enuf, tough→tuf.

=== Australian Teachers' Federation ===
In January 1975, the Australian Teachers' Federation voted during their annual meeting on whether Australian schools should teach SR1. C. R. Barnfield, the president of the Tasmanian Teachers' Federation, introduced the proposal, stating that English spelling was archaic and that learning it wasted time. J. Christiansen, of the Queensland Teachers' Union, agreed, maintaining that vowel shifts should finally be recognised in our spelling. Members from the Victorian Teachers' Federation and South Australian Institute of Teachers opposed the reform, arguing it would be confusing and expensive to adopt. Dr. J. Vaughan, member of the NSW Department of Education, promised to consider the proposal if it was officially submitted to the department; the vote succeeded, and the federation went on to recommend to state educational authorities and the Commonwealth Schools Commission that English spelling should be reformed. Rupert Hamer, former Premier of Victoria, and the acting Victorian Minister for Education gave permission for schools to teach SR1 in Victoria, though traditional spelling continued to be used.

Starting in the 1980s, the Australian Teachers' Federation went through rebrands and mergers with other unions, becoming the Australian Education Union in 1993. Their SR1 policy was not carried over.

=== Criticism ===
SR1 drew criticism from both linguists and the public, prompting extensive debate in papers such as The Canberra Times and Sunday Mail. When the Australian Teachers' Federation recommended that schools should teach the reform, several public figures initially supported the proposal but later backtracked following public backlash. SR1 was used to mock the Whitlam government and the Australian Labor Party of which Everingham, the "Minister of Helth", was a member.

Critics described spelling reforms such as SR1 as vandalism of English, stating it would sever etymological roots and semantic links. Some feared SR1 would diminish the beauty, richness and flexibility of English, disconnecting readers from older literature. Others dismissed the reformed spellings as ugly and ridiculous.

SR1 also faced objections from within the spelling reform movement itself. Other spelling reformers disagreed with SR1's approach, claiming that incremental change was insufficient or arguing that gh spellings should be addressed first. Another criticism regarded the creation of new homophones, which opponents said could cause confusion. People expressed concern that SR1's implementation could alienate Australia from other English-speaking countries if they refused to partake in the reform, and additionally that spelling words phonetically was impractical given the variation in pronunciation among English speakers worldwide. Lindgren and other reformers were also criticised for being arrogant and imposing.

== Outcome ==
Despite enthusiasm in the 1970s and with many writers and editors voluntarily practising the reform, SR1 ultimately had no long-term success in Australia. It faded from public consciousness over the next few decades and with Lindgren's declining health and death in 1992 and despite Everingham briefly becoming the editor of Spelling Action, the Spelling Action Society was disbanded and its newsletter discontinued. The Simplified Spelling Society, now known as the English Spelling Society, has since moved on from SR1 and Stage 1.

== Phonetic A and B ==
In Spelling Reform: A New Approach, Lindgren also published two lesser-known phonetic writing systems for English alongside SR1. They are more advanced than SR1 as they revolutionise English orthography instead of only standardising the short e vowel sound. Lindgren based the two reforms on New Spelling by Walter Ripman and William Archer. The following excerpt is from William Shakespeare's play The Merchant of Venice, which Lindgren used to demonstrate Phonetic A and B.

If you prick us, do we not bleed? If you tickle us, do we not laugh? If you poison us, do we not die? And if you wrong us, shall we not revenge? If we are like you in the rest, we will resemble you in that. If a Jew wrong a Christian, what is his humility? Revenge. If a Christian wrong a Jew, what should his sufferance be by Christian example? Why, revenge.

The examples of Phonetic A and B used below are directly from Spelling Reform: A New Approach.

=== Phonetic A ===
Phonetic A introduces no new letters or diacritics. It simplifies English's vowels so that they are consistent and match other languages such as Italian and German. Lindgren repurposed the apostrophe to represent the schwa, arguing this would simplify confusable suffixes such as -able and -ible; -er, -or and -ar; and -ence and -ance, and would also help indicate stress such as purf'kt vs. p'rfekt. It reduces doubled letters to single letters.

- Short vowels (except /ʊ/) are spelt the same: /æ/→a, /ɛ/→e, /ɪ/→i, /ɒ/→o, /ʌ/→u, /ʊ/→oo
- Diphthongs become: /eɪ/→ei, /aɪ/→ai, /ɔɪ/→oi, /əʊ/→ou, /aʊ/→au (die→dai, day→dei, how→hau, coy→koi)
- The schwa is replaced with an apostrophe (seven→sev'n, quiet→kwai't, society→s'sai'ti, committee→k'miti, arose→ 'rouz, ya→y')
  - Words ending with -r suffixes use an r instead of an apostrophe (colour→kulr, grammar→gramr, sister→sistr, officer→of'sr)
  - However, apostrophes are removed if they are unnecessary or the consonant cluster does not exist: s'sai'ti→ssai'ti, k'miti→kmiti, horror→hor'r→horr, fences→fens'z→fensz, chorus→ko'r's→ko'rs (committee is spelt kmiti since /km/ does not occur in English)
- Long vowels are indicated with an apostrophe: /ɛə/→e', /ɪə/→i', /aː/→a', /ɔː/→o', /ɜː/→u' (story→sto'ri, fairy→fe'ri)
  - But if the long vowel is not followed by another vowel or if the word ends with a vowel: /ɛə/→er, /ɪə/→ir, /ɔː/→or, /aː/→ar, /ɜː/→ur (tar→tar, sort→sort, fare→fer, weird→wird, tart→tart)
  - Long e is also written with an apostrophe: /iː/→i' (lean→li'n, lien→li''n)
  - Long u is written as: /uː/→uu, /juː/→yu
- Consonants and digraphs become: q→kw, x→ks or gz, wh→w, /k/→k, /tʃ/→c, /z/→z, /s/→s, /dʒ/→j, /ŋ/→ng, /ð/→dh, /ʒ/→zh, /j/→y (quiet→kwai't, axes→aksz, is→iz, church→curc, gem→jem, ink→ingk, finger→fingger, this→dhis, vision→vizhn, million→milyn)
  - Syllabic consonants are spelt on their own (handsome→hansm, little→litl)
  - -ed when pronounced as /t/ is spelt as t (stopped→stopt)
- Hyphens indicate letters are pronounced separately (engage→engeij→en-geij, lighthouse→laithaus→lait-haus)
- The article a when unstressed is fused with the following word ("An apple and a pear"→'N apl 'nd 'per)

The excerpt from The Merchant of Venice written in Phonetic A is as follows:

If y' prik 's, duu wi not bli'd? if y' tikl 's, duu wi not la'f? if y' poizn 's, duu wi not dai? 'nd if y' rong 's, shal wi not rivenj? If wi 'r laik yu in dh' rest, wi wl rizembl yu in dhat. If 'Juu rong 'Kristyn, wot iz hiz hy'mil'ti? Rivenj. If 'Kristyn rong 'Juu, wot shd hiz sufr'ns bi' bai Kristyn egzampl? Wai, rivenj.

=== Phonetic B ===
Lindgren considered Phonetic B to be the more efficient and attractive reform of the two. It is largely similar to Phonetic A but uses three French diacritics (the acute accent ◌́, grave accent ◌̀ and circumflex ◌̂) to replace digraphs and indicate vowel length. For example: radio→reidiou (Phonetic A)→rédiô (Phonetic B). It also allows more words to combine.

- Short vowels are the same as Phonetic A except for /ʊ/: oo→ú (good→gúd)
- Diphthongs become: ei→é, ai→á, oi→ó, ou→ô, au→â (lion→lai'n→lá'n, lay→lei→lé)
- Long vowels become: e'→è, i'→ì, a'→à, o'→ò, u'→ù (fairy→fe'ri→fèri, palm→pa'm→pàm, haul→ho'l→hòl)
  - Long e becomes: i'→ì (lean→li'n→lìn)
  - Long u becomes: uu→û, yu→yû (moon→muun→mûn)
- Consonant digraphs become: /ŋ/→n̂, /ð/→d̂, /θ/→t̂, /ʒ/→ẑ, /ʃ/→ŝ (shut→ŝut, this→dhis→d̂is, ink→ingk→in̂k, vision→vizhn→viẑn)
- Words are also fused:
  - The unstressed articles a, an, the and to with the following word ("The way"→D̂wé, "To a better"→Tú'betr)
  - A preposition and a personal pronoun ("From me"→Fr'mmì, "To you"→t'yû)
  - A finite verb and a preceding or following personal pronoun, or an unstressed there ("She likes me"→Ŝiláksmi)
  - A verb or a verb with a pronoun, and not or n't ("We have not"→Wih'vnot, "Haven't we?"→Hav'ntwi?)
- Hyphens can be omitted as digraphs are defunct (lait-haus→láthâs)

The excerpt from The Merchant of Venice written in Phonetic B is as follows:

If yprik's, dûwinot blìd? if ytik'l's, dûwinot làf? if ypóz'n's, dûwinot dá? 'nd if yron̂'s, ŝalwinot rivenj? If wir lákyú in d̂rest, wiwl rizemb'lyú in d̂at. If 'Jû ron̂ 'Kristyn, wot iz hiz hy'mil'ti? Rivenj. If 'Kristyn ron̂ 'Jû, wot ŝd hiz sufr'ns bì bá Kristyn egzampl? Wá, rivenj.

== See also ==
- List of reforms of the English language
- Cut Spelling
- Handbook of Simplified Spelling
- Traditional Spelling Revised
- SoundSpel
