= SoundSpel =

English spelling reform proposal

SoundSpel is a regular and mostly phonemic English-language spelling reform proposal which uses the ISO basic Latin alphabet. Though SoundSpel was originally based on American English, it can represent dialectal pronunciation, including British English. With roots extending as far back as 1910 but largely complete by 1986, SoundSpel was developed "in response to the widely held conviction that English spelling is more complex than it needs to be." The American Literacy Council has endorsed the reform because anglophones can easily read it. Additionally, according to its proponents, "[SoundSpel] is fully compatible with traditional spelling and can be mixed with it in any proportion desired."

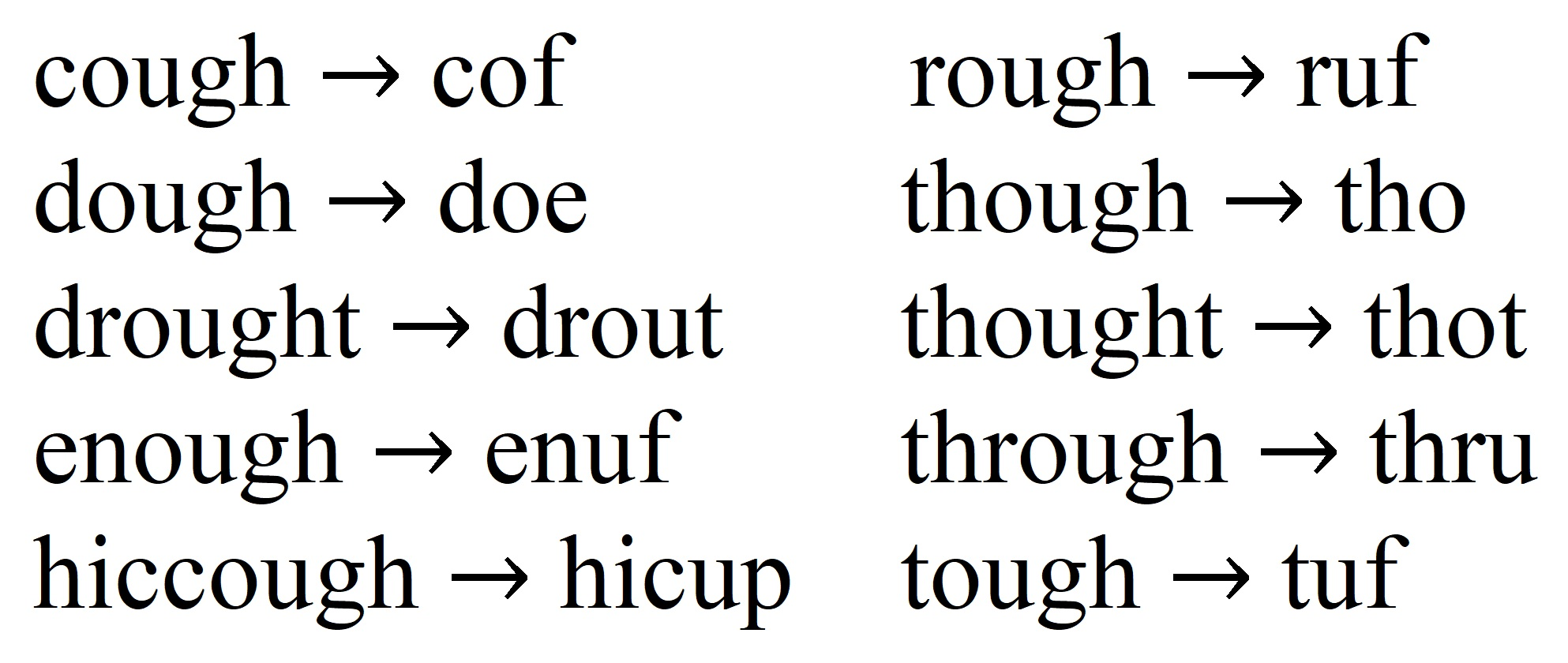
Some common English words containing traditional spelling's infamous tetragraph ⟨ough⟩, written in SoundSpel

== History ==
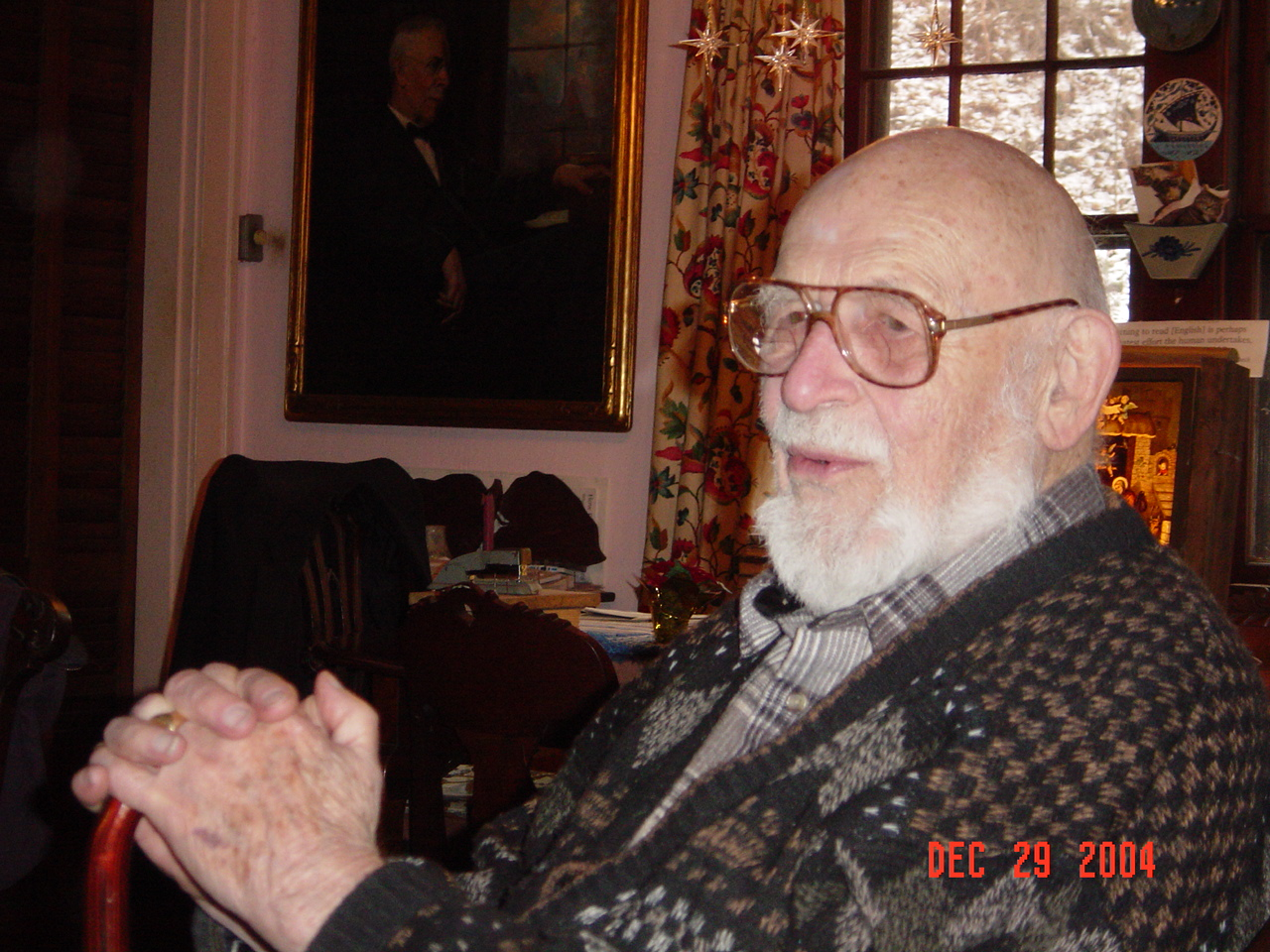
Spelling reform advocate and SoundSpel developer Edward "Ed" Rondthaler in 2004

In 1910, philologist Alexander John Ellis played a major role in developing an English-language spelling system now known as "Classic New Spelling". Walter Ripman and William Archer wrote the system's first dictionary, New Spelling (NuSpelling), which was republished in 1941 by the Simplified Spelling Society.

In the early 1960s, Sir James Pitman developed the Initial Teaching Alphabet, which would become one of SoundSpel's predecessors.

In 1969, Godfrey Dewey improved upon Ripman's and Archer's work, producing World English Spelling. Dewey and Edward Rondthaler, a prominent typesetter and CEO of the International Typeface Corporation, corresponded from 1971.

In 1986, the American Language Academy published the Dictionary of Simplified American Spelling, a book written by Rondthaler and Edward Lias. It calls for the improvement of English spelling, with clearer rules and better grapheme/phoneme correspondence. Its guidelines are less strictly phonemic than Classic New Spelling. For example, the sounds /θ/ and /ð/ are represented by the grapheme ⟨th⟩ in order to follow traditional spelling. Classic New Spelling opts instead for ⟨th⟩ and ⟨dh⟩, respectively.

The system was further reformed from 1987 on and became SoundSpel.

== Description ==
=== Phonetics ===
Spellings here are matched to their sounds using the International Phonetic Alphabet (IPA). SoundSpel examples are accompanied by traditional spellings in italics if different. Note that writings in SoundSpel may not follow these tables exactly due to their time of writing or the author's personal preferences. These tables also do not account for proper nouns (which are discussed under "Exceptions").

"Short" vowels
Spelling	Major values (IPA)	Examples	Minor values (IPA)	Examples
a	/æ/, /ə/ (final)	sat, stigma	/ə/ (Note: ⟨a⟩, ⟨e⟩, ⟨i⟩, and ⟨o⟩ can act as "schwa vowels". See "Schwa and schwi" under "Rules".), /ɔː/ (Note: /ɔː/ is usually spelled ⟨au⟩ or ⟨aw⟩ but can be spelled ⟨a⟩ before ⟨ll⟩, as in all (otherwise spelled aul) and most of the time before ⟨ng⟩ (strong) and ⟨th⟩ (moth).)	ago, all
e (Note: ⟨e⟩ is sometimes used to differentiate confusing pairs (like to / toe and do / doe). Additionally, current versions of SoundSpel recommend using ⟨e⟩ to indicate stress. For example, bellow (/ˈbɛloʊ/) is spelled belo, and below (/bɛˈloʊ/) is spelled beloe.)	/ɛ/	frend (friend)	/ə/, /iː/ (prefixes), /ɪ/, /i/ (Note: See "Schwa and schwi" under "Rules".)	novel, jeografy (geography), event
i	/ɪ/, /aɪ/ (final) (Note: At the end of a word, /aɪ/ and /oʊ/ may be written without an ⟨e⟩, as in fli (fly) and banjo, but otherwise it is required. Hence: banjo and its plural banjoes.)	did, hi, hie (hi, high)	/ə/, /ɪ/, /i/	eezily (easily), trivial
o	/ɒ/, /oʊ/ (final)	dot, lo, loe (lo, low)	/ə/, /ɔː/	lemon, cros
u	/ʌ/	stun (stun)		

"Long" vowels
Spelling	IPA	Examples
ae	/eɪ/	S/sundae (Sunday, sundae)
ee	/iː/	see (see, sea)
ie	/aɪ/	ie (eye, aye), hie
oe	/oʊ/	coed (code), doe (doe, dough)
ue	/juː/	cue (cue, queue)

Other vowels
Spelling	IPA	Examples
aa	/ɑː/	faather (father), garaazh (garage)
au, aw (Note: ⟨ou⟩ and ⟨au⟩ always precede a consonant and never end a word or its root (oul, "owl"; aukward, "awkward"). ⟨ow⟩ and ⟨aw⟩ never begin a word (plow; flawd, "flawed"). These rules tend to mimic traditional spelling's appearance.)	/ɔː/	maul (maul), saw (saw), taul (tall)
ou, ow	/aʊ/	our (hour/our), tower (tower)
oi, oy	/ɔɪ/	toil, oister (oyster), toy
oo	/uː/	moon
uu	/ʊ/	guud (good)

Vowel + r clusters
Spelling	IPA	Examples
aer	/ɛər/	flaer (flair, flare)
ar (Note: When ⟨ar⟩ or ⟨or⟩ precede a stressed vowel (as in maroon and memorandum), the ⟨a⟩ and ⟨o⟩ are pronounced /ə/ and the ⟨r⟩ begins a new syllable.)	/ɑːr/	ark (arc, ark)
arr	/ær/	marry
eer	/ɪər/	teer (tier, tear)
er	/ɜːr/, /ər/	merj (merge), biter (bitter)
err	/ɛr/	terribl (terrible)
or	/ɔːr/	lor (lore)
orr	/ɒr/	sorry
uer	/jʊər/	secuer (secure)
ur (Note: In early versions of SoundSpel, ⟨ur⟩ represents /ɜːr/ for differentiating and indicating stress in some words like convert (noun) and convurt (verb). Now, ⟨ur⟩ and ⟨er⟩ represent different sounds altogether.)	/ɜːr/	concur, thurd (third), turm (term)
uur	/ʊər/	aluur (allure), tuur (tour)

Consonants
Spelling	Major values (IPA)	Examples	Minor values (IPA)	Examples
b	/b/	bom (bomb)		
c/k (Note: ⟨k⟩ is used before the letters ⟨e⟩, ⟨i⟩, and ⟨y⟩ (keebord, 'keyboard'; kil, 'kill'; munky, 'monkey') and when definitively ending closed syllables (qik, 'quick'; bakpak, 'backpack'). ⟨k⟩ is also used to maintain the consistent spelling of roots when inflections and suffixes are added (qikly, 'quickly'). ⟨c⟩ is used in all other cases. These rules prevent French-like pronunciations.)	/k/	cat, kik (kick)		
ch	/tʃ/	ich (itch)		
d	/d/	od (odd)		
f	/f/	foeny (phony)		
g	/ɡ/	gorjus (gorgeous)		
h	/h/	ahed (ahead)	[ç]	huej (huge)
j	/dʒ/	juj (judge)		
l	/l/, [l], [ɫ], [l̩] (Note: To keep the spelling of inflected words with final syllabic consonants regular, SoundSpel retains some vowels. Whenever a schwa vowel separates a word's final consonants in traditional spelling (as in pedal) the vowel is retained (hence the inflected form pedaling). Otherwise, it is dropped (rithm, 'rhythm'; hence rithmik, 'rhythmic').)	litl (little), stil (still)		
m	/m/, [m], [m̩]	mustash (mustache), rithm (rhythm)		
n	/n/, [n], [n̩]	niet (night), buton (button)	/ŋ/ (before k, q, and x)	ink, tranqil (tranquil), linx (lynx)
ng	/ŋ/	rong (wrong)		
p	/p/	parragraf (paragraph)		
q	/kw/	erthqaek (earthquake)		
r	/r/, [ɹ]	rapor (rapport)		
s	/s/	sofmor (sophomore)	/z/ (Note: See "Pluralization" under "Exceptions".)	raes (rays), Occam's (Occam's)
sh	/ʃ/	ishoo (issue)		
t	/t/, [tʰ], [t], [ɾ], [ʔ]	tatl (tattle), coton (cotton)		
th (Note: ⟨th⟩ can represent unvoiced /θ/ or voiced /ð/. Spelling reformers have suggested thh or dh (from edh) for the /ð/ sound, but SoundSpel reluctantly rejects both "in the interest of visual compatibility [with traditional spelling].")	/θ/	thru (through)	/ð/	neether/niether (neither)
v	/v/	uven (oven)		
w	/w/	wae (way, weigh, whey)		
wh	/hw/	whim [w/o merger]		
x	/ks/, /gz/ (Note: 1986 guidelines, which have since been superseded, recommend that ⟨x⟩ represent /gz/ before a vowel (exam, exult) and /ks/ otherwise (expect, fox). When a vowel follows a /ks/ pronunciation, an ⟨s⟩ is inserted after the ⟨x⟩ (axsis, 'axis'; exsodus, 'exodus') so that the rule holds.)	box, exist		
y	/j/	yes	/ɪ/, /i/	funy (funny), raedyo (radio)
z	/z/	buz (buzz)		
zh	/ʒ/	azher (azure)		

=== Rules ===
SoundSpel has changed slightly over time. Listed below are generally the most recent guidelines. Obsolete or optional rules are also listed. Furthermore, the system is not a fait accompli. The Dictionary of Simplified American Spelling reads: "[F]urther fine tuning [of SoundSpel] is [now] appropriate. Recommendations are welcome from all—phoneticians, linguists, educators, publishers, those with a special interest in the subject, and, very importantly, the public at large."

False diphthongs

If a pair of vowel letters do not match a SoundSpel digraph—such as ea—then the syllable ends with the first vowel (as in react, read as 're-act'), jeenius ('genius'), and creaetiv ('creative'). With three or more vowel letters, the syllable ends with the first digraph. For example: flooid ('fluid', read as "floo-id"), hieest ('highest'), and inueendo ('innuendo').

Hyphens and syllable breaks

Hyphens separate adjacent letters that can be mistaken for digraphs. Examples include ⟨nk⟩ in man-kiend ('mankind'), ⟨th⟩ in pent-hous ('penthouse'), and ⟨wh⟩ in cow-hand ('cowhand'). Where ⟨n-g⟩ would be visually awkward, ⟨nn⟩ marks the end of the syllable, as in enngaej ('engage') and enngraev ('engrave'). Hyphens also indicate when ⟨y⟩ is a consonant beginning a syllable (such as in barn-yard) rather than a vowel ending a syllable (as in handyman or apreeshyaet, 'appreciate'), as the latter is much more common. Where ⟨-y⟩ would be visually awkward, a double consonant marks the end of the syllable (as in millyon for 'million' and compannyon for 'companion'). Beyond these examples and those double consonants following /ɔː/ (like in fall and cross), all double consonants surround a syllable break. Examples include meelles ('mealless'), buukkeeper ('bookkeeper'), and cattael ('cattail'). Additionally, double consonants often represent geminates.

Following a prefix, a hyphen indicates that a vowel is long (co-ed, re-arm, bi-lateral). Any adjacent preceding vowel is also long (bio-, neo-). Compare jeo-sentrik ('geocentric') and jeolojy ('geology').

Schwa and schwi

The spelling of /ə/ (schwa) in unstressed syllables remains unchanged (as in organ, novel, and lemon) unless traditional spelling would suggest a mispronunciation (hence 'mountain' is spelled mounten).

To represent schwi (variably described as /ɪ/ or /i/), there are three rules. First, ⟨e⟩ is used in a word's first syllable (event; eqip for 'equip'). Second, ⟨i⟩ is followed by a schwa in the combinations ⟨ia⟩, ⟨io⟩, and ⟨iu⟩ (insomnia; joevial for 'jovial'). Third, ⟨y⟩ is used terminally, or medially when not followed by schwa ⟨a⟩, ⟨o⟩, or ⟨u⟩ (raedyo for 'radio', joevyality for 'joviality'). Using ⟨y⟩ terminally in monosyllabic words such as bee and see (instead of ⟨ee⟩) and their derivatives is discouraged. The letter ⟨y⟩ is also used to prevent ambiguity, such as in terryer ('terrier') and audyens ('audience'), in which ⟨ie⟩ would otherwise represent /aɪ/.

Unstressed ⟨er⟩, ⟨ar⟩, and ⟨or⟩ ("schwer")

SoundSpel retains the spellings of schwers (a portmanteau of schwa and ⟨er⟩). In other words, though /ɑːr/ (⟨ar⟩) and /ɔːr/ (⟨or⟩) may reduce to /ər/ (⟨er⟩) in rapid speech, they keep their original spelling. This is for two reasons. First, the reform's "immediate goal... is to reflect a word's full pronunciation", and second, these words' derivatives often contain the syllable's stressed equivalent (as in victor and victorious), so keeping the old spelling is useful for maintaining aesthetic relationships.

=== Exceptions ===
Irregular spellings
as, be, do, has, he, his, she, me, we, is, of, th(e) (the), thru (through), to, U (you), and derived terms (e.g., being and together) / -ful / most proper nouns

Capitalization and proper nouns

The word I, like in traditional spelling, remains capitalized. The word U, a respelling of you, is also capitalized. As Edward Rondthaler wrote: "Since we accept the flattery of capital I for 'me', let us extend the courtesy of capital U for 'you'." In SoundSpel's 1978 form, however, neither I nor U were capitalized.

SoundSpel retains the spellings of proper nouns to the extent that these are the names of living people, functional institutions, government agencies, brand names, and so on. If both the visual recognition of a name and its correct pronunciation are important, the latter will be given in SoundSpel but in square brackets [ ]. Foreign words that are too awkward to be converted to SoundSpel are represented in italics. Otherwise, most well known proper nouns may be written in SoundSpel. Naturally, SoundSpel dictionaries may use SoundSpel to indicate an irregular proper noun's pronunciation, and months and days of the week may also be respelled.

Pluralization

Neither the plural suffix ⟨-s⟩ (as in jobs), the possessive suffix ⟨-'s⟩ (as in man's), nor the third-person present singular verb suffix ⟨-s⟩ (as in he runs) are changed, even though in all these cases the ⟨s⟩ may be pronounced /z/ at times. A doubled ⟨ss⟩ is used to distinguish words when necessary, as in caes ('cays', /keɪz/) versus caess ('case', /keɪs/). This exception is a break from the Dictionary of Simplified American Spelling, in which plurals were spelled on a strictly phonetic basis (caez and caes respectively). The letter ⟨x⟩ does not form the plurals of words ending with a /k/ sound; for example, the plural of dok ('dock') is not dox, but doks. This follows (formal) traditional spelling.

== Features ==
- Does not introduce any symbols foreign to English like diacritics or ligatures. Relies upon common, familiar digraphs except for ⟨aa⟩, ⟨uu⟩, and ⟨zh⟩.
- Does not dramatically change the appearance of existing words (i.e., through the use of non-Latin letters), and generally decreases text length by about 4%. SoundSpel also promotes more precise pronunciation in speech.
- Removes many doubled letters made redundant under the reform, and has virtually no silent letters.
- Generally not intended to differentiate homophones, as "context takes care of everything [in speech, and therefore writing]." However, as writing is matched with speech, many homographs differentiate, such as 'read', which becomes reed (present tense) and red (past tense).
- Improves consistency of writing, thereby reducing learning time and reading difficulties compared to traditional English spelling. However, compromises and rule exceptions make SoundSpel more difficult than it would be if it were a purely phonemic system.

== Text examples ==
Note that any given example may not exactly follow this article's guidelines due to its time of writing, the author's personal preferences, or the author's (eye) dialect.

=== Th Star by H. G. Wells ===
It was on th furst dae of th nue yeer th anounsment was maed, aulmoest siemultaeniusly frum three obzervatorys, that th moeshon of th planet Neptune, th outermoest of all planets that wheel about th Sun, had becum verry erratic. A retardaeshon in its velosity had bin suspected in Desember. Then, a faent, remoet spek of liet was discuverd in th reejon of th perterbd planet. At furst, this did not cauz eny verry graet exsietment. Sieentific peepl, however, found th intelijens remarkabl enuf, eeven befor it becaem noen that th nue body was rapidly groeing larjer and brieter, and that its moeshon was qiet different frum th orderly progres of th planets. [657 characters]

(It was on the first day of the new year the announcement was made, almost simultaneously from three observatories, that the motion of the planet Neptune, the outermost of all planets that wheel around the sun, had become very erratic. A retardation in its velocity had been suspected in December. Then a faint, remote speck of light was discovered in the region of the perturbed planet. At first this did not cause any very great excitement. Scientific people, however, found the intelligence remarkable enough, even before it became known that the new body was rapidly growing larger and brighter, and that its motion was quite different from the orderly progress of the planets.) [680 characters]

=== Britten wen yung by Frank Kermode ===
We mae nowadaes be chaery about uezing th wurd 'jeenius', but we stil hav a guud iedeea whot is ment bi it. For exampl, thaer ar graet numbers of verry gifted muezishans hoo ar admierd but not cauld jeeniuses. But thaer ar uthers, manifestly prodijus, performing offen at extraordinerrily urly aejes, a varieety of feets so complex that th muezical laeman cuud hardly imajin, eeven with th moest desperat laebor, acomplishing eny of them, whiel eeven muezishans ar astonisht and we then reech for th guud, handy, vaeg Enlietenment wurd and caul them jeeniuses. Th list incloods Mozart and Mendelssohn; and, despiet all th limiting jujments, it incloods Benjamin Britten. [670 characters]

(We may nowadays be chary about using the word ‘genius’, but we still have a good idea what is meant by it. For example, there are great numbers of very gifted musicians who are admired but not called geniuses. But there are others manifestly prodigious, performing, often at extraordinarily early ages, a variety of feats so complex that the musical layman could hardly imagine, even with the most desperate labour, accomplishing any one of them, while even musicians are astonished: and we then reach for the good, handy, vague Enlightenment word and call them geniuses. The list includes Mozart and Mendelssohn; and, despite all the limiting judgments, it includes Benjamin Britten.) [684 characters]

== See also ==
- List of reforms of the English language
- Reforms of French orthography
- German orthography reform of 1996
- English orthography
- English spelling-to-sound correspondences
- Orthography
- Spelling reform
- Defective script
- "The Chaos" (poem demonstrating irregular English spelling)
- Ghoti
- English IPA help
- International Phonetic Alphabet
- Linguistic conservatism
- Linguistic prescription
- Traditional Spelling Revised
