= Spelling reform =

Changing of the fundamental parts of orthography of a language

A spelling reform is a deliberate, often authoritatively sanctioned or mandated change to spelling rules. Proposals for such reform are fairly common, and over the years, many languages have undergone such reforms. Recent high-profile examples are the German orthography reform of 1996 and the on-off Portuguese spelling reform of 1990, which is still being ratified.

There are various goals which may drive such reforms: facilitating literacy and international communication, making etymology clearer, or for aesthetic or political reasons.

Opposition is often based upon concern that old literature will become inaccessible, the presumed suppression of regional accents, the need to learn the new spellings, making etymology less clear, or simple conservatism based on concern over unforeseen effects. Reform efforts are further hampered by user habit and, for many languages, a lack of a central authority to set new spelling standards.

Spelling reform may also be associated with wider discussion about the official script, as well as language planning and language reform.

Orthographic reform may be reverted. In Romanian, the letter â was eliminated in 1953 but reintroduced in 1993.

== Arguments for reform ==
In languages written with a phonetic script (such as an alphabet, syllabary, abugida or, to a lesser extent, abjad), one might expect that there would be a close match of the script or spelling with the spoken sound. However, even if they match at one time and place for some speakers, over time they often do not match well for the majority: one sound may be represented by various combinations of letters and one letter or group of letters pronounced differently. In cases where spelling takes account of grammatical features, these too may become inconsistent.

People who use non-standard spelling are often stigmatized because the mastery of standard spelling is often equated to the level of intelligence or formal education. Spelling is easier in languages with more or less consistent spelling systems, such as Finnish, Serbian, Italian and Spanish, owing either to the fact that pronunciation in these languages has changed relatively little since the establishment of their spelling systems, or the fact that non-phonemic etymological spellings have been replaced with phonemic unetymological spellings as pronunciation changed. Guessing the spelling of a word is more difficult after pronunciation changes significantly, thus yielding a non-phonetic etymological spelling system such as Irish or French. These spelling systems are still 'phonemic' (rather than 'phonetic') since pronunciation can be systematically derived from spelling, although the converse (i.e. spelling from pronunciation) may not be possible. English is an extreme example of a defective orthography in which spelling cannot be systematically derived from pronunciation, but it also has the more unusual problem that pronunciation cannot be systematically derived from spelling.

Spelling reforms have been proposed for various languages over the years; these have ranged from modest attempts to eliminate particular irregularities (such as SR1 or Initial Teaching Alphabet) through more far-reaching reforms (such as Cut Spelling) to attempts to introduce a full phonemic orthography, like the Shavian alphabet or its revised version Quikscript, the Latinization of Turkish or hangul in Korea.

Redundancy of letters is often an issue in spelling reform, which prompts the "Economic Argument"—significant cost savings in the production materials over time—as promulgated by George Bernard Shaw.

The idea of phonemic spelling has also been criticized as it would hide morphological similarities between words with differing pronunciations, thus obscuring their meanings. It is also argued that when people read, they do not try to work out the series of sounds composing each word, but instead they recognize words either as a whole or as a short series of meaningful units (for example morphology might be read as morph+ology, rather than as a longer series of phonemes). In a system of phonetic spelling, these morphemes become less distinct, due to the various pronunciations of allomorphs. For example, in English spelling, most past participles are spelled with -ed, even though its pronunciation can vary (compare raised and lifted).

One of the difficulties in introducing a spelling reform is how to reflect different pronunciations, often linked to regions or classes. If the reform seeks to be totally phonemic in a model dialect, speakers of other dialects will find conflicts with their own usage.

== Arguments against reform ==
- The need to learn the new spellings.
- The supposed need to reprint books and other publications in the new spellings.
- The continued need to learn the old spellings, as older books will exist for some time.
- The need to decide between conflicting proposals. One may even end up with inconsistent adoption between speech communities.
- If spellings are changed to more closely match pronunciation, then their etymology may become more opaque, and diverge from spellings of related words in the same language or in other languages, and also from the pronunciation of other dialects, making the text more opaque for speakers of those languages and dialects.
- Confusion during the transition period.
- Literacy mostly depends on access to education, rather than on the simplicity of a writing system. For example, even though Spanish spelling is much simpler than that of English, the US still has a higher literacy rate than Nicaragua.

== By language ==
=== Bulgarian ===
Bulgarian underwent a spelling reform in 1945, following the Russian model. Several Cyrillic alphabets with 28 to 44 letters were used in the beginning and middle of the 19th century during the effort to codify Modern Bulgarian until an alphabet with 32 letters, proposed by Marin Drinov, gained prominence in the 1870s. The alphabet of Marin Drinov was used until the orthographic reform of 1945, when the letters yat (uppercase Ѣ, lowercase ѣ) and yus (uppercase Ѫ, lowercase ѫ) were removed from the alphabet, reducing the number of letters to 30.

=== Chinese (romanization) ===
In the 1950s, the Language Reform Committee of the People's Republic of China devised the Hanyu Pinyin orthography and promulgated it as the official romanization system of mainland China. Since pinyin became the international standard for Chinese romanization in 1982, other romanizations (including the Wade-Giles system, Gwoyeu Romatzyh developed by Yuen Ren Chao, and Latinxua Sin Wenz) have become rarely used.

The Republic of China (Taiwan) continued to use Wade-Giles romanization until the turn of the 21st century, when the Tongyong Pinyin romanization was introduced. Tongyong Pinyin has been sporadically adopted throughout the island, and criticized for inconsistency. Hanyu Pinyin, the same system used in the mainland, was formally adopted in 2009.

=== Dutch ===
Dutch has undergone a series of major spelling reforms beginning in 1804—with varying levels of official backing and popular acceptance across Dutch-speaking areas.

The Dutch Language Union, founded in 1980 by the Netherlands and Belgium, is now the source of official reforms. In 1995 it issued the "Green Booklet" reform, and in 2005 the spelling changed again.

=== English ===
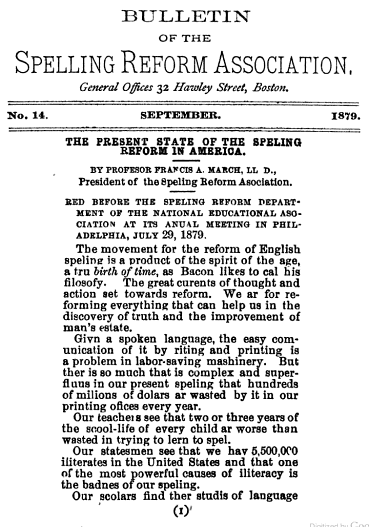
An 1879 bulletin by the US Spelling Reform Association, written mostly using reformed spellings

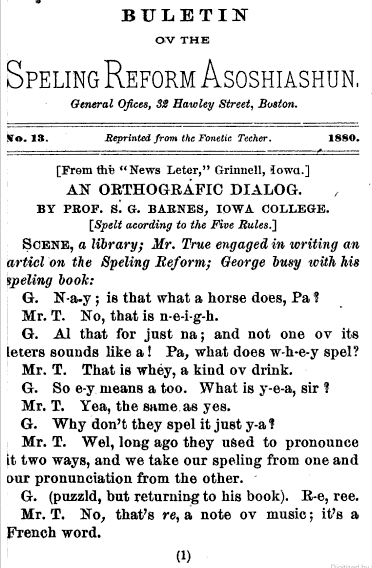
An 1880 bulletin, written wholly in reformed spelling

English spelling contains many irregularities for various reasons. English has generally preserved the original spelling when borrowing words, and even more importantly, English began to be widely written and printed during the Middle English period: the later development of modern English included a Great Vowel Shift and many other changes in phonology, yet the older spellings, which are no longer phonetic, have been kept. On the other hand, many words were refashioned to reflect their Latin or Greek etymology. For example, for "debt" early Middle English wrote det/dette, with the b being standardized in spelling in the 16th century, after its Latin etymon debitum; similarly for quer/quere, which was respelled as choir in the 17th century, modelled on Greek χορός chorus; in both cases, the pronunciation was not changed.

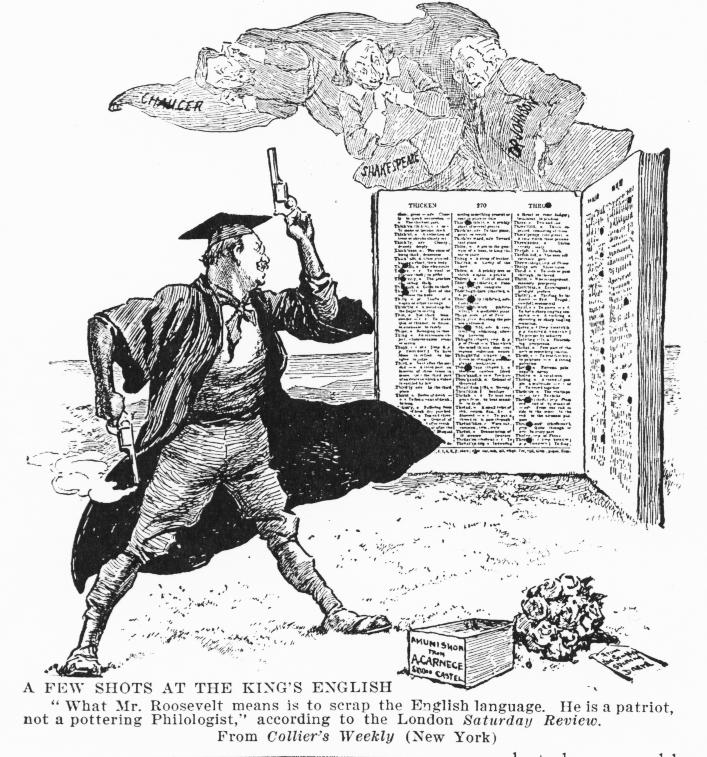
President Theodore Roosevelt was criticized for supporting the simplified spelling campaign of Andrew Carnegie in 1906.

Modern English has anywhere from 14 to 22 vowel and diphthong phonemes, depending on dialect, and 26 or 27 consonant phonemes. A simple phoneme-letter representation of this language within the 26 letters of the English alphabet is impossible. Therefore, most spelling reform proposals include multi-letter graphemes, as does current English spelling (for example the first two phonemes of "sheep" /ˈʃiːp/ are represented by the digraphs ⟨sh⟩, /ʃ/, and ⟨ee⟩, /iː/, respectively). Diacritic marks and use of new letter shapes like Ʒʒ have also formed part of spelling reform proposals. The most radical approaches suggest replacing the Latin alphabet with a writing system designed for English, such as the Deseret alphabet or Shavian alphabet.

Critics have claimed that a consistent phonemically based system would be impractical: for example, phoneme distribution differs between British English and American English; furthermore, while English Received Pronunciation features about 20 vowels, some non-native dialects of English have 10 or even fewer. A phonemic system would therefore not be universal.

A number of proposals have been made to reform English spelling. Some were proposed by Noah Webster early in the 19th century. He was in part concerned to distinguish American from British usage. Some of his suggestions resulted in the differences between American and British spelling.

=== French ===
In 1990, a substantial reform ordered by the French prime minister changed the spelling of about 2000 words as well as some grammar rules. After much delay, the new recommended orthography received official support in France, Belgium, and Quebec in 2004, but it has not yet been widely adopted. The 2012 version of Larousse incorporates all of the changes. The 2009 version of Le Petit Robert incorporates most of the changes. There are 6000 words, including words which were not part of the 1990 reform, for example, charrette or charette, based on chariot. As of 16 March 2009, several major Belgian publishing groups have begun to apply the new spellings in their online publications.

=== German ===
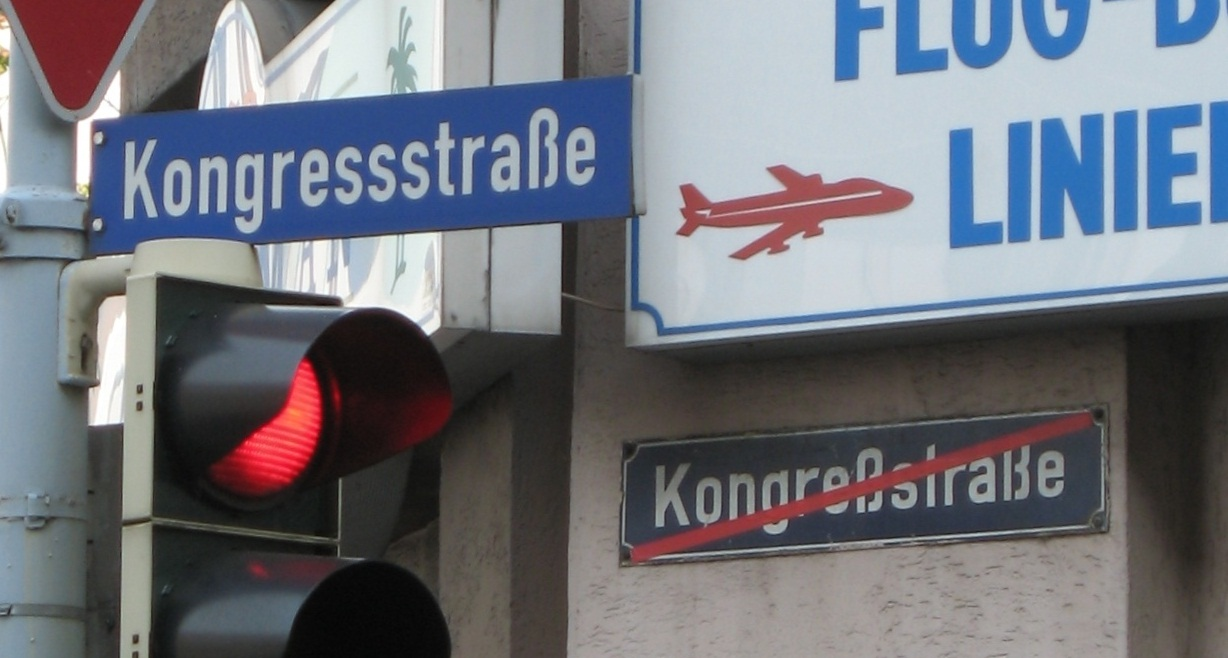
Street name adapted to last German spelling reform

German spelling was officially unified in 1901 and certain older spelling patterns were updated: for instance some occurrences of "th" were changed to "t".

In 1944 a spelling reform was due to be introduced, but it ultimately came to nothing because of World War II.

Even though German spelling was already more consistent than English or French spelling, the German-speaking countries signed an agreement on spelling reforms in 1996; these were planned to be gradually introduced beginning in 1998 and fully in force by 2005. The so-called Rechtschreibreform was subject to dispute, and polls consistently showed a majority against the new spelling. In summer 2004, various newspapers and magazines returned to the old spelling, and in March 2006, the most controversial changes of Rechtschreibreform were reverted. Therefore German media outlets which had formerly opposed the changes began to use the new spelling.

=== Greek ===
The classical, medieval, and early modern polytonic orthography inherited archaisms from Ancient Greek, which have been eliminated or simplified in the modern monotonic orthography. See also Katharevousa.

=== Indonesian ===
Indonesian underwent spelling reforms in 1947 and 1972, after which its spelling was more consistent with the form of the language spoken in Malaysia (i.e. Malaysian).

Old spelling	New spelling
oe	u
tj	c
dj	j
é	e
j	y
nj	ny
sj	sy
ch	kh

The first of these changes (oe to u) occurred around the time of independence in 1947; all of the others were a part of an officially mandated spelling reform in 1972. Some of the old spellings, which were more closely derived from the Dutch language, still survive in proper names.

=== Japanese ===
The original Japanese kana syllabaries were a purely phonetic representation used for writing the Japanese language when they were invented around 800 AD as a simplification of Chinese-derived kanji characters. However, the syllabaries were not completely codified and alternate letterforms, or hentaigana, existed for many sounds until standardization in 1900. In addition, due to linguistic drift the pronunciation of many Japanese words changed, mostly in a systematic way, from the classical Japanese language as spoken when the kana syllabaries were invented. Despite this, words continued to be spelled in kana as they were in classical Japanese, reflecting the classic rather than the modern pronunciation, until a Cabinet order in 1946 officially adopted spelling reform, making the spelling of words purely phonetic (with only 3 sets of exceptions) and dropping characters that represented sounds no longer used in the language.

=== Malay ===
Malay underwent spelling reforms in 1972, after which its spelling was more consistent with the form of the language spoken in Indonesia (i.e. Indonesian).

Old spelling	New spelling
ă	e
ch	c
ĕ	e
ï	i
sh	sy
th	s

These changes were a part of an officially mandated spelling reform in 1972. Some of the old spellings, which were more closely derived from the English language, still survive in proper names.

=== Norwegian ===
Before Norway became independent in 1905, the Norwegian language was written in Danish with minor characteristic regionalisms and idioms. After independence, there were spelling reforms in 1907, 1917, 1938, 1941, 1981 and 2005, reflecting the tug-of-war between the spelling preferred by traditionalists and reformers, depending on social class, urbanization, ideology, education and dialect. The 2005 reform reintroduced traditional spellings which had been abolished by earlier spelling reforms. Seldom-used spellings were also excluded.

=== Portuguese ===
The medieval spelling of Portuguese was mostly phonemic, but, from the Renaissance on, many authors who admired classical culture began to use an etymological orthography. However, spelling reforms in Portugal (1911) and Brazil (1943) reverted the orthography to phonemic principles (with some etymological distinctions maintained). Later reforms (Brazil, 1971; Portugal, 1945 and 1973) have aimed mainly at three goals: to eliminate the few remnants of redundant etymological spelling, to reduce the number of words marked with diacritics and hyphens, and to bring the Brazilian spelling standard and the Portuguese spelling standard (used in all the Portuguese speaking countries, except Brazil) closer to each other.

The goal of unifying the spelling was finally achieved with a multi-lateral agreement in 1990, signed by every Portuguese-speaking country, but not ratified by Angola as of 2014. The implementation of the new rules in Brazil and Portugal began only in 2009, with a transition period of six years. The agreement is used by the government and the teaching realms, as well as many of the press and publishing houses of both countries, and by state-related institutions. Because Portuguese in Portugal differs from Brazilian Portuguese, the reform has led to new differences in spellings which were formerly the same.

None of the other Portuguese speaking countries that have signed the agreement have implemented it as of 2014. In Portugal there is still some resistance to it and in 2013 the Portuguese Parliament formed a workgroup to analyse the situation and propose solutions.

During the transition period, four spellings will coexist: the official Portuguese spelling before the reform (used in all Portuguese speaking countries in Africa, Asia and Oceania, as used in Portugal by the people), the official Brazilian spelling before the reform (used in Brazil only), the Portuguese spelling after the reform (used by the government and its institutions, some media and publishers in translated books), and the Brazilian spelling after the reform (used by the government, media and publishers in translated books). The latter two systems are regulated by the same agreement, but differ somewhat because of differing pronunciation of the same words in Portugal and Brazil.

=== Russian ===
Over time, there have been a number of changes in spelling. They mostly involved the elimination of the (purely etymological) Greek letters that had been retained in the Cyrillic script by reason of ecclesiastical tradition, and those rendered obsolete by changes in phonetics.

When Peter I introduced his "civil script" (гражданский шрифт, graždanskij šrift) in 1708, based on more Western-looking letter shapes, spelling was simplified as well.

The most recent major reform of Russian spelling was carried out shortly after the Russian Revolution. The Russian orthography was simplified by eliminating four obsolete letters (ѣ, і, ѵ, and ѳ) and the archaic usage of the letter ъ (called yer, or hard sign) at the ends of words, which had originally represented a vowel with a sound similar to schwa, but had become silent by the Middle Ages.

=== South Slavic languages ===
Within the South Slavic languages, which form a dialect continuum, the Serbo-Croatian language itself consists of four literary standards: Serbian, Croatian, Bosnian and Montenegrin. It went through a series of major spelling reforms in the early to middle 19th century. Before then, two distinct writing traditions had evolved. Western dialects had been written using the Latin alphabet, while eastern (Serbian) had been using an archaic form of the Cyrillic script. Despite many attempts, there was no universally agreed-upon spelling standard employing the Latin alphabet, and the Cyrillic version was considered outdated.

A series of reforms have been undertaken to set the standards, in order to bring the writing system to parity with spoken language. The reform movement was spearheaded by Croatian linguist Ljudevit Gaj for the Latin-based writing system, and Serbian reformer Vuk Stefanović Karadžić for the Cyrillic version.

The reform efforts were coordinated in order to correlate the two writing systems, culminating in the Vienna Literary Agreement which has remained in service since. The Slovene language, not part of the Serbo-Croatian dialect continuum, was also covered by the same reform movement. After World War II and the codification of literary Macedonian, the same system has been extended with some modifications.

All of these writing systems exhibit a high degree of correspondence between language sounds and letters, making them highly phonetic and very consistent.

=== Spanish ===
The Spanish Royal Academy (RAE) reformed the orthographical rules of Spanish from 1726 to 1815, resulting in most of the modern conventions. There have been initiatives since then to further reform the spelling of Spanish: from the mid-19th century, Andrés Bello succeeded in making his proposal official in several South American countries, but they later returned to the standard of the Spanish Royal Academy.

Another initiative, the Rational Phonetic Hispanoamerican Orthography (Ortografía Fonética Rasional Ispanoamericana), remained a curiosity. Juan Ramón Jiménez proposed changing -ge- and -gi to -je- and -ji, but this is applied only in editions of his works or his wife's. Gabriel García Márquez raised the issue of reform during a congress at Zacatecas, and drew attention to the issue, but no changes were made. However, the academies continue to update the reform.

=== Other languages ===
- Armenian: See Spelling reform of the Armenian language 1922–1924.
- Bengali: Ishwar Chandra Vidyasagar removed archaic letters used for writing Sanskrit loanwords (ৠ, ঌ, ৡ, ৱ) and added three new letters (ড়, ঢ়, য়) to reflect contemporary Bengali pronunciation.
- Catalan: The spelling of the Catalan language was standardized, mostly by Pompeu Fabra in the early 20th century. In 2016 the official regulating bodies of the language, the Institute for Catalan Studies and the Valencian Language Academy, published a controversial spelling reform that eliminated some diacritical marks. Both spellings coexisted between 2016 and 2020, when the new spelling became the only acceptable one.
- Chinese: Simplified Chinese characters replaced traditional characters in Mainland China, Malaysia and Singapore, although traditional characters are still used in Taiwan, Hong Kong and Macau.
- Czech: The spelling of the Czech language was reformed and regularised as early as the 15th century through the publication of the manuscript Orthographia bohemica.
- Danish: There were spelling reforms to the Danish orthography in 1872 and 1889 (with some changes in 1892). In a 1948 reform, the Danish language abandoned the capitalization of common nouns (originally a German-inspired rule) to align with the other Scandinavian languages. At the same time, the digraph Aa/aa was abandoned in favor of the Swedish letter Å/å. The double-a digraph is still widely used in personal names and is optional in a few placenames. In 1980, W was recognized as a distinct letter. Before that, it was considered a variation of V for purposes of collation.
- Dhivehi: Replaced writing Arabic loanwords in Arabic script to thikijehi thaana, 20th century.
- Filipino: See Filipino orthography.
- Galician: See Reintegrationism.
- Georgian: In the 19th century the Georgian alphabet underwent removal of five letters (ჱ, ჳ, ჲ, ჴ, ჵ).
- Greenlandic: The spelling reform of 1973 replaced the letter kra (Kʼ / ĸ) by Q and removed diacritics by changing a number of spelling conventions.
- Hebrew: The Hebrew language has two systems of spelling – with and without vowel marks, called Niqqud. Niqqud is used consistently only in books for children, poetry, and some textbooks and religious literature. Most other texts are usually written without vowel marks. The Academy of the Hebrew Language publishes rules for both vocalized and unvocalized spelling. The latest major revision to the rules of unvocalized spelling were published in 1996, although in practice they are not mandatory. To date there is no standard spelling for unvocalized Hebrew, and many Hebrew speakers spell according to their own instinct and custom. See Hebrew spelling.
- Korean: The hangul alphabet completely replaced hanja ideograms in the Korean language in the North, while hanja still sees very limited use for clarification and abbreviation in the South.
- Lao: The spelling reform of 1975 discarded many etymological spellings and replaced them by phonetic ones.
- Latvian: Old versions of Latvian orthography were German-based, they were replaced by a more appropriate system at the beginning of the 20th century. The Latvian language discarded the digraph Uo in 1914, the letters Ō and Ŗ in 1946, and the digraph Ch in 1957.
- Polish: See History of Polish orthography.
- Quechua and Aymara: See Quechuan and Aymaran spelling shift.
- Swedish: The last major reform of Swedish orthography occurred in 1906. It homogenized the spelling of /v/ and changed the adverbial and neuter adjectival ending -dt to -t or -tt depending on the length of the preceding vowel. The phrase hvarken af silfver eller rödt guld was now spelled varken av silver eller rött guld. Some people, particularly teachers, had called for an even more radical reform that would also homogenise the spellings of the /j/, /ɕ/, /ɧ/ and /ɔ/ sounds, which to this day remain highly diverse in Swedish, and replace the ck letter sequence with kk. These more radical reforms met opposition from linguists at an early stage.
- Thai: The two letters "ฃ" and "ฅ" were discarded in 1892, being uniformly replaced by "ข" and "ค", respectively. A more extensive spelling reform was carried out in 1942, which eliminated a larger number of letters and altered the spelling of several words, but was abandoned shortly after in 1944.
- Turkish: The Turkish alphabet replaced the Ottoman Turkish script in the Turkish language.
- Venetian: The Venetian language has never had an official orthography, because it was considered a dialect until recent times, and also now many do not consider it as a "distinct" language. Many other languages of Italy are in the same situation. Regardless, there are some attempts to establish a standard orthography for Venetian, like the Grafia Veneta Unitaria ("shared Venetian spelling"), a spelling created by a committee convened by the region Veneto in 1995.
- Vietnamese: In the Vietnamese language, the Vietnamese alphabet replaced the earlier Chữ Nôm system in the 1920s.

== See also ==
- False etymology
- Language change
- Language planning
- Language policy
- Language reform
- Official script
- Otto Basler
- Simplified Chinese characters
