= Christopher Upward =

Christopher Upward (14 November 1938 – 4 August 2002) was an English orthographer, notable for designing the system of Cut Spelling, a system of English-language spelling reform which reduces redundant letters and makes substitutions to improve correspondence with the spoken word, as well as for the book The History of English Spelling, which was unfinished at the time of his death, but was completed by George Davidson and published posthumously in 2011.

== Biography ==
Upward was born in 1938 in London, to the novelist and schoolmaster Edward Upward (1903–2009) and his wife Hilda (née Percival; 1909–1995), also a schoolteacher. He was named after his father's friend Christopher Isherwood. He graduated from his father's old college, Corpus Christi College, Cambridge, in 1961, and went on to lecture at Aston University from 1970 until his retirement in 1995. He was diagnosed with multiple sclerosis early in life and died in Birmingham from complications of the disease in 2002, aged 63.
