= English Spelling Society =

British organisation

The English Spelling Society is an international organisation based in the United Kingdom, founded in 1908 as the Simplified Spelling Society. It primarily aims to raise awareness of problems caused by English spelling's irregularity and to improve literacy and reduce learning costs, including through the use of a spelling reform. The Society publishes leaflets, newsletters, journals, books, and bulletins. Its spokespeople feature regularly on TV, radio, and in print.

== Structure ==
The Society is based in the United Kingdom, but has a worldwide membership, including Ireland, the United States, Canada, Australia and New Zealand. It is governed by a committee elected at its Annual General Meeting. The Society maintains links with the American Literacy Council, which has similar objectives.

== Aims ==
The English Spelling Society primarily aims to make known the problems caused by English spelling's irregularity in an effort to improve literacy and reduce learning costs, including through the use of spelling reform. It also wishes to raise awareness of the alphabetic principle and its "corruption during the long history of written English" and to prepare a graded set of proposals for a more regular English orthography.

The Society believes that both recent research and the continuing governmental concern about literacy rates in the English-speaking world strengthen its position. In particular, it points to evidence that Anglophone children have a harder time learning to read and write than do Italian children. It also quotes evidence that dyslexia is less of a problem in Italy and linguistically similar countries which have more phonemic writing systems than English. Finally, it points to a recent study by the KPMG Foundation that estimates the total costs to the public purse till age 37 arising from failure to read in the primary school years at £1.73 billion to £2.05 billion a year.

== Specific reform systems ==
As of September 2021, the Society has not endorsed any specific alternative English spelling system. However, through its "Personal View" series, it provides a forum for authors of alternative systems to publish their work and submit them to peer review. The forum includes resources for Simpel-Fonetik and SoundSpel, among others. Its listed proposals vary in their recommendations from regularising only a few words to making English almost completely phonemically written.

In the November 1983 edition of the Society's newsletter, it printed a five-part reform proposal known as Stage 1. One of these was Spelling Reform 1 (SR1), a proposal by Harry Lindgren. In April 1984, SR1 was adopted as the Society's house style at its yearly meeting. The Society said that the newsletter's proposed reforms could be used either together or individually (as a step-by-step change).

In April 2021, Stephen Linstead's Traditional Spelling Revised (TSR) was approved by the International English Spelling Congress as the best alternative to English Orthography. The Society, sponsor of the Congress, is affording TSR a degree of support and publicity.

== Spelling bee protests ==
Protesters from the Society have regularly taken good-humoured action against orthodox English spelling and its promotion (e.g. by demonstrating, most conspicuously in the form of "BeeMan", at the annual Scripps National Spelling Bee in Washington, D.C.).

== Presidents ==
The Society has had eight presidents to date since its creation in 1908. With the exception of the politician Sir James Pitman, all of the presidents have been academics.

Years active	Length of presidency (years)	President	Background
1908–1911	3	Walter William Skeat	Philology
1911–1946	35	Gilbert Murray	Classics
1946–1968	22	Daniel Jones	Phonetics
1968–1972	4	Sir James Pitman	Pedagogy (not academic)
1972–1987	15	John Downing	Educational psychology
1988–2003	15	Donald Scragg	Anglo-Saxon studies
2003–2013	10	John C. Wells	Phonetics
2013–present	12 (as of 2025)	Anatoly Liberman	Germanic philology

== Books ==
- Jolly Dictionary—Sue Lloyd and Sara Wernham
- Future of Fonics—Isobel Raven
- Spelling for the 21st century—Sanford S. Silverman
- Spelling Dearest (The Down and Dirty, Nitty-Gritty History of English Spelling)—Niall McLeod Waldman
- The Book of Spells & Misspells—Valerie Yule
- Lets End Our Literacy Crisis—Bob C. Cleckler

== See also ==
- List of reforms of the English language
- Orthography
- Spelling reform
- Defective script
- "The Chaos" (poem demonstrating irregular English spelling)
- Linguistic conservatism
- Linguistic prescription
- Traditional Spelling Revised
