= Simplified Spelling Board =

American spelling reform organization

- Formation: April 1, 1906
- Dissolved: 1920
- Headquarters: New York City
- Members: 30

The Simplified Spelling Board was an American organization created in 1906 to reform the spelling of the English language, making it simpler and easier to learn, and eliminating many of its inconsistencies. The board operated until 1920, the year after the death of its founding benefactor, who had come to criticize the progress and approach of the organization.

== Founding ==
The Simplified Spelling Board was announced on March 11, 1906, with Andrew Carnegie funding the organization, to be headquartered in New York City. The New York Times noted that Carnegie was convinced that "English might be made the world language of the future" and an influence leading to universal peace, but that this role was obstructed by its "contradictory and difficult spelling". Carnegie committed $15,000 per year for five years to initiate the organization. Then he provided $25,000 a year and recruited advocates.

The initial 30 members of the Board included:

- E. Benjamin Andrews chancellor of the University of Nebraska
- Orlando Cullen Blackmer, publisher
- David J. Brewer justice of the Supreme Court of the United States
- Nicholas Murray Butler, president of Columbia University
- Andrew Carnegie, philanthropist
- Melvil Dewey, inventor of the Dewey Decimal Classification
- Isaac K. Funk, editor and publisher of The Standard Dictionary
- Lyman J. Gage, former United States Secretary of the Treasury
- Richard Watson Gilder, editor of The Century Magazine
- William Torrey Harris, United States Commissioner of Education and editor of Webster's International Dictionary
- George Hempl, professor at the University of Michigan
- Thomas Wentworth Higginson
- Henry Holt, publisher
- William James, professor at Harvard University
- David Starr Jordan, president of Leland Stanford University
- Thomas Lounsbury, professor at Yale University
- Francis March professor at Lafayette College
- Brander Matthews professor at Columbia University
- William W. Morrow, United States circuit judge
- Charles P. G. Scott, etymological editor of the Century Dictionary
- Homer H. Seerley, president of Iowa State Normal School
- Benjamin Eli Smith, editor of the Century Dictionary
- Charles E. Sprague, president of the Union Dime Savings Institution
- Calvin Thomas of Columbia University
- Mark Twain (Samuel Clemens), author
- E. O. Vaile
- William Hayes Ward, editor of The Independent
- Robert Simpson Woodward, president of the Carnegie Institution of Washington

Offices were located at the Metropolitan Life Building at 1 Madison Avenue, and Brander Matthews was selected as the board's chairman.

Charles E. Sprague of the Union Dime Savings Institution, the board's first treasurer, noted that the group was careful to keep the word "reform" out of its name and gave the word "believe" as an example of a word that would benefit from elimination of its unneeded "i", stating that "If believe were spelled 'beleve', I think it would be a good change."

On March 13, 1906, The New York Times editorialized in support of the Simplified Spelling Board's efforts, noting that 90% of English words are "fairly well spelled", but that "a vast improvement could be effected by reducing to some sort of regularity the much-used tenth that makes most of the trouble". An editorial in the following day's edition noted that opponents of the board's efforts had suggested that the language be kept as is, only taught better, but that the members of the board would respect the language's history in its improvement efforts without hiding or distorting it. Brander Matthews, the board's chairman, emphasized that the board's primary mission in simplifying the language was to eliminate unneeded letters, noting that "[s]implification by omission – this is its platform; this is its motto". Funk wrote to The Times on March 20, 1906, emphasizing that the board's first aim was "a conservatively progressive evolution, aiming chiefly at the dropping of silent letters", accelerating a process that had been going on for centuries. This would be followed by the use of a phonetic alphabet developed by the American Philological Association and including the 40 basic sounds used in English. Phonetics would be taught to children in nursery school or kindergarten.

== First 300 words ==
The board's initial list of 300 words was published on April 1, 1906. Much of the list included words ending with -ed changed to end -t ("addressed", "caressed", "missed", "possessed" and "wished", becoming "addresst", "carest", "mist", "possest" and "wisht", respectively). Other changes included removal of silent letters ("catalogue" to "catalog"), changing -re endings to -er ("calibre" and "sabre" to "caliber" and "saber"), changing "ough" to "o" to represent the long vowel sound in the new words altho, tho and thoro, and changes to represent the "z" sound with that letter, where "s" had been used ("brasen" and "surprise" becoming "brazen" and "surprize"). Digraphs would also be eliminated, with the board promoting such spellings as "anemia", "anesthesia", "archeology", "encyclopedia" and "orthopedic".

The board noted that the majority of the words in their list were already preferred by three current dictionaries: Webster's (more than half), the Century (60%) and the Standard (two-thirds). In June 1906, the board prepared a list of the 300 words designed for teachers, lecturers and writers, which was sent out upon request.

In June 1906, the New York City Board of Education received a report from the Board of Superintendents recommending adoption of the 300-word list, and would pass on the recommendation to the Committee on Studies and Textbooks for approval.

In August 1906, President of the United States Theodore Roosevelt had supported the plan, signing an executive order at his home in Oyster Bay, New York, mandating the use of reformed spelling in his official communications and messages to Congress. Prof. Matthews stated that he had received no advance notice of the President's order and had been taken by surprise when it was issued.

Roosevelt tried to force the federal government to adopt the system, sending an order to the Public Printer to use the system in all public federal documents. The order was obeyed; among the many documents printed using the system was the President's special message regarding the Panama Canal.

The New York Times noted that the New York State Commissioner of Education thought the state would not support the board's proposal as "he did not believe that the State educational department should tell the people how they must spell". By August 1906, the board reported that over 5,000 individuals had pledged to use the words on the initial list, with another 500 to 600 agreeing to use some of the words, but objecting to others.

The press in the United States and the United Kingdom ridiculed the "reform spelling crusade", and editorials and cartoons abounded. The Louisville Courier-Journal published an article which stated: "Nuthing escapes Mr. Rucevelt. No subject is tu hi fr him to takl, nor tu lo for him to notis. He makes tretis without the consent of the Senit." The Baltimore Sun joked: "How will he spell his own name? Will he make it 'Rusevelt' or will he get down to the fact and spell it 'Butt-in-sky'?" One editorial summed it up this way: "This is 2 mutch." Overseas, while the London press viciously mocked the executive order, the board received a significant spike in interest in the word list following Roosevelt's edict.

In response to mounting criticism from British newspapers, the board announced the additions of James Murray, the Scottish lexicographer and primary editor of the Oxford English Dictionary, along with Joseph Wright, an Oxford University professor of comparative philology and editor of the English Dialect Dictionary. Combined with the earlier naming of Walter William Skeat, editor of the Etymological English Dictionary, the board could claim it had the three top English language dictionaries from both the United States and United Kingdom on its side.

The Supreme Court directed that its opinions should be printed in the old style.

Finally, Congress had the last word when Representative Charles B. Landis of Indiana, Chairman of the House Committee on Printing, introduced a resolution on December 13, 1906: "Resolved, That it is the sense of the House that hereafter in the printing of House documents or other publications used by law or ordered by Congress, or either branch thereof, or emanating from any executive department or bureau of the Government, the House printer should observe and adhere to the standard of orthography prescribed in generally accepted dictionaries of the English language." The motion passed unanimously. The President let the Public Printer and the Nation know that the old style was reinstated.

Roosevelt ultimately decided to rescind the order. Brander Matthews, a friend of Roosevelt and one of the chief advocates of the reform as chairman of the Simplified Spelling Board, remonstrated with him for abandoning the effort. Roosevelt replied on December 16, 1906: "I could not by fighting have kept the new spelling in, and it was evidently worse than useless to go into an undignified contest when I was beaten. Do you know that the one word as to which I thought the new spelling was wrong – thru – was more responsible than anything else for our discomfiture?" Next summer Roosevelt was watching a naval review when a press boat marked "Pres Bot" chugged ostentatiously by. The President waved and laughed with delight.

== Carnegie's dissatisfaction ==
Carnegie, the founding and major benefactor of the board, disagreed with its chosen approach of prescribing recommended changes. Rather, he believed that the board would be more productive by encouraging grass-roots changes. His beliefs are contained in a statement given to an editor of The Times: "Amended spellings can only be submitted for general acceptance. It is the people who decide what is to be adopted or rejected." For their part, some members of the board believed that Carnegie was too meddlesome in its business.

Signs of a break with the board were apparent as early as January 1915. Carnegie received a letter from Matthews, which included a list of daily newspapers that had adopted the reformed spellings. Carnegie was not impressed. In reply, Carnegie wrote, "Please note, not one Eastern paper. I see no change in New York and I am getting very tired indeed, of sinking twenty-five thousand dollars a year for nothing here in the East." Carnegie was further irritated to learn that his own trusts' annual financial reports were seen to be taking "a step backwards in reference to spelling."

One month later, in February 1915, Carnegie penned a letter to Holt, the president of the board. In this letter, he wrote that "A more useless body of men never came into association, judging from the effects they produce. [...] Instead of taking twelve words and urging their adoption, they undertook radical changes from the start and these they can never make ...." Using spelling that demonstrated his own continuing attachment to certain reforms, Carnegie added, "I think I hav been patient long enuf ... I hav much better use for twenty thousand dollars a year."

== Dissolution ==
It was always a condition that Carnegie's dollars had to be matched by results, and at his death in August 1919, his will contained no provision for the Simplified Spelling Board. Without that source of funds (a total of $283,000 over the 14 years), the board's operations ceased in 1920, the year it had published its Handbook of Simplified Spelling.

== Handbook of Simplified Spelling ==
In 1920, the SSB published a Handbook of Simplified Spelling, which was written wholly in reformed spelling.

Part 1 is a brief outline of the history of English spelling and the attempts to reform it up until 1920. Part 2 presents the arguments in favor of reform and replies to the objections that are commonly made. Part 3 contains the SSB's proposed rules for simplified spelling and a list of the words that would be changed by them.

The handbook repeated and explained the SSB's plan of "gradual" rather than "sudden" reform. It noted that previous spelling changes had come into use gradually—"so gradually, in fact, that at all times (as today) ther hav been, and ar, many words speld in more than one way on equal authority of good usage". It also noted that most reformed spellings that had come into general use were originally the deliberate act of a lone writer, who was followed at first by a small minority. Thus, it encouraged people to "point the way" and "set the example" by using the reformed spellings whenever they can. The handbook used and set forth the following rules:

Existing spelling	Rule	Examples
AE (Æ) and OE (Œ) pronounced /ɛ/	use E	aesthetic→esthetic, foetus→fetus, alumnae (unchanged)
BT pronounced /t/	use T	debt→det, doubt→dout
–CEED	use –CEDE	exceed→excede, proceed→procede
CH pronounced /k/	drop silent H except before E, I, Y	character→caracter, school→scool chemist, architect, monarchy (unchanged)
final double consonant	drop the last letter, but with –LL only after a short vowel, and with –SS only in monosyllables	add→ad, bill→bil, bluff→bluf, doll→dol, egg→eg, glass→glas, loss→los But retain double consonant in all, roll, needless, a.s.f.
double consonant before silent –E	drop the last two letters	bagatelle→bagatel, bizarre→bizar, cigarette→cigaret, giraffe→giraf, gramme→gram
silent or misleading –E	drop the E	are→ar, give→giv, have→hav, were→wer, gone→gon, examine→examin, practise→practis, definite→definit, active→activ, involve→involv, serve→serv, achieve→achiev, leave→leav, freeze→freez, gauze→gauz, sleeve→sleev
EA pronounced /ɛ/	use E	head→hed
EA pronounced /ɑ/	use A	heart→hart
EAU and EAUX pronounced /əʊ/	use O	bureau→buro
–ED pronounced /d/	use –D, reduce any foregoing doubled consonant to a single letter	answered→anserd, called→cald, carried→carrid, preferred→preferd, wronged→wrongd. Do not make this change if the spelling suggests an incorrect pronunciation: bribed not bribd; used not usd, a.s.f.
–ED pronounced /t/	use –T, reduce any foregoing doubled consonant to a single letter, change CED/SCED to ST	asked→askt, advanced→advanst. Do not make this change if the spelling suggests an incorrect pronunciation: baked not bakt; hoped not hopt, a.s.f.
EI pronounced /iː/	use IE	conceit→conciet, deceive→deciev
–EY pronounced /iː/	use –Y	chimney→chimny, money→mony
GH pronounced /f/	use F, drop the silent letter in the foregoing digraph	cough→cof, laugh→laf, enough→enuf
GH pronounced /ɡ/	use G	aghast→agast, ghost→gost
–GM pronounced /m/	use M	apothegm→apothem, paradigm→paradim
–GUE after a consonant, a short vowel or a digraph representing a long vowel or diphthong	drop silent –UE	catalogue→catalog, league→leag, prologue→prolog tongue→tung But not in rogue, vague, a.s.f.
–ISE and –YSE pronounced /aɪz/	use –IZE	advertise→advertize, analyse→analize, rise→rize
–MB after a short vowel	use M	bomb→bom, crumb→crum But not after a long vowel as in comb, tomb, a.s.f.
–OE pronounced /oʊ/	drop silent E, except in inflected forms	foe→fo, hoe→ho foes, hoed (unchanged)
OEU pronounced /uː/	use U	manoeuvre→maneuver
OUL pronounced /əʊl/	use OL, except in "soul"	boulder→bolder, mould→mold
–OUGH	use O/U/OCK/UP according to pronunciation	although→altho, borough→boro, doughnut→donut, thorough→thoro, through→thru, hough→hock, hiccough→hiccup. though→tho For plough write plow, but not bow for bough.
–OUR pronounced /ər/	use –OR	colour→color, flavour→flavor
PH pronounced /f/	use F	alphabet→alfabet, telephone→telefone
–RE after any consonant except C	use –ER	centre→center, metre→meter. But retain –RE in lucre, mediocre.
RH– pronounced /r/	use R	rhetoric→retoric, rhubarb→rubarb
RRH pronounced /r/	use R	hemorrhage→hemorage
silent S between I and L	drop silent S	island→iland
SC– pronounced /s/	use S	scenery→senery, scissors→sissors
–SQUE pronounced /sk/	use –SK	burlesque→burlesk
silent U before a vowel	drop silent U	guard→gard, guess→ges, guide→gide
Y between consonants	use I	analysis→analisis, type→tipe
YOU pronounced /jʌ/	use YU	your→yur, young→yung

The handbook also suggested the following spelling changes, which are not covered by the above rules: acre→aker, answer→anser, beleaguer→beleager, campaign→campain, counterfeit→counterfit, delight→delite, foreign→foren, forfeit→forfit, friend→frend, masquerade→maskerade, mortgage→morgage, receipt→reciet, sieve→siv, sleight→slight, sovereign→sovren, sprightly→spritely, touch→tuch, yeoman→yoman.

== See also ==
- Clarence G. Child
- Simplified Spelling Society
- Spelling Reform 1 (SR1)
- Traditional Spelling Revised
