= Phonemic orthography =

Orthography in which the graphemes correspond to the phonemes of the language

Sample of text written in the Shavian alphabet, a proposed phonemic orthography for English

A phonemic orthography is an orthography in which the graphemes correspond consistently to the language's phonemes, or more generally to the language's diaphonemes. Phonemic orthographies have the lowest possible level of orthographic depth, as they have exact grapheme-to-phoneme correspondence.

For a systemic analysis of the phoneme/grapheme correspondence, Petr Sgall distinguishes two conditions, both of which are to be satisfied for a phonemic orthography:

- in any context, a given grapheme is pronounced as the same phoneme ("uniqueness of pronunciation")
- in any context, a given phoneme is written with the same grapheme ("uniqueness of spelling")

== Phonetic orthography ==
In the past, the term phonetic orthography was used to refer to various proposals of phonetic English-language spelling reforms, e.g. by J.I.D. Hinds or Tobias Witmer.

On the other hand, Morris Swadesh defined "phonetic orthography" or "phonetic alphabet" as a writing system to make a phonetic record using symbols for "selected characteristic points in the total range of possible speech sounds", which is more commonly referred to as "phonetic transcription".

== See also ==
- Alphabetic principle
- Defective script
- Hangul
- Phonetic transcription
- Spelling
- Morphophonology
- Orthographic depth
- Orthographic transcription
