= Traditional Spelling Revised =

Proposed English language spelling reform

Traditional Spelling Revised (TSR) is a conservative English-language spelling reform which seeks to apply the underlying rules of English orthography more consistently. It was created by Stephen Linstead and chosen by the International English Spelling Congress (IESC) as the preferred alternative to English orthography in March 2021.

The English Spelling Society, sponsor of the congress, afforded TSR a degree of support and publicity which was due to be reviewed in March 2025. TSR has consequently been mentioned several times in the media.

== Changes ==
TSR is broadly spelt the same as traditional English orthography, but some rules and spellings are applied more consistently.

=== 'Magic e' rule ===
Where a single consonant separates a vowel and a silent word final e, the first vowel is 'lengthened'. Unlike the doubling rule, the consonant is not doubled when 'lengthening' is undesired. Instead, the 'magic e' is dropped (unless it indicates soft or hard ⟨c⟩ or ⟨g⟩, then the consonant is doubled).

- e.g. ⟨win⟩ / ⟨wine⟩, ⟨sad⟩ / ⟨sadist⟩, ⟨bit⟩ / ⟨biter⟩, ⟨fun⟩ / ⟨fuming⟩

The graphemes ⟨ar⟩ and ⟨or⟩ do not straightforwardly take on the "lengthened" forms. Instead ⟨-are⟩ represents /ɛər/ and ⟨-ore⟩ is unchanged.

=== Doubling rule ===
The doubling rule dictates that when a stressed vowel is followed by a single consonant and another vowel (which isn't 'magic e'), the stressed vowel is 'lengthened'. This can be negated by doubling the consonant between the two vowels, thus keeping the vowel short. Therefore letters are dropped or doubled from traditional spelling.

- e.g. ⟨swim⟩ → ⟨swimming⟩ but ⟨fail⟩ → ⟨failed⟩
- e.g. ⟨accommodate⟩ → ⟨acommodate⟩, ⟨committee⟩ → ⟨comittee⟩
- e.g. ⟨deddicate⟩, ⟨edducate⟩, ⟨perrish⟩

Doubled ⟨g⟩ before ⟨e⟩ may be spelt ⟨dg⟩ or ⟨gg⟩ to indicate whether it is soft or not.

- e.g. ⟨flange⟩ → ⟨flandge⟩, ⟨hanger⟩ → ⟨hangger⟩

There is an exception for the letter ⟨i⟩, which does not lengthen itself unless it is part of the ⟨-ing⟩ suffix.

- e.g. ⟨lipid⟩, ⟨limit⟩ but ⟨wining⟩, ⟨winning⟩

=== Disambiguation of graphemes ===
Where graphemes ambiguously represent more than one sound, they are rewritten to be less ambiguous.

- e.g. ⟨ow⟩ represents completely different sounds in the words ⟨low⟩ and ⟨town⟩, so TSR uses ⟨ow⟩ for /aʊ/ and rewrites the other spellings thus: ⟨low⟩ → ⟨lo⟩, ⟨own⟩ → ⟨oan⟩.

=== Silent letters ===
Where letters are rendundant to pronunciation, they are removed. This includes uses of word-final e that suggest "lengthening" when there is none (unless it suggests soft c as in ⟨office⟩). The homographs that this creates are distinguished using apostrophes, hyphens or diaereses.

- e.g. ⟨wrong⟩ → ⟨rong⟩, ⟨gnash⟩ → ⟨nash⟩
- e.g. ⟨love⟩ → ⟨luv⟩, ⟨dove⟩ → ⟨duv⟩, ⟨live⟩ → ⟨liv⟩
- e.g. ⟨hour⟩ → ⟨'our⟩, ⟨write⟩ → ⟨'rite⟩, ⟨know⟩ → ⟨'no⟩, ⟨create⟩ → ⟨cre-ate⟩ / ⟨creäte⟩
- e.g. ⟨though⟩ → ⟨tho⟩, ⟨through⟩ → ⟨throo⟩

Importantly, the following spellings are not redundant to pronunciation.

- ⟨easy⟩ not ⟨esy⟩, ⟨high⟩ not ⟨hi⟩, ⟨letter⟩ not ⟨letr⟩, ⟨lie⟩ not ⟨li⟩, ⟨pack⟩ not ⟨pak⟩, ⟨switch⟩ not ⟨swich⟩
- Silent ⟨g⟩ is retained to preserve the long vowel: ⟨benign⟩, ⟨design⟩, ⟨sign⟩
- Silent ⟨gh⟩: ⟨high⟩, ⟨bough⟩, ⟨bought⟩, ⟨eight⟩
- Change ⟨gh⟩ /f/ to ⟨ff⟩: ⟨coff⟩, ⟨enuff⟩, ⟨laff⟩
- Retain ⟨ph⟩ /f/: ⟨phone⟩

=== Homophones ===
There are cases in which spellings of homophones will not merge (and therefore not be disambiguated using an apostrophe). Some phonemes have several different permitted spellings, which helps to distinguish homophones visually.

- e.g. ⟨main⟩ / ⟨mane⟩, ⟨buy⟩ / ⟨by⟩ / ⟨bye⟩, ⟨stare⟩ / ⟨stair⟩, ⟨sight⟩ / ⟨site⟩ / ⟨cite⟩, ⟨none⟩ / ⟨nun⟩, ⟨scene⟩ / ⟨seen⟩, ⟨tail⟩ / ⟨tale⟩

Some words are respelt where an alternate spelling can be used instead of an apostrophe. However, neither ⟨or⟩ / ⟨ore⟩ / ⟨oar⟩ nor ⟨pore⟩ / ⟨pour⟩ are differentiated.

- e.g. ⟨bear⟩ → ⟨bair⟩ (to distinguish from ⟨bare⟩), ⟨great⟩ → ⟨grait⟩ (to distinguish from ⟨grate⟩).

=== New graphemes ===
Two new letter combinations have been introduced to unambiguously represent /ɑː/ ⟨aa⟩ and /ʊ/ ⟨uu⟩.

== Exceptions ==
The spellings of some common words that do not otherwise comply with the rules of TSR are preserved so as not to drastically change the look of text. These exceptions, called "sign words" in the documentation, are given in groups, though not all the words in these groups are changed.

- personal pronouns and adjectives: I, you, he, she, we, me, us, they, your, their(s), them
- variations of verbs to be and to have: are, was, were, have, having
- names of numbers: none, once, one, two, four, seven, eleven, twelve, fourteen, seventeen
- days of the week: Monday, Wednesday, Saturday
- months and seasons of the year: January, February, April, July, Autumn
- demonstrative adjectives, pronouns and adverbs including ⟨th⟩: than, that, then, thence, there, these, this, those, thus
- interrogative pronouns beginning ⟨w⟩: what, where, who, whose
- other common words with unusual spellings: the, of, to(day/gether), any(one), (e)very, eye, nothing, some, with, woman, women, yes, either, (n)ever

Some common suffixes are retained.

- involving /ʃ/: -cean (ocean), -cial (special), -cian (musician), -cient (prescient), -cience (conscience), -cion (suspicion), -cious (spacious), -ssion (passion), -tial (partial), -tient (patient), -tion (nation), -sure, -ed
- involving /ʒ/: -sion (invasion), -sure (pleasure), -sual (casual)

Some common letter sequences, called "sub-groups" are retained even when irregular.

- ⟨-ald⟩ (bald), ⟨-alk⟩ (talk, walk), ⟨-alt⟩ (falter, halt), ⟨ange⟩ (danger, angel), ⟨-aste⟩ (taste, waste), ⟨-ign⟩ (benign, sign), ⟨-ind⟩ (find, mind), ⟨old⟩ (old, gold), ⟨-olk⟩ (folk, yolk), ⟨-ore⟩ (therefore, shore), ⟨-other⟩ (brother, mother), ⟨-ould⟩ (could, would), ⟨war-⟩ (warm, warn), ⟨wor-⟩ (worm, worst).

Proper nouns are kept the same, unless alternative spellings become accepted. Loan words are indicated in italics.

== Sound-to-spelling correspondences ==
Each phoneme has its own spelling patterns.

=== Vowels ===
Phoneme	Lexical set	Grapheme	Examples	Notes
/æ/	TRAP	a	pan, laff (Note: "laugh" in conventional spelling)	
/æ/	TRAP	(au)	aunt	c.f. ⟨ant⟩
/ɛ/	DRESS	e	pen, frend (Note: "friend" in conventional spelling)	
/ɛ/	DRESS	(a)	many	By association with ⟨any⟩
/ɛ/	DRESS	(ai)	again, against	No note in word list
/ɪ/	KIT	i	pin, bisness (Note: "business" in conventional spelling), pritty (Note: "pretty" in conventional spelling), sistem (Note: "system" in conventional spelling)	
/ɪ/	KIT	(o, e)	women	
/ɒ/	LOT	o	pot, wosh (Note: "wash" in conventional spelling)	
/ʌ/	STRUT	u	pun, cum (Note: "come" in conventional spelling)	
/ʌ/	STRUT	-other	another, brother	
/ʌ/	STRUT	(o-e)	none, nothing, some	
/eɪ/	FACE	a-e	face	
/eɪ/	FACE	ai	laid, braik (Note: "break" in conventional spelling), gaige (Note: "gauge" in conventional spelling), baiss (Note: "bass" in conventional spelling)	
/eɪ/	FACE	ei	vein	
/eɪ/	FACE	eigh	neigh	
/eɪ/	FACE	-ay	stay	
/eɪ/	FACE	-ey	they, survey	
/iː/	FLEECE	e-e	scene	
/iː/	FLEECE	ee	feed	
/iː/	FLEECE	ea	lead	"ea" /iː/ doesn't indicate /eɪ/ or /ɛ/: steak → staik, weapon → weppon.
/iː/	FLEECE	(e)	me, he, she, we	Usually /∅/, though /iː/ in monosyllables
/iː/	FLEECE	(ei)	either	Can also be pronounced with /aɪ/
/aɪ/	PRICE	i-e	side	
/aɪ/	PRICE	ie	die, iedeäl (Note: "ideal" in conventional spelling)	
/aɪ/	PRICE	-y	why	
/aɪ/	PRICE	-ye	dye	
/aɪ/	PRICE	-uy	buy	
/aɪ/	PRICE	-igh	sigh	
/aɪ/	PRICE	(aye)	aye	Would be /eɪ/ otherwise. Official respelling unknown.
/aɪ/	PRICE	(eye)	eye	Would be /iː/ otherwise. ⟨y⟩ and ⟨ie⟩ were suggested then rejected
/aɪ/	PRICE	(ei)	either	Can also be pronounced with /iː/
/oʊ/	GOAT	o-e	bone	
/oʊ/	GOAT	oa	moan	
/oʊ/	GOAT	-o	banjo	Many ⟨-ow⟩ forms are changed to ⟨-o⟩: low → lo, show → sho.
/oʊ/	GOAT	-oe	floe	
/juː/	DUE	u-e	tune	
/juː/	DUE	ue	due, buetiful (Note: "beautiful" in conventional spelling)	
/juː/	DUE	u-	unit	
/juː/	DUE	ew	few	
/juː/	DUE	eu	Europe	For words of Greek origin only
/ʊ/	FOOT	uu	stuud (Note: "stood" in conventional spelling), puuding (Note: "pudding" in conventional spelling)	
/ʊ/	FOOT	(oul)	could, should, would	Usually /aʊl/
/ʊ/	FOOT	(o)	woman	Usually /ɒ/
/ɔɪ/	CHOICE	oi	boil	
/ɔɪ/	CHOICE	oy	boy, deploying	
/uː/	GOOSE	oo	food, throo (Note: "through" in conventional spelling)	
/uː/	GOOSE	(u-e)	super	Usually /juː/
/aʊ/	MOUTH	ou	proud	
/aʊ/	MOUTH	ow	now, gown	
/aʊ/	MOUTH	ough	bough	
/ɛər/	SQUARE	air	stair, bair (Note: "bear" in conventional spelling)	
/ɛər/	SQUARE	-are	bare	
/ɛər/	SQUARE	eir	their	
/ɛər/	SQUARE	(ere)	there, where	Usually /ɪər/
/ɑːr/	START	ar	star	Double the ⟨r⟩ to change the vowel: ⟨harry⟩. "Harry" and "starry" don't rime.
/ɑː/	PALM	a	bath	Undisambiguated from /æ/
/ɑː/	PALM	al	palm	
/ɑː/	PALM	aa	faather (Note: "father" in conventional spelling), tomaato (Note: "tomato" in conventional spelling), vaaz (Note: "vase" in conventional spelling), draama (Note: "drama" in conventional spelling)	Used for British-American differences in pronunciation and ⟨faather⟩
/ɔːr/	NORTH, FORCE	or	or, for, bord (Note: "board" in conventional spelling)	Double the ⟨r⟩ to change the vowel: ⟨horrid⟩
/ɔːr/	NORTH, FORCE	(ore)	ore	Kept for contrast in a few words, but mostly respelled ⟨or⟩
/ɔːr/	NORTH, FORCE	(oar)	oar	Kept for contrast in a few words, but mostly respelled ⟨or⟩
/ɔːr/	NORTH, FORCE	(our)	four	Usually /aʊ.ə/
/ɔː/	THOUGHT	au	fraud	
/ɔː/	THOUGHT	aw	law, lawyer	
/ɔː/	THOUGHT	all	call	
/ɔː/	THOUGHT	al- and implying totality	always	cf. algebra
/ɔː/	THOUGHT	augh	daughter	
/ɔː/	THOUGHT	ough(t)	bought	
/ɜːr/	NURSE	er	her	Double the ⟨r⟩ to change the vowel: ⟨herring⟩, ⟨stirrup⟩, ⟨hurry⟩.
/ɜːr/	NURSE	ir	fir	
/ɜːr/	NURSE	ur	fur	
/ɜːr/	NURSE	(or)	word, work, worship	Usually /ɔː/
/ɪər/	NEAR	-eer	beer	
/ɪər/	NEAR	-ear	hear	
/ɪər/	NEAR	-ere	here	
/i/	happY	-y	fairy	
/i/	happY	-ie(s)	faries	⟨-y⟩ becomes ⟨-ies⟩ for plurals.
/ə/, /ɪ/	commA	a, e, i, o, u	afraid, defence, invisible, wonnton (Note: "wanton" in conventional spelling), opus	Schwa. The indeterminate sound in many unaccented syllables. TSR usually retains the graphemes used in TS for these phonemes.

=== Consonants ===
The following table lists the consonants that don't always represent the same phoneme, so /b/, /d/, /h/, /l/, /m/, /n/, /p/, /r/, /t/ and /v/ are omitted.

Phoneme	Grapheme	Examples	Notes
/dʒ/	j	jam	
/dʒ/	g	gin	Before /ɛ/, /ɪ/, /iː/, /aɪ/
/dʒ/	dg	edge	Doubled before /ɛ/, /ɪ/, /iː/, /aɪ/
/f/	f	frog	
/f/	ph	phone	In words of Greek origin only
/g/	g	gun	Except before /e/, /ɪ/, /iː/, /aɪ/ with no u (c.f. guide)
/j/	y	yet	
/j/	i	bastion	
/k/	k	kid	
/k/	c	cream	Except before /e/, /ɪ/, /iː/, /aɪ/
/k/	ck	flick, socker (Note: "soccer" in conventional spelling)	Word-finally or doubled
/k/	ch	chemistry	In words of Greek origin only
/ks/	x	exterminate	Treated as doubled (e.g. boxing)
/kw/	qu	queen	
/s/	s	sun	Word-initially, before or after /k/, /f/, /p/, /t/, as part of or after the prefixes ⟨dis-⟩, ⟨mis-⟩, ⟨con-⟩ and ⟨per-⟩ or beginning one part of a compound word (homesick)
/s/	ss	hiss	
/s/	c	city	Before /ɛ/, /ɪ/, /iː/, /aɪ/
/ʃ/	sh	shed	
/ʃ/	c	socially	Before ⟨ia⟩ in some dialects
/tʃ/	ch	church	
/tʃ/	-tch	switch	
/θ/	th	thing	
/ð/	th	bathe	In single syllable words before /ɛ/
/ð/	(o)th(er)	other	In ⟨-other⟩ subgroup
/ʒ/	s(ure)	plesure (Note: "pleasure" in conventional spelling)	As part of a common suffix
/ʒ/	si	lesion	

== Inconsistencies ==
=== "Ch" with /k/ sound ===
Words of Greek origin are supposed to retain "ch" for /k/, though these words are respelled in the word list:

- technique → tecnique
- technological → tecnolodgical

== Example text ==
Gettysburg Address

Fourscor and seven years ago our faathers brought forth, on this continent, a new nation, conceeved in libberty and deddicated to the proposition that all men are creäted equal. Now we are engaged in a grait civil war, testing whether that nation, or any nation so conceeved, and so deddicated, can long endure. We are met on a grait battle-feeld in that war. We have cum to deddicate a portion of that feeld, as a final resting place for those who here gave their lives, that that nation might liv. It is altogether fitting and propper that we should do this, but in a larger senss we cannot deddicate, we cannot consecrate, we cannot hallo this ground. The brave men, livving and ded, who struggled here, have consecrated it far abuv our poor power to add or detract. The world will little note, nor long remember, what we say here, but it can never forget what they did here. It is for us the livving, rather, to be deddicated to the grait task remaining befor us that from these onored ded we take increassed devotion to that cause for which they gave the last fuul mesure of devotion - that we here highly resolv that these ded shall not have died in vain, that this nation, under God, shall have a new birth of freedom, and that guvvernment of the peeple, by the peeple, for the peeple, shall not perrish from the erth.

== See also ==
- English Spelling Society
- List of reforms of the English language
- ENGLISH SPELLING SOCIETY Personal View 15 REGSPEL by Stephen Linstead (2014)
- English accents and their implications for spelling reform J.C. Wells, University College London 2022-08-16 accessed
