= John Downing (educational psychologist) =

British psychologist (1922–1987)

- Born: John Downing; 1922; England
- Died: June 2, 1987
- Occupations: Teacher and Educational psychologist
- Title: Professor
- Board member of: Director of the International Literacy Association and Founding President of the United Kingdom Literacy Association
- Spouse: Marianne Downing
- Children: Andrew Downing, Charles Downing and Rupert Downing
- Awards: International Literacy Association's International Citation of Merit (1984)

Academic background
- Education: BA Honours (with Distinction) & PhD in Psychology
- Alma mater: London University, Institute of Education

Academic work
- Discipline: Educational Psychology
- Sub-discipline: Reading
- Institutions: London University (Institute of Education) and University of Victoria
- Main interests: Initial Teaching Alphabet, Psychology of Reading, Comparative Reading
- Writing career
- Genre: Children's Basal Readers
- Notable works: Downing Readers, Young Set Dictionaries

John Downing (1922–1987) was a British educational psychologist who started his career as a teacher then worked as an academic from 1960 until his death in 1987. He published over 300 academic papers in his 27-year academic career, specialising in both how children read and how they learn to read. His three main fields of study were the initial teaching alphabet, the psychology of reading and the comparison of reading methods across different languages and cultures. His principle works in each of these fields were Evaluating the Initial Teaching Alphabet, Reading & Reasoning and Comparative Reading. Fundamentally, Downing was an educational psychologist and his main lifetime achievement was the formulation of the cognitive clarity theory of learning to read.

Downing won the award of Doctor of Literature by the University of London near the end of his career. He was elected a fellow of the British, Canadian and American Psychology Learned Societies & Associations and as a fellow to the Royal Society for Arts. In 1963, Downing was the founding president of the United Kingdom Literacy Association, he also served on the board of directors of the International Literacy Association, who awarded him with the International Citation of Merit and inducted him into their Hall of Fame. The government called on Downing to give evidence to both the Plowden and Bullock committees of inquiry.

== Personal life ==
Downing was born in England in 1922 and married Marianne Downing who often took on the role of his research assistant. They had three children together: Andrew Downing, Charles Downing and Rupert Downing. He emigrated from England to Canada in 1970 but spent several periods of time working in other parts of the world, especially the United States of America.

Downing was known for his trademark dress code in which he wore bold check jackets with bootlace badge ties, fashion characteristics which contrasted with his kind, quiet and scholarly manner. On initial introduction to new people, he had the uncanny ability to remember their names and where they both lived and worked. He was generous in providing assistance to his colleagues, altogether he was known as someone with a perpetually friendly manner.

After a 3-month struggle with cancer over the spring of 1987, Downing eventually succumbed to his illness and died on June 2, 1987, aged 65.

== Education ==
Downing continually improved his education throughout his life, while interspersing his learning with professional and academic work. He attained his teaching certificate in his twenties, his degree in his thirties, his PhD in his forties and was finally awarded the higher doctoral degree of D.Lit (Doctor of Literature) in his sixties as an acknowledgment of his academic successes by the University of London.

Period	Educational Institute	Qualification
1947–1948	Oakley College of Education (Note: Oakley Teacher Training College was set-up as an emergency training college for intending teachers on the redundant government buildings at Oakley Farm. The Training College for Men opened in June 1946, offering an intensive 48 week training course, the college closed in March 1951.), Cheltenham, England	Teacher's Certificate
1953–1957	University of London, England	BA in psychology (with distinction)
1966	University of London, England	PhD in Psychology
1982	University of London, England	D.Lit Doctor of Literature

== Classroom teaching ==
After starting his teacher training in 1947, Downing spent nearly a decade until 1957 acquiring practical experience in teaching children at elementary, secondary and special schools, in particular, he taught children to read and write from kindergarten age, Downing considered this experience essential in his later works and often stated how he was often baffled by children's difficulties in learning to read. Downing also studied for his degree in Psychology during the later period of his teaching career and only ended his teaching career after successfully completing his degree course.

== Professional vocation ==
After graduating Downing left teaching and worked as a communications research officer for Unilever in England between 1958 and 1960. This was a short interlude between his teaching and academic work.

== Academic career ==
In 1960, after his time at Unilever, Downing returned to the University of London and joined the Institute of Education where he took-up the newly formed role of director of the reading research unit. The reading research unit was created to run a trial of James Pitman's initial teaching alphabet, a novel approach to teaching children to read where an interim orthography, consisting of an alternative alphabet and regular spelling system were used instead of the irregular traditional English orthography. Downing spent seven years in the role, studying the initial teaching alphabet, he was to credit this key time as providing him with the crucial insights which inspired the majority of his later academic work. It was during this time that Downing attained his PhD and both began to be known as Dr. John Downing and became a senior lecturer of Educational Psychology.

In 1970, Downing took up the post of Professor of Psychological Foundations in Education at Victoria University, British Columbia, Canada, which he held until his death. It was during this time, following his emigration to Canada, that he produced some of his most significant academic works.

Three times during his career, Downing took up positions of some longevity as a visiting professor:-

- 1967–1968 – Visiting professor, University of California, Berkeley, where he taught the course on the psychology of reading and worked with masters and doctoral students researching this topic. Downing accredited this period of time as when the seeds of the cognitive clarity theory of learning to read were sown in his mind.
- 1981-1981 – Visiting professor, Ohio State University at Columbus
- 1986–1987 – Visiting professor, Universite de Toulouse-le-Mirail

In addition, Downing also served as a visiting professor for shorter durations in Australia, China, Finland and the Soviet Union. This was especially important later in his career for his study of comparative reading which also notably took him to Japan & Papua New Guinea as a researcher.

== Initial Teaching Alphabet ==
=== Reading research unit ===
As the director of the reading research unit, Downing spent seven years studying the initial teaching alphabet designed by James Pitman to teach children to read. He was amply supported by the fourteen colleagues in the reading research unit, in particular his deputy William Latham who was accredited in some of the academic publications. The unit was further supplemented by seven senior lecturers from educational colleges who served one-year secondments on a rotating basis. During his time at the reading research unit, Downing carried out two scientifically controlled, largescale trials of the initial teaching alphabet:

- 1961 - Twenty four local education authorities participated with 873 pupils being taught over 3 academic years using the i.t.a. compared with the same number of matched pupils who acted as the control.
- 1963 - Sixteen schools participated with 548 pupils being taught over 3 academic years using the i.t.a. compared with 554 pupils who acted as the control.

=== Academic works ===
Downing published a large body of academic work related to the initial teaching alphabet both whilst he was the director of the reading research unit and afterwards when he became a professor, this is comprehensively listed in his vitae, the more notable papers are listed below:

i.t.a. papers
Mth	Year	Article Title	Journal	Ref
Jan	1962	New experimental evidence on the role of the unsystematic spelling in reading failure	Educational Research	
Jun	1962	Relationship between reading attainment & inconsistency of English spelling	Educational Psychology	
Jan	1963	Is a 'mental age of six' essential for 'reading' readiness?	Educational Research	
Mar	1963	The augmented Roman alphabet for learning to read	The Reading Teacher	
Apr	1964	Teaching reading with i.t.a. in Britain	Phi Delta Kappan	
Nov	1964	The i.t.a. (initial teaching alphabet) reading experiment	The Reading Teacher	
May	1965	Current misconceptions about i.t.a.	Elementary English	
Jan	1966	Some problems of evaluating i.t.a. a second experiment	Educational Research	
Dec	1966	The i.t.a. - what next?	Paper to Reading Conference	
Jan	1967	How i.t.a. began	Elementary English	
Jan	1967	The effects of the i.t.a. on young children's written composition	Educational Research	
Jan	1967	The effects of the initial teaching alphabet on educationally subnormal pupils	The Slow Learning Child	
Feb	1967	What's wrong with i.t.a.?	Phi Delta Kappan	
Jun	1967	Will i.t.a. copyright prevent improvements? (a response from Downing)	Phi Delta Kappan	
Jul	1967	The i.t.a. - past and future	Paper to Reading Conference	
Oct	1967	Methodological problems in the British i.t.a. research	Reading Research Quarterly	
Dec	1967	Can i.t.a be improved?	Elementary English	
Mar	1968	Educational values and i.t.a.	Literacy	
Apr	1968	British i.t.a. research	The Reading Teacher	
Nov	1968	Alternative teaching methods in i.t.a	Elementary English	
Dec	1969	How children think about reading	The Reading Teacher	
Feb	1969	Initial teaching alphabet: results after six years	Literacy	
Jan	1969	i.t.a. and slow learners: a reappraisal	Educational Research	
Oct	1969	Comparison of failure in i.t.a. and T.O	The Reading Teacher	
Jan	1970	Cautionary comments on some American i.t.a. reports	Educational Research	
Nov	1970	A psycholinguistic theory for i.t.a.	Elementary English	
May	1971	Promising uses of the i..t.a. medium in Britain and Michigan	Michigan Reading Journal	
Mar	1971	i.t.a.: American versus British experience	Phi Delta Kappan	
Sep	1972	i.t.a.'s effectiveness in the prevention and treatment of disabilities in reading	Literacy Discussion	
Sep	1972	The orthography factor in literacy acquisition in different languages	Literacy Discussion	
Mar	1972	Slings and arrows	Literacy	
Apr	1972	A gap has two sides	The Reading Teacher	
Jan	1973	Could you teach i.t.a.?	Reading Improvement	
Jan	1973	Transfer of grapheme discrimination from cued to traditional orthography	Experimental Education	
May	1973	Some Reasons for NOT Using i.t.a.	Paper to Intl. Literacy Assn	
Jan	1976	The Bullock commission's judgment of i.t.a	The Reading Teacher	
May	1976	After 15 Years of i.t.a. in England – an official judgment	English in Australia	
Dec	1977	The probability of reading failure in i.t.a. and T.O	Literacy	
Jan	1978	Sensory handicaps and the initial teaching alphabet	The Exceptional Child	
Jan	1979	Results of teaching reading in i.t.a. to children with cognitive defects	Reading World	

In addition, Downing published five books on the initial teaching alphabet:

- 1962 – The Initial Teaching Alphabet – Explained and Illustrated
- 1965 – The Initial Teaching Alphabet Reading Experiment – Three Lectures on the Research in Beginning Reading with Sir James Pitman's Initial Teaching Alphabet
- 1966 – An Experimental Study of Orthography and Reading Attainments in English
- 1967 – The i.t.a. Symposium: Research Report on the British Experiment with i.t.a.
- 1967 – Evaluating the Initial Teaching Alphabet – A study of the influence of English orthography on learning to read and write, it was this book which was the final culmination of all his research efforts.

=== Children's literature ===
The initial teaching alphabet started being taught using existing basal reading schemes transliterated into i.t.a. but originally designed specifically around the nuances of traditional orthography, such as the Janet & John series of reading books. To remediate this, Downing wrote the Downing Readers which were designed specifically for the i.t.a. and these were all published in the 1960s, although eventually, there were several authors for the Downing readers, Downing was the accredited author of the following:

- Paul
- Sally
- Hello and goodbye
- The new horse
- Come here Jet
- Paul's bird table
- Zip and his car
- Going to school
- Get up Zip
- Up the tree
- Come and look
- The story of the ballet Coppelia
- Topsy-turvy world
- At the fire-station
- Fireworks
- The ice-cream cats
- Plum jam
- Peter's boat
- An adventure on ice
- Letter from Mike
- New school for Mike
- The secret
- The big surprise
- The lonely snowman
- Down to earth again
- Koalas and kangaroos
- Bandy's first jump
- Come and look
- The monster
- Present from granny
- Walk in the woods
- Where are Arthur and Helen
- Saved from the cliff
- Trapped in the well
- New born animals
- The i.t.a. alphabet book

=== Downing's conclusion ===
By the end of his study, Downing's principle conclusion on the initial teaching alphabet (i.t.a.) was:

i.t.a. as a transitional writing-system for beginning reading and writing in English generally produces superior results in traditional orthography reading and spelling by the end of third year of school

== Psychology of reading ==
After leaving his role as director of the reading research unit and taking up post as professor of psychological foundations in education at Victoria University, Downing built on his i.t.a. work by focusing on children's thought processes in learning to read, to this end he developed the cognitive clarity theory of learning to read, which was his crowning achievement as an educational psychologist. Much of Downing's later work was either the application of the theory or studies through the lens of the theory. As well as publishing a large number of academic papers, Downing's major academic works in this area of research were:

- 1971 - Reading Readiness, published originally by the University of London Press
- 1979 – Reading and Reasoning, published originally by Chambers and Springer-Verlag
- 1982 - Psychology of Reading, published originally by Macmillan
- 1983 – Linguistic Awareness in Reading Readiness (LARR) Test: Recognizing literacy behaviour, a test published originally by NFER-Nelson
- 1984 – Language Awareness and Learning to Read, published originally by Springer-Verlag

An interesting example of the application of the cognitive clarity theory of learning to read is the Young Set Dictionaries which Downing co-authored. The theory suggests that children have their own vocabulary of words which they desire to read and write rather than the vocabulary which adults desire to teach them. The mis-match often caused difficulties in learning to read, as such Downing co-compiled a multi-stage dictionary of words which children desired to be in their dictionaries:

1. Chambers Young Set Dictionary One (160 words for ages 4–5)
2. Chambers Young Set Dictionary Two (1,000 words for ages 6–7)
3. Chambers Young Set Dictionary Three (5,000 words for ages 8–9)
4. Chambers Young Set Dictionary Four (15,000 words for ages 10–11)

== Comparative reading ==
Downing's study of the initial teaching alphabet provided insight into how a language's linguistic characteristics and orthography could influence how children learn to read, as such he explored and compared learning to read in different languages and effectively launched a brand new field of study "comparative reading" named after his original academic work on this subject where he compared reading across 14 countries: Comparative Reading – Cross-national Studies of Behavior and Processes in Reading and Writing.

Downing described the three aims of this field of study:

1. Identify the universal psychological characteristics in the acquisition of reading skills across the world by taking into account the differences caused by languages, orthographies and school systems.
2. Catalogue, classify and assess how people read and learn to read in different languages and cultures.
3. Socialise out, the rich variety of successful teaching methods used by different societies which are often unknown outside of their own language.

As an example, one of Downing's early academic papers was on the use of Japanese Furigana as a teaching aid, this was published in the journal Forward Trends on 15 October 1971.

Downing continued to compare how reading was taught in different countries through the lens of his theory all the way to his death in 1987. One of his last researches was in Papua New Guinea which had over 800 spoken languages, so it was a natural laboratory for his final work. He titled his work Experiments in Linguistics and Literacy in Papua New Guinea (1986).

== Career highlights ==
The major academic highlights of John Downing's career were:

=== Notable speeches ===
Downing made eight keynote addresses to the bi-annual international congress on reading held by UNESCO and the International Reading Association, now known as the International Literacy Association:

- 1966 – 1st International Congress on Reading in Paris
- 1972 – 4th International Congress on Reading in Buenos Aires
- 1974 – 5th International Congress on Reading in Vienna
- 1976 – 6th International Congress on Reading in Singapore
- 1978 – 7th International Congress on Reading in Hamburg
- 1982 – 9th International Congress on Reading in Dublin
- 1984 – 10th International Congress on Reading in Hong Kong
- 1986 – 11th International Congress on Reading in London

=== United Kingdom and international reading associations ===
In 1963, Downing became the founding president of the United Kingdom Reading Association, now known as the United Kingdom Literacy Association.

He also held several prominent roles with its sister organisation, the International Literacy Association, who awarded him with the International Citation of Merit in 1984. Downing's roles for the International Literacy Association were:

- On the board of directors
- Chairman of the special interest group for international co-operation in research and development in reading
- Chairman of the special interest group for the language-experience approach
- Chairman of committee on voluntary service for literacy in third world countries
- Member of international development committee
- Member of the committee on comparative reading
- Member of several bi-annual congress programs:
  1. 1974–1976, Singapore world congress
  2. 1982–1984, French language reading
  3. 1982–1984, Multi-literacy in multi-cultural settings
  4. 1983–1984, German language reading
- In 1987, Downing was inducted onto the Reading Hall of Fame, an affiliated organisation of the International Literacy Association.

=== Government inquiries ===
==== 1967 – Plowden inquiry ====
As one of the leading experts on the initial teaching alphabet, Downing gave written and in-person evidence to the influential Plowden inquiry 'to consider primary education in all its aspects and the transition to secondary education'. Paragraph 588 of the report describes the committee's resulting thoughts on the subject of the initial teaching alphabet:

588. A hundred and fifty years ago, Coleridge, anxious about his own child's progress in reading, complained about 'our lying alphabet'. How great an obstacle is it to children who have difficulty in learning to read? The Initial Teaching Alphabet has attracted great public attention and has been the subject of heated argument. Should the claims made for the use of this alphabet be substantiated, it would mean that all but a small minority of those children who find reading difficult would find it so no longer. Since at present a substantial minority find difficulty, the claims merit careful scrutiny.

==== 1975 – Bullock inquiry ====
By 1975, Downing, as an expert in teaching children to read & write, gave evidence to the Bullock inquiry into the teaching in schools of reading and the other uses of English. There were two broad areas where Downing's expertise was sought:

- Firstly, the committee was concerned that the country may be falling behind others in levels of literacy, also the committee sought to identify good practices in other countries on difficult subjects such as the organisation of schooling. For both these reasons, Downing was consulted as an expert in the field of comparative reading between different countries.
- Secondly, the merits of the initial teaching alphabet were considered by the committee and Downing as the leading expert in the field, was consulted. The committee referred back to the evidence from the original largescale scientific studies carried out by Downing:

7.29 ... When groups of t.o. and i.t.a. children were matched in the main British experiments, the writing produced by the latter was of consistently higher quality. (Downing and Latham subsequently tested a sample of the children originally involved in this experiment and found that the i.t.a. pupils remained superior in t.o. reading and spelling even after five years at school, i.e. well beyond the transition stage).

=== Simplified Spelling Society ===
Downing replaced James Pitman, who was the founder of the initial teaching alphabet, as chairman of the simplified spelling society in 1972, a post he was to hold until his death. After his death, the society published the following obituary in its journal:

John Downing carried out the crucial scientific research which not merely demonstrated how and why the initial teaching alphabet was educationally so superior to traditional orthography, but also provided solid evidence to support the Society's message that the level of literacy would benefit from improvements in English spelling.

=== Awards and recognitions ===
Downing received recognition for his distinguished contributions in the field of educational psychology:

- 1973 - Elected as a Fellow of the British Psychological Society
- 1975 - Elected as a Fellow of the Royal Society of the Arts
- 1978 - Elected as a Fellow of the American Psychological Association
- 1981 - Elected as a Fellow of the Canadian Psychological Association
- 1987 - Elected as an Honorary Life Fellow of the Canadian Psychological Association
