= Jo Fletcher (academic) =

New Zealand professor of education

Academic background
- Education: University of Canterbury
- Thesis: The wider systemic conditions that support reading for 11 to 13 year-old students (2011)
- Doctoral advisor: Janinka Greenwood

Josephine Florence Fletcher is a New Zealand academic, and is a full professor in the School of Teacher Education at the University of Canterbury, specialising in literacy and learning environments.

== Academic career ==
Fletcher completed a PhD titled The wider systemic conditions that support reading for 11 to 13 year-old students at the University of Canterbury. Fletcher then joined the faculty of the University of Canterbury, rising to full professor in 2024. Fletcher supervised Canterbury's first Doctor of Education thesis.

Fletcher's research covers aspects of teaching and learning including literacy in Pasifika students, adult literacy, learning environments and distance learning, and the effects of the Christchurch earthquakes on learning. She has collaborated with Professor John Everatt on investigating innovative learning environments and Covid-19. Fletcher is a research advisor for the Better Start Literacy Approach research project at Canterbury, which is an evidence-based structured literacy approach developed for a New Zealand context, for Years 0 to 4. She is also part of a Ngā Pae o Te Māramatanga-funded project with Angus MacFarlane, looking at 'practices of sustenance' for Māori learners. With Niki Davis, she led a Ministry of Education project on e-learning for adult literacy and numeracy, which led to further work on how e-learning could support English literacy for people learning it as a second language.

Fletcher is a member of the advisory board of the Teaching and Learning Research Initiative, which is a government fund established in 2003 to fund research on teaching learning from primary through to tertiary and build research capacity and capability.

== Selected works ==
- Fletcher, Josephine Florence; Faye Parkhill; Amosa Fa'afoi; Leali'ie'e Tufulasi Taleni; Bridget O'Regan (2009). "Pasifika students: teachers and parents voice their perceptions of what provides supports and barriers to Pasifika students' achievement in literacy and learning". Teaching and Teacher Education. 25 (1): 24–33. doi:10.1016/j.tate.2008.06.002. Wikidata Q126950165.
- Fletcher, Josephine Florence; Nicholas, Karen (2015). "What can school principals do to support students and their learning during and after natural disasters?". Educational Review. 68 (3): 358–374. doi:10.1080/00131911.2015.1114467. Wikidata Q125024580.
- Fletcher, Josephine Florence; Grimley, Michael; Janinka Greenwood; Faye Parkhill (2012). "Motivating and improving attitudes to reading in the final years of primary schooling in five New Zealand schools". Literacy. 46 (1): 3–16. doi:10.1111/j.1741-4369.2011.00589.x. Wikidata Q58204935.
- Fletcher, Josephine Florence; Janinka Greenwood; Faye Parkhill (2010). "Are schools meeting their clients' expectations? Parents voice their perceptions about children learning to read in schools today". Teaching and Teacher Education. 26 (3): 438–446. doi:10.1016/j.tate.2009.05.011. Wikidata Q124175778.
- MacKey, Julia; N. O’Reilly; C. Jansen; Fletcher, Josephine Florence (2017). "Leading change to co-teaching in primary schools: a "Down Under" experience". Educational Review. 70 (4): 465–485. doi:10.1080/00131911.2017.1345859. Wikidata Q126950173.
- Fletcher, Josephine Florence; John Everatt (2021). "Innovative learning environments in New Zealand: Student teachers' perceptions". New Zealand Journal of Educational Studies. 56 (S1): 81–101. doi:10.1007/s40841-021-00195-3. PMC 7962423. PMID 40477869. Wikidata Q126950161.
- Fletcher, Josephine Florence; Faye Parkhill; Amosa Fa’afoi; Morton, Missy (2006). "Poto He Anga: Collaboration and Consultation in Pasifika Research". Qualitative Research Journal. 6 (1): 36–50. doi:10.1108/14439883200600003. Wikidata Q125142342.
