= Inventive spelling =

Use of unconventional spellings of words

Inventive spelling (sometimes invented spelling) is the use of unconventional spellings of words.

Conventional written English is not phonetic. Due to the history of English spelling conventions, the spelling of a particular word may not always reflect its pronunciation. This results in seemingly unintuitive, misleading or arbitrary spelling conventions for individual words, unlike in languages such as German or Spanish, in which letters have relatively fixed associated sounds such that written text is a consistent representation of speech.

== Overview ==
English spelling is not intuitive and must be learned. There have been numerous proposals to rationalize written English, notably by

- Noah Webster in the early 19th century (which is why the Webster's Dictionary used in the US varies from the British Oxford English Dictionary)
- Sir Isaac Pitman, inventor of Pitman shorthand about 1838, which uses symbols to represent sounds, and words are, for the most part, written as they are spoken
- Dr. John R. Malone invented Unifon in the mid-1950s
- Sir James Pitman (the grandson of Sir Isaac) in the early 1960s developed the Initial Teaching Alphabet
- Jaber Jabbour in 2012 proposed SaypU, an abbreviated version of the International Phonetic Alphabet adapted for tourism and safety notices, which uses only part of the Latin alphabet

== In education ==
Inventive spelling for children may be encouraged or discouraged by teachers and parents who may believe that expression is more important than accurate orthography or conversely that a failure to correct may lead to difficulty in communicating more complex ideas in later life.

Inventive spelling programs may also be known as "words their way" in some schools' curricula. Critics of inventive spelling have argued that inventive spelling does not produce superior writing skills.

=== Debate ===
Samuel Orton pioneered the study of learning disabilities, such as dyslexia. where the subject is apt to confound the letter-order of words. He and his assistant Anna Gillingham, an educator and psychologist, evolved the Orton-Gillingham Approach to reading instruction which is language-based, multi-sensory, structured, sequential, cumulative, cognitive, and flexible. The Academy of Orton-Gillingham Practitioners and Educators (AOEPE) lists about a dozen schools currently committed to this controversial method, which has evolved since about 1935.

More recently, Uta Frith, a developmental psychologist at the Institute of Cognitive Neuroscience at University College, London, has published work concerning spelling difficulties and dyslexia.

Dyslexia, whether linked to complex spelling or not, may offer considerable potential for human development.

=== Learning theory ===
An individual's stance on inventive spelling is a feature of their theory of learning. The debate is closely linked with the debate over whole language literacy instruction and phonics instruction.

Advocates of inventive spelling focus on creativity when children are first learning to spell and write, arguing that it preserves self-esteem, thus giving it importance. Opponents counter that creativity distracts children from learning spelling for the first time, and that children ought to be taught accurate spelling as soon as possible so they do not develop a habit of spelling words incorrectly. The overwhelming view from parents is that children learn to spell more quickly and accurately if accurate spelling is the focus instead of creativity when learning words. Focusing on the accuracy of spelling is the manner used in conventional teaching methods and was effectively universal prior to the implementation of 1970s school reform involving whole word literacy and "new math".

=== Instruction ===
Pedagogical concepts are based on research studies of early literacy, such as by Emilia Ferreiro, Ana Teberosky, Maryann Manning and others. Children are encouraged to learn to read by writing in a meaningful context, such as by writing letters to others. To write a word, they have to decompose its spoken form into sounds and translate them into letters, such as k, a, and t for the phonemes /k/, /æ/, and /t/ respectively. Empirical studies indicate that, as long as children are initially confronted with "book spellings", later orthographic development may be fostered rather than hindered by invented spellings.

The usage of SIL International's inventive spelling program involved several instructional principles; Teachers were to accept all of the student's writing as meaningful writing. As students gain more experience, they begin to learn how to spell words correctly and incorporate that into their writing. Students were to be allowed to write freely and independently, then be instructed to read what they have written, which would then be read or repeated by the teachers, who were to avoid correcting any spelling or grammatical errors unless students ask them to do so, and to help students create their own word lists so they can learn the proper spelling of words.

One aspect of inventive spelling rarely discussed by its advocates is the toll it takes on teachers' time. Recent studies suggest that, in order to be effective, a spelling teacher must also correctly guess what words children mean to use when they invent spellings. The possible deductions are numerous and potentially complicated.

==== For conventional spelling ====
Writing and reading are complex cognitive processes of encoding and decoding symbols, of which spelling is only a part. "Look and say" forms an image of a word without spelling. Spelling training may require children to write out lists of words repeatedly, or engage in competitive spelling bee tests. Such methods of instruction do not tend to improve students' understanding of the relationship between spelling and pronunciation on any words except those prescribed.

Instruction that emphasizes conventional spelling focuses on the phonetic patterns and rules in English which are intrinsically weak because of the complexity of the history of the English language. For example, children can be taught that, when they hear the /k/ sound at the end of a one-syllable word where a short vowel precedes the sound, the /k/ sound will be spelled ck (as in stack, wreck, stick, rock, and stuck). A similar pattern holds for the /dʒ/ sound spelled dge (as in badge, wedge, bridge, lodge, and budge) and the /tʃ/ sound spelling tch.

The same is also applicable for the process of learning acronyms. It is acceptable to use the inventive spelling of GBOL or Jeebol which can in turn be written as Jeeball.

Once children learn these phonics patterns, they can apply them to words. When children make errors, the teacher does not merely tell them they are wrong; the teacher, to the extent possible, returns the child's attention to the relevant rule or pattern.

There are also sight words that do not follow patterns; children need to memorize conventional spellings for these words, such as who.

== Benefits and shortcomings ==
=== Benefits ===
Children's invented spellings may help teachers understand what students know and do not know about the phonetic structure of the language. Sophisticated spelling, even if it is not conventional, may indicate strong phonological awareness. Examining invented spellings may help researchers understand the development of phonological awareness and understanding of sound-symbol correspondences.

For teachers who emphasize constructivist, inventive spellings, there are further advantages; children who are allowed to spell inventively may learn an earlier appreciation for writing and may be more creative in their writing because they focus less on form. They may also use more complicated and precise words that occur in their oral vocabulary, but that they do not yet know how to spell, improving their ability to express their ideas.

The above two suppositions on the benefits of inventive spelling have not been empirically verified and are not generally accepted by neurolinguists, who study the natural learning process of spoken language and have recently determined that reading and spelling are not "hard-wired", natural processes.

=== Shortcomings ===
According to some research, children may learn to spell correctly faster if they are taught to do so in a direct and systematic way. Encouraging inventive spelling may delay children's conventional spelling development. Early excitement about writing may give way to later frustration when students feel a lack of confidence about their misspellings. Some students like to spell things correctly and may resist attempts to get them to spell inventively. Practising bad spelling habits ingrains such habits and makes them difficult to overcome, while spelling correctly from the beginning eliminates this problem.
