= Janinka Greenwood =

Czech–New Zealand educator, playwright, poet

- Born: Janinka Miroslava Alzbeta Chuml; 20 October 1947 (age 78); Prague, Czechoslovakia
- Citizenship: New Zealander

Academic background
- Education: Griffith University
- Thesis: Journeys into A Third Space: A study of how theatre enables us to interpret the emergent space between cultures (1999)
- Doctoral advisor: John O'Toole

Academic work
- Institutions: University of Canterbury
- Doctoral students: Jo Fletcher

Janinka Greenwood (née Janinka Miroslava Alzbeta Chuml; born 20 October 1947) is a New Zealand academic, playwright and poet. Since 2018, she has been professor emerita in the School of Teacher Education at the University of Canterbury.

== Early life ==
Greenwood was born Janinka Miroslava Alzbeta Chuml in Prague, Czechoslovakia, on 20 October 1947. Her family migrated to New Zealand and she became a naturalised New Zealander in 1960. She was educated at Baradene College of the Sacred Heart in Auckland. When she was in the sixth form, aged 16, she won the Theatre Arts Guild national essay competition, organised by the Christchurch Shakespeare Festival committee, on the topic "Shakespeare after four centuries".

== Academic career ==
Greenwood completed a PhD titled Journeys into A Third Space: A study of how theatre enables us to interpret the emergent space between cultures at Griffith University. Greenwood then joined the faculty of the University of Canterbury, rising to full professor. She is director of the Research Lab for Creativity and Change. She was appointed professor emerita in 2018.

Greenwood taught drama in primary, secondary and tertiary education settings for twenty years. Greenwood is known internationally for her research into the use of drama and theatre in education. She has written a number of resources for teachers, and was involved with the Te Mauri Pakeaka project. This project, created by Arnold Wilson, ran from the late 1970s until 1988, and was an educational programme aimed at making a 'third space' for Māori and Pākehā cultures to come together in the creation of art.

Greenwood was publications officer for the New Zealand Association for Drama in Education. She is also a playwright and poet. She has collaborated internationally with researchers in Bangladesh, Norway, Canada, Czech Republic, Germany, Thailand, and Malaysia.

In 2020, Greenwood was a keynote speaker at the International Society for Education through Art conference, where she talked about the responses of arts communities to lockdowns and social division. In 2022 Greenwood was the co-organiser of an art auction in Northland to raise money for artists in Ukraine.

One of Greenwood's notable doctoral students is Professor Jo Fletcher, in the School of Teacher Education at the University of Canterbury.

== Awards and honours ==
The American Alliance for Theater and Education awarded Greenwood their Distinguished Dissertation Award in 2004.

== Selected works ==
=== Plays ===
- Broadway story
- The Paperbag Princess
- Raupahapeha - Hill of Shame?
- Shylock
- Write my script

=== Journal papers ===
- Fletcher, Josephine Florence; Janinka Greenwood; Grimley, Michael; Faye Parkhill (2011). "Raising literacy achievement in reading: how principals of 10‐ to 12‐year‐old students are making this happen". International Journal of Leadership in Education. 14 (1): 61–83. doi:10.1080/13603124.2010.496873. Wikidata Q58204953.
- Fletcher, Josephine Florence; Grimley, Michael; Janinka Greenwood; Faye Parkhill (2012). "Motivating and improving attitudes to reading in the final years of primary schooling in five New Zealand schools". Literacy. 46 (1): 3–16. doi:10.1111/j.1741-4369.2011.00589.x. Wikidata Q58204935.
- Karna Rana; Janinka Greenwood; Wendy Fox-Turnbull; Stuart Wise (2019). "Challenges in accessing fieldwork in rural Himalayas: An emerging researcher's experiences". Waikato Journal of Education. 24 (1): 67–77. doi:10.15663/wje.v24i1.605. Wikidata Q124175343.
- Karna Rana; Janinka Greenwood; Wendy Fox‐Turnbull (2019). "Implementation of Nepal's education policy in ICT: Examining current practice through an ecological model". The Electronic Journal of Information Systems in Developing Countries. 86 (2). doi:10.1002/isd2.12118. Wikidata Q124175340.
- Janinka Greenwood (2018). "Operational trust: Reflection from navigating control and trust in a cross-cultural professional development project". Educational Philosophy and Theory. 51 (1): 107–116. doi:10.1080/00131857.2018.1449640. Wikidata Q124175342.
- Joanna Lim; Fickel, Letitia; janinka greenwood (2019). "Mapping the landscape of professional inquiry as a form of teacher learning in New Zealand: a narrative inquiry into one teacher's experience". Journal of In-Service Education. 48 (1): 120–133. doi:10.1080/19415257.2019.1689526. Wikidata Q124175300.
- Janinka Greenwood; Robin Pascoe (2018). "Spaces we share". NJ Drama Australia Journal. 42 (2): 102–117. doi:10.1080/14452294.2019.1588378. Wikidata Q124175299.
