= Cognitive clarity theory of learning to read =

Educational theory

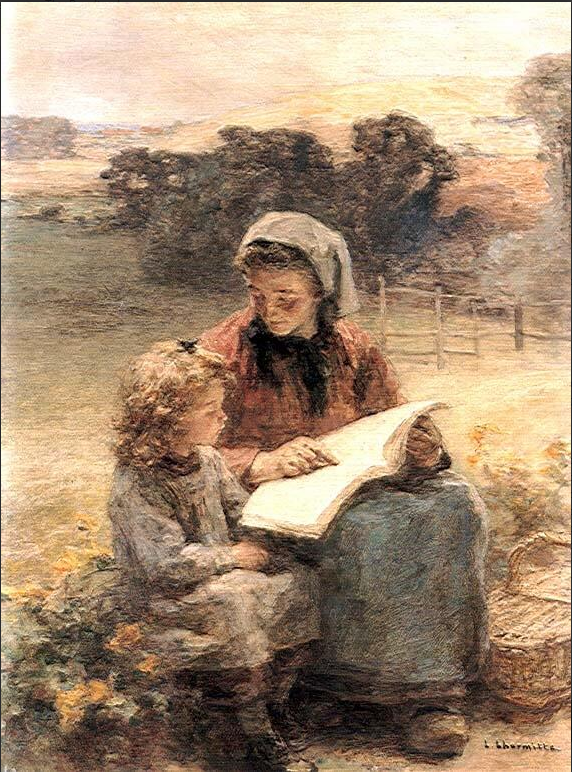
The Reading Lesson, an oil painting by Leon Augustin Lhermitte (1844–1925)

Professor John Downing, an educational psychologist, proposed the cognitive clarity theory of learning to read in a paper which he presented to the annual meeting of the United Kingdom Literacy Association between the 23 and 28 July 1971.

The theory rejected the common-place notions of the time that learning to read utilised some special or unique traits from human evolution. Instead Downing conjectured the process of learning to read purely used general intellectual abilities, so an understanding of cognition can be used to explain how children learn to read. In the theory, Downing included a model of the cognitive processes for a child attempting to attain literacy, which showed how reading success or failure depended on variables such as the child's spoken language, the written language being learnt and the teaching culture in which the child learnt to read.

Downing would publish a multitude of academic papers and other works in which he explored his theory and its applications, Downing demonstrated how the theory could be applied to improve the outcomes from the process of learning to read, particularly in the area of reading readiness where he developed a test to measure how ready a child was to start learning to read.

== Background ==
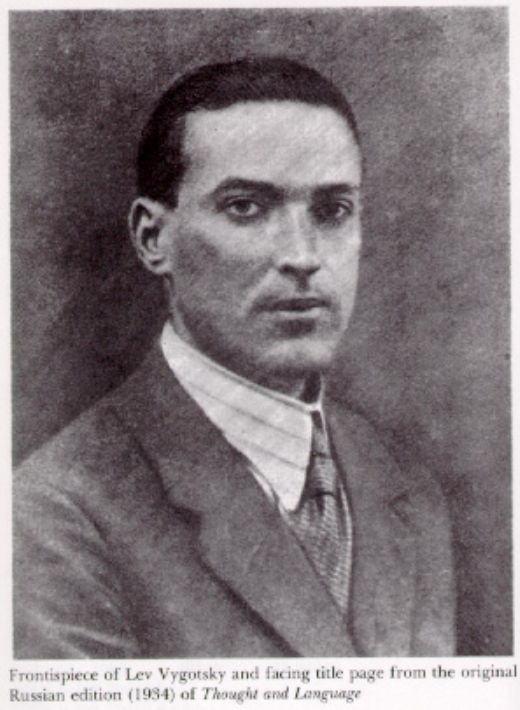
Lev Vygotsky shown in his seminal work, Thought & Language (originally published in the Soviet Union 1934)

Between 1960 and 1969, Downing was the director of the Reading Research Unit within the Institute of Education at the University of London, where he spent nearly a decade studying children learning to read using the initial teaching alphabet and equally control groups of children who did not use the initial teaching alphabet. This unusual experiment of using a different orthography provided Downing with the inspiration to formulate his theory. Downing later accredited his time as visiting professor (1967–68) to the University of California, Berkeley, as when those previous insights were crystallised into an outline of a theory.

As well as using his own work, Downing developed his theory on the foundations of previously published research, most notably: -

- 1926 - Jean Piaget's study "The Language and Thought of the Child"
- 1957 - Magdalen Dorothea Vernon's study "Backwardness in reading; a study of its nature and origins"
- 1962 - Lev Vygotsky's study "Thought and Language"
- 1966 - J.F. Reid's experiment published in a paper "Learning to think about reading". Downing both repeated Reid's experiment and expanded upon it for this theory.

In order to test the theory, there was a need to compare different ways in which children learn't to read. The theory postulated that the degree of success in learning to read was dependent on factors such as: - language, dialects, orthographies, teaching cultures etc. As such it was necessary to compare the way children read across different countries so Downing promoted a field of study which became known as "Comparative Reading" and published a book of the same name in 1973.

== The Theory ==
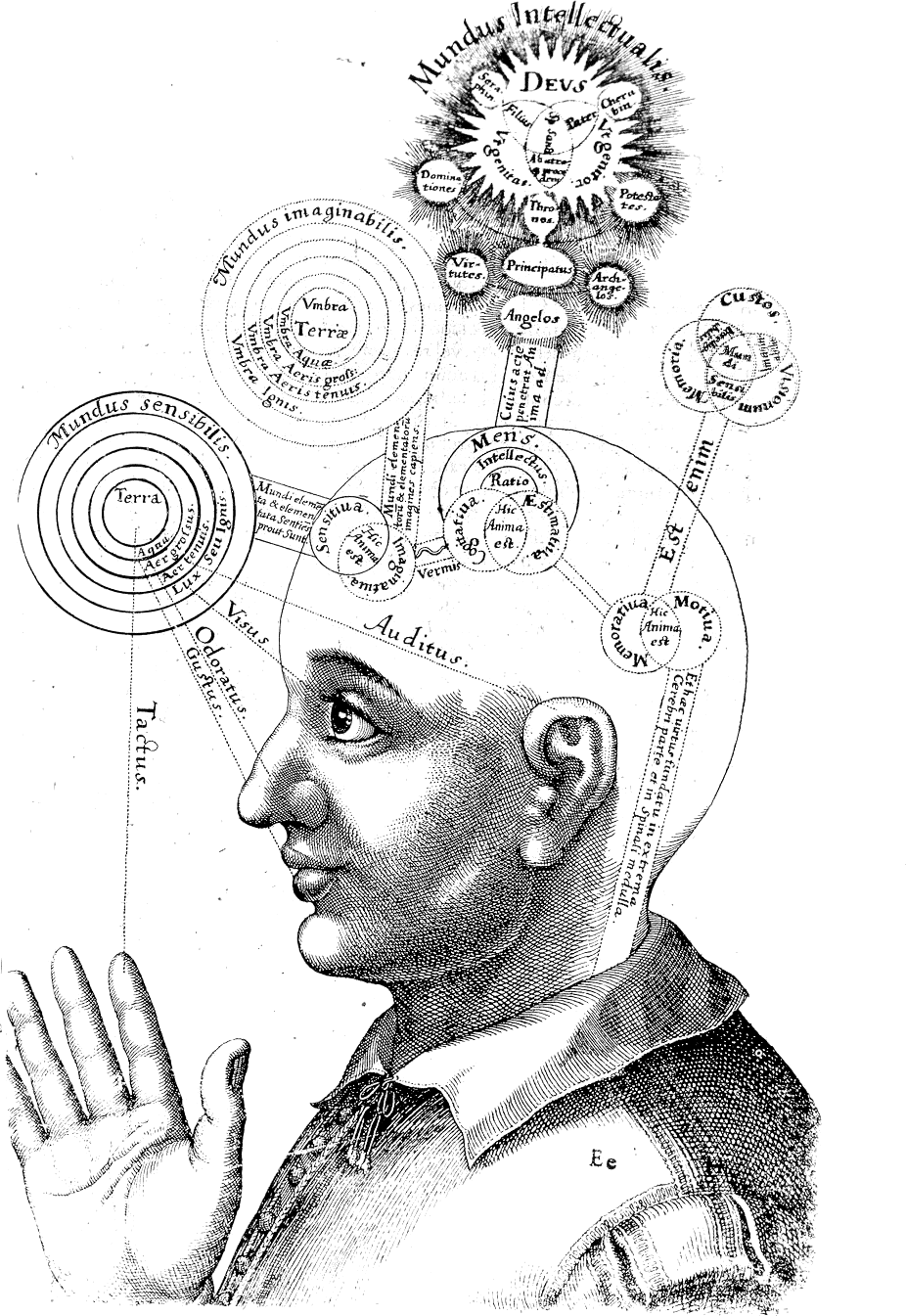
A cognitive model, as illustrated by Robert Fludd (1619)

1. Cognition - Downing rejected any notions that written language utilised any special characteristics from human evolution. He argued that the relatively small number of human ancestors who had previously learnt to read and the short period of evolutionary time, during which humans had read, meant that reading simply used general intellectual abilities so an understanding of cognition can be used to explain how children learn to read. Furthermore, Downing rejected much of the previous research into reading which he judged as being overconcerned with the external aspects of reading:- perception, eye-movements, visual discrimination, letter-name knowledge, etc., at the cost of neglecting the conceptual and reasoning processes behind these surface features.
2. Imitation - Children initially learn by observing and imitating others so for instance a young child without explicit instruction, can learn to guide a spoon to the mouth. Downing noted that this is not possible with reading as it is a mental activity hence children are unable to use their general observational technique to copy the mental processes adults use to read.
3. Abstract thought - For the first time in their lives, children need to learn a complex & abstract way of thinking where they memorise symbols and associate those symbols to sounds which they blend into words which they translate into meaning. Unfortunately, children have no idea of this very nature of reading so they are in a cognitive state of confusion. This is exacerbated by fact that children initially have little or no idea of the actual purpose of reading, this is especially the case for children who have not been exposed to story-telling from books prior to attending school.
4. Manifestation - As children learn to read, most children progressively develop a cognitive state of clarity as they work out both the purpose of reading and an understanding of its very nature, including concepts such as words, pages, letters, sounds etc. A manifestation of their newly found cognitive clarity is the ability to explain these literary concepts.
5. Continuation - The initial stage of learning to read is critical but cognitive clarity continues to improve through later stages of education as they learn more advanced concepts such as grammar.

== The Model ==
Cognitive Clarity Model of Learning to Read

[1.1] Spoken Language	[1.2] Written Language
[1.0] Linguistic Stimuli

[2.1] Schooling	[2.2] Child's State of Mind	[3.1] Orthography
[2.0] Extraneous Stimuli	[3.0] Literate Expectations
[0.0] Cognitive Processes

[3.2] Teacher's Language

In Downing's model, the result of the [0.0] - Cognitive Processes of the child learning to read would fall into a spectrum of outcomes between either the child attaining cognitive clarity and becoming a fluent reader, or staying in a state of cognitive confusion and failing to learn to read. There were several factors which influenced these cognitive processes: -

[1.0] Linguistic Stimuli

- [1.1] Spoken Language: - the level of speech development previously attained by the child and the language(s) and dialect(s) learn't.

- [1.2] Written Language: - any previous knowledge of the nature of written language and its purposes

[2.0] Extraneous Stimuli

- [2.1] Schooling: - the level of experience of the teachers, support from parents, the teaching methods & reading materials used

- [2.2] State of Mind: - the emotional state of the child from their home life

[3.0] Literate Expectations

- [3.1] Orthography: - the regularity, simplicity and consistency of the orthography being learn't.

- [3.2] Teacher's Language - both their written and spoken language including dialects and the standard (received) pronunciation of the written language.

[0.0] Cognitive Processes

Downing also detailed the cognitive processes experienced by a child in their journey to cognitive clarity: -

1. Understanding the communication purpose of written language,
2. Conceptualizing the symbolic function of writing,
3. Understanding the concepts of decoding and encoding,
4. Learning linguistic concepts,
5. Developing the corresponding technical terminology for such abstract units of language.

== The Evidence ==
The model explained some key observations

=== Written Language ===
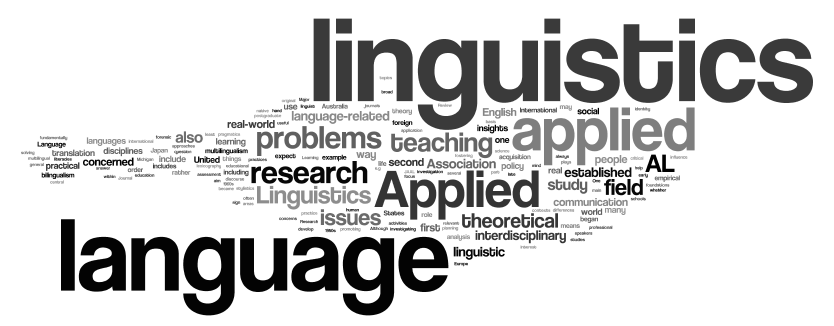
Wordle Illustration by Benjamin Stewart (2013)

Downing's other research into the initial teaching alphabet showed how the regularity of the orthography being used can improve literacy outcomes. To this end, his model explained how children who start learning using the initial teaching alphabet often became better readers in English traditional orthography (t.o.) in comparison to those who were taught solely in t.o.:-

1. The regularity of the initial teaching alphabet as an orthography resulted in improved cognitive clarity relative to learning in irregular t.o.
2. When the child then transitioned to learning t.o., they already had a good grasp of the nature of written language so also quickly attained cognitive clarity in reading t.o.

The same argument was used to explain how some dual-language children such as Latin-American children could learn to read English easier than single language English speakers. The children would learn to read in the orthographically regular Spanish written language using their Spanish mother tongue, hence gaining cognitive clarity over the reading process. When the children transitioned to learning to read English in their second language, they then took an understanding the concepts of written language into the learning process hence learning to read quickly.

=== Spoken Language ===
The model also explained some patterns of reading failure observed which were associated with a child's spoken language: -

1. A child's mother tongue is different to the written language being learn't.
2. A child's dialect is different to the teacher's dialect or the standard (received) pronunciation of the written language being learn't.
3. Confusion from differences between highly structured written language in comparison to the child's spoken language which uses techniques such as intonation, stress and rhythm.

The model indicates that the above reading problems occurred because of a mis-match between a child's spoken language and the literate expectations.

=== Cognitive Clarity ===
==== Alphabetic letter naming ====
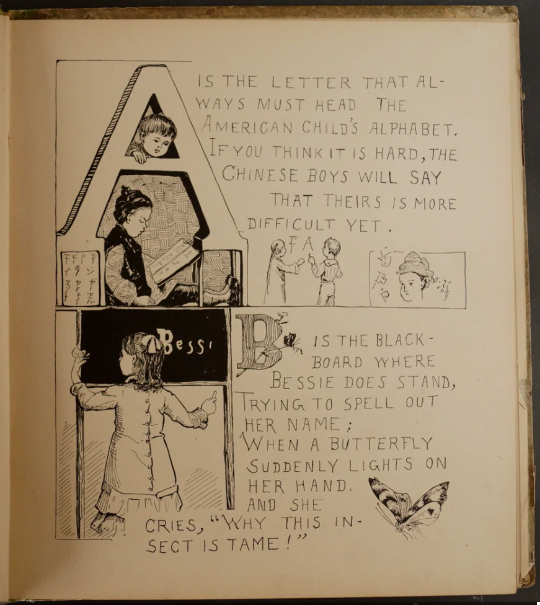
Page from the Alphabet Children's Book (1884), teaching children the names of the letters through poems

Downing used his model to explain the anomaly of why children who began to read successfully tended to know the names of letters of the alphabet, yet experimental teaching of letter-names led to no discernible improvement in reading. Downing argued that being able to name the letters was a manifestation of attaining cognitive clarity, simply teaching children to mimic this symptom does not help the children attain cognitive clarity.

==== Discerning letters ====
Downing used his model to explain the anomaly of why children with a reading disability often had a better analytic ability to differentiate graphic symbols from one another relative to children with no reading problems. Downing argued that these children had the ability to discriminate between letters but lacked the cognitive ability to logically categorise written symbols into the conceptual writing-system they represent.

==== Reading lags speech ====
In 1962, Lev Vygotsky investigated the lag between the schoolchild's oral and written language and concluded that it is the abstract quality of written language that is the main stumbling block, extenuated by the lack of motivation to learn such a complex process since a child only has a vague notion of its usefulness. Downing used this core idea as a basis of his theory.

== Publications ==
=== Papers ===
Downing published his theory cognitive clarity theory of learning to read in a paper which he presented to the annual meeting of the United Kingdom Reading Association between the 23rd and 28 July 1971.

Prior to this, Downing had published several key papers which laid the foundations for his theory: -

1970 - Children's concepts of language in learning to read.

1970 - The development of linguistic concepts in children's thinking.

1970 - A psycholinguistic theory of i.t.a.

1971 - How children develop concepts of language.

Additionally, Downing published an extensive set of papers on the initial teaching alphabet, which sowed the seeds of his theory.

=== Books ===
Downing explored his theory in several publications: -

1979 - Reading and Reasoning, a book published by Chambers in Edinburgh and Springer-Verlag in New York

1984 - Language Awareness and Learning to Read, a book published by Springer-Verlag in New York

=== Tests ===
Downing also applied his theory to develop a test designed to evaluate the reading readiness of children: -

1983 - Linguistic Awareness in Reading Readiness (LARR) Test: Recognizing literacy behaviour, a test published by NFER-Nelson in the U.K.
