= Culkin =

Culkin is an Irish surname. Notable people with the surname include:

- Courtney Rachel Culkin (born 1983), American model
- Francis D. Culkin (1874–1943), American politician from New York
- John M. Culkin (1928–1993), media scholar and critic
- Kieran Culkin (born 1982), American actor
- Kit Culkin (born 1944), American broadway actor and father of Macaulay, Kieran and Rory
- Macaulay Culkin (born 1980), American actor
- Margaret Culkin Banning (1891–1982), author of thirty-six novels and early advocate of women's rights
- Michael Culkin (born 1954), British actor
- Nick Culkin (born 1978), English football player
- Rory Culkin (born 1989), American actor
- Sean Culkin (born 1993), American football player
