= Initial sound table =

Table showing pictures with corresponding sounds

An initial sound table (German: Anlauttabel) is a table, list or chart which shows a letter together with a picture of the things whose word start with that letter. They are commonly used in German classrooms for language teaching. The first initial sound table was created in 1658 by John Amos Comenius in Orbis Pictus, a picture book intended for children. They were popularized in the German-speaking areas by Jürgen Reichen who used initial sound tables to assist students to recognise initial sounds and to get first reading and writing skills.

Alternative names: initial sound list, initial sound chart, initial sound alphabet, alphabet chart, alphabet picture chart

== Writing to read ==
In the German-speaking countries, language experience is often based on children's writing of stories that involves invented spellings (e.g. with the help of an "initial sound table" picturing words that start with a specific sound). The Swiss teacher Jürgen Reichen (progressive education) founded this "writing to read" method 1982. The method combines two basic features of in favour of "phonics" (unduly equated with "direct instruction", stepwise teaching, etc.). According to this approach children should be encouraged to "write words as they pronounce them" with the help of an "initial sound list" of pictured words. Constructing words in this way is supposed to help them to understand the basic relationship between spoken and written language.

Johann Amos Comenius already added 1658 an initial-sound-table to his „Orbis sensualium pictus“.

Orbis pictus: Alphabet (A to M)	Orbis pictus: Alphabet (N to Z)
Orbis pictus: Alphabet (A to M)	Orbis pictus: Alphabet (N to Z)

== Initial sound keyboard ==
There are software for children which has a multimedial initial sound keyboard for text input (virtual keyboard). Several hardware keyboards for kids also have initial sound pictures on its keys. With initial sound stickers and a standard computer keyboard you can create your own initial sound keyboard.app0l

== Initial sound examples ==
There are initial sounds, medial sounds and final sounds.

Initial sounds	Initial sounds and initial sound pictures used in initial sound tables
A	alligator, anaconda, ant, apple, axe
B	bag, ball, banana, beater, bee, bed, bike, bird, boat, bud, bun, bus, butterfly
C	camera, can, cap, carrot, cat, cloud, cob, cog, corn, cot, cup
D	daisy, dart, deer, desk, dinosaur, dog, doll, donut, door, dragon, duck
E	eagle, earth, egg, elbow, elephant
F	fan, feather, fig, fin, fish, foot, fork, fox
G	garage, gas, gears, goat, gorilla, guitar, gum
H	ham, hammer, hand, hat, helicopter, hem, hen, hip, hoe, hog, house
I	igloo, Indian, iguana, insect, invitation impala,
J	jacks, jam, jeans, jeep, jet, jug, juggle, jump
K	kangaroo, keg, key, kid, king, kitchen, kite, kiwi, knight, koala
L	ladder, leg, lemon, lid, light, lion, lips, lobster, log
M	mad, map, mail, maracas, men, moose, moon, mop, mouse, mud
N	nose, net, nail, needle, nest, newspaper, nine, nose, numbers, nut
O	officer, orange, owl
P	pan, peg, pen, pig, pin, pineapple, pod, post, pup
Q	quail, quarter, queen, quilt
R	rabbit, radio, rag, rainbow, rake, rat, red, rib, rocket, rod, rose, rug
S	sailboat, saw, sod, sea, seal, seven, six, star, submarine, sun
T	tag, tambourine, tan, telephone, ten, tent, tiger, tin, tomato, top, tower, train, tub
U	unicorn, uniform,
V	vase, video, violin, volcano, valentine
W	wagon, water, web, wig, windmill
X	Xmas, xylograph, xylophone
Y	yak, yarn, yoyo, yam
Z	zebra, zebra, zero, zipper, zither

Initial sounds	Initial sounds and initial sound pictures used in initial sound tables
BL	black, blend, block, blond, bluff
BR	brad, bran, brig, brim, brush
CL	clap, clam, cliff, clock, clubs
CR	crab, crack, crash, crest, cross
DR	dress, drop, drill, drink, drums
FL	flab, flag, flat, floss, flush
FR	frills, frock, frog, frost, froth
GL	glad, glass, glen, gloss, glum
GR	grab, grand, grass, grill, grin
PL	plans, plant, plug, plums, plus
PR	pram, press, primps, print, prop
SC	scab, scald, scallop, scalp, scallop
SH	shell, ship, shirt, shoe, shop, shovel
SK	skip, skull, skip, skin, skill
SL	slam, slosh, slot, slug, slush
SM	smog, smash, small, smell, smug
SN	snack, snap, snag, snip, sniffs
SP	spill, spin, spell, spend, spot
ST	stop, stump, stand, stamp, stuck
SW	swift, swig, swim, swan, swamp
TR	trick, trim, trunk, tram, track
TW	twins, twig, twist, twill, twang

== See also ==
- Language education
- Phonics, Phonetics
- Phonemic awareness
- Initial Teaching Alphabet
- Literacy
- Gio-Key-Board (free word processor with initial sound keyboard)

== Bibliography ==
- Günther Thomé, Dorothea Thomé (2016): Deutsche Wörter nach Laut- und Schrifteinheiten gegliedert, Oldenburg: isb-Verlag.
