= Honor Salmon =

British first officer pilot (1912–1943)

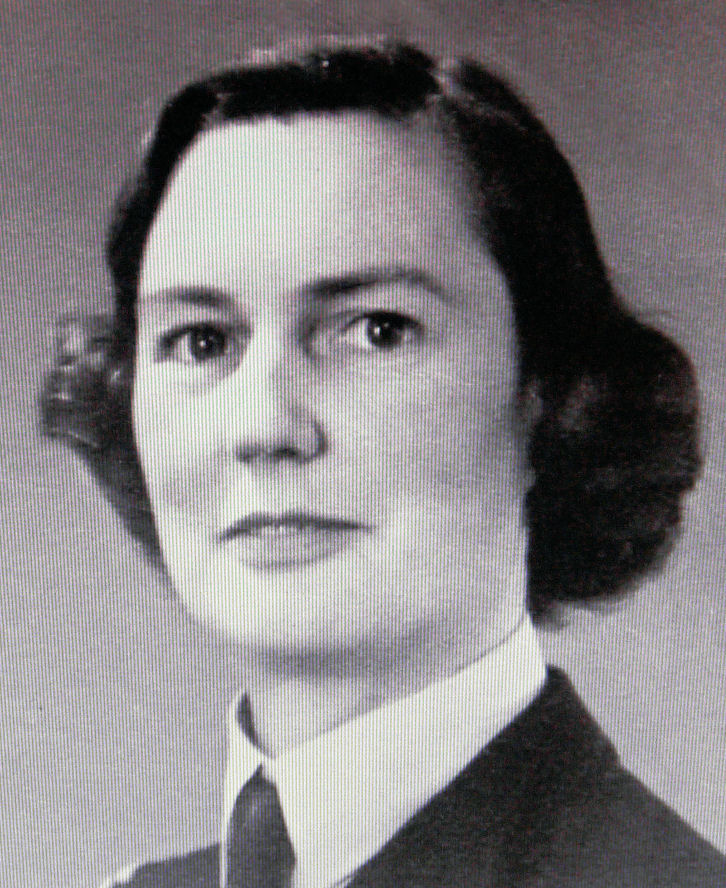
- Born: Honor Isabel Pitman; 30 October 1912; Kensington, England
- Died: 19 April 1943 (aged 30); Roundway Hill, near Calne, Wiltshire, England
- Cause of death: Plane crash
- Resting place: Dyrham
- Occupation: Air Transport Auxiliary pilot

Honor Salmon (née Pitman) (30 October 1912 – 19 April 1943) was a British First Officer pilot in the Air Transport Auxiliary (ATA) during World War Two. She was one of fifteen women pilots who lost their lives flying in the service of the ATA.

== Early life and education ==
Honor Isabel Pitman was born in Kensington on 30 October 1912 to Francis Isabel (née Butler) and Ernest Pitman. Her mother was Irish and her father was a publisher in the family's Bath-based company Sir Isaac Pitman & Sons along with his father and brother Alfred. Her paternal grandfather Sir Isaac Pitman, was the inventor of shorthand and the family fortune came from his work. She had five siblings, politician and educational theorist Isaac James Pitman (b. 1901), Christian Ernest (b. 1902), John (b. 1907), Peter (b. 1911) and Diana (b. 1914).

Honor Pitman was baptised on 12 December 1912 at Weston All Saints, in Bath, Somerset.

Pitman was educated at Abbot's Hill School and Westonbirt School, in Tetbury, Gloucestershire.

== Flying career ==
Pitman had learned how to fly by the age of 14 but because of her youth and age restrictions on qualifying to undertake lone flying she "always had to fly with someone & could never go to other aerodromes to land" beyond the Bristol and Wessex Aero Club. Pitman was 24 when she qualified for her pilot's licence (No. 14649), issued by the Royal Aero Club, on 23 December 1936 at the Bristol and Wessex Aeroplane Club, flying a B A Swallow with a 85 hp Pobjoy Cataract radial engine. In 1936 Pitman joined the First Aid Nursing Yeomanry (FANY). By 1938 Pitman had travelled to Australia. She had flown 120 hours as a qualified pilot in small Swallows, Cadets and Aeronca aircraft before the start of the Second World War ended civilian flying.

== World War Two - ATS and ATA ==
=== Auxiliary Territorial Service ===
Members of the First Aid Nursing Yeomanry became part of the Auxiliary Territorial Service (ATS) with the outbreak of war and Pitman was initially assigned to the 7th Wiltshire ATS Motor Company, based in Southampton. She was later promoted to Mechanics Section Leader for the 12th Oxford Motor Transport. In the 1939 Census she was listed as living in Mons House in Amesbury, Wiltshire, and working as a driver in the ATS.

In March 1940 Pitman wrote to the Air Transport Auxiliary as she was aware they were seeking qualified women pilots to fly planes in transit. "I would very much like to know if there is the possibility of my joining your section of the service? I am an 'A' pilot & have only done about 120hrs flying in small club planes - Swallows, Cadets and Aroncas, but I am prepared to take any training in any line if I could help you. 4 years ago I joined the FANYs in hopes of a flying section being started, but this never materialized.... I had been hoping on my return from Australia last year to have my own plane & work for my 'B' licence but instead I have had to content myself with reading text books."

=== Air Transport Auxiliary ===
She was eventually invited to take a test flight by the Air Transport Auxiliary but her lack of flying experience meant that she did not join the ATA as a pilot until 15 March 1941.

Pitman was stationed at the ATA's No. 15 Ferry Pool, at Hamble in Southampton with the rank of First Officer pilot. She married soon after joining the ATA and was known as Honor Salmon. She flew 25 different types of aircraft and logged 370 flying hours during her ATA career. Women pilots ferried planes around the UK, from factories to RAF stations and maintenance units.

For a year her flying career went well. On both the 5 and 6 March 1942, she suffered two accidents, one in a Spitfire during taxing, the second in a Hurricane when the starboard undercarriage collapsed. This caused her significant anxiety and she was placed on a month's rest, and then instructed to take a pilot's refresher course. The instructor felt that she had benefitted from this and that she needed to apply more common sense to her flying.

The ATA monitored her flying, particularly after a further accident on 6 August 1942 when she overran the edge of the runway in a Spitfire and the plane nosed over and the propeller was damaged. She was not held responsible for this accident as lack of aerodrome control was identified. She was considered an over-confident pilot at times but well liked by her ATA colleagues. Commandant Pauline Gower described her as "a charming and gallant person."

== Personal life ==
Honor Pitman married Major Henry Methuen Pomeroy Salmon (1901-1953) in St Peter's Church, Dyrham, Gloucestershire, on 20 June 1941, after which she became known as Honor Salmon. Her husband owned Tockington Manor in Gloucestershire. There were no children from the marriage.

== Death and commemoration ==
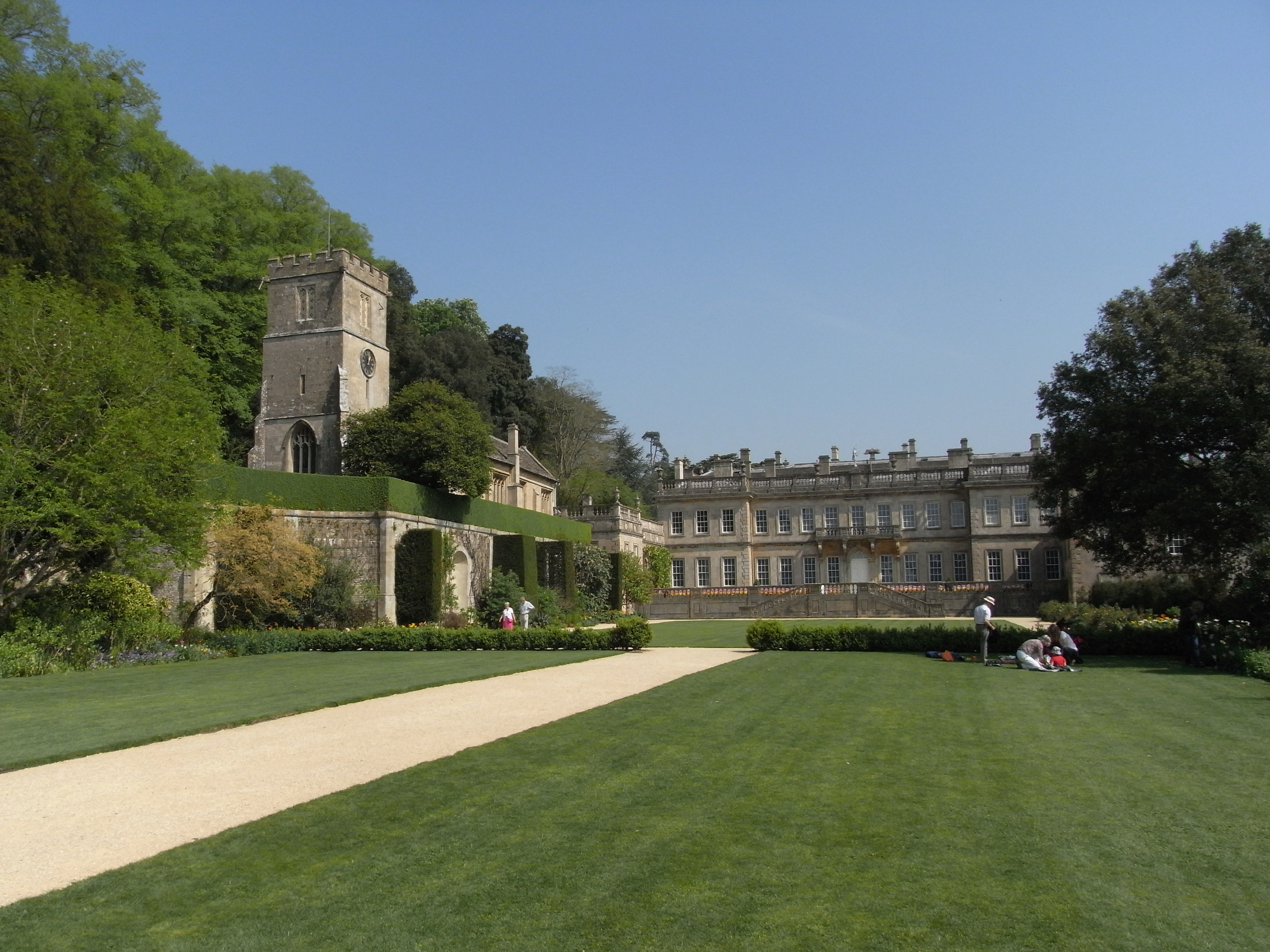
St Peters Church, Dyrham

Honor Salmon died age 30 on 19 April 1943 when the Airspeed Oxford MN765 plane she was transporting in bad weather crashed in a field on high ground at Roundway Hill near Calne in Wiltshire. The ATA investigation found that she had continued to fly in bad weather and was at fault.

She was buried at St Peters, in Dyrham, Gloucestershire, near her family’s home. Two of her brothers who also died in service during the Second World War. Peter Pitman-Butler, a Captain in the 7th Queen's Own Hussars, Royal Armoured Corps, died in July 1940, and was buried in the Cairo War Cemetery, Egypt and John Pitman, a Captain in the 3rd King's Own Hussars, Royal Armoured Corps, was killed in Palestine on 1 October 1943, and buried at the Khayat Beach War Cemetery, Israel. The three siblings are commemorated on a plaque in the church at Dyrham.

Honor Salmon left £32,279 in her will; her husband and brother Christian Earnest Pitman were granted probate in 25 November 1943.
