= Missy Morton =

New Zealand professor of disability studies and inclusive education

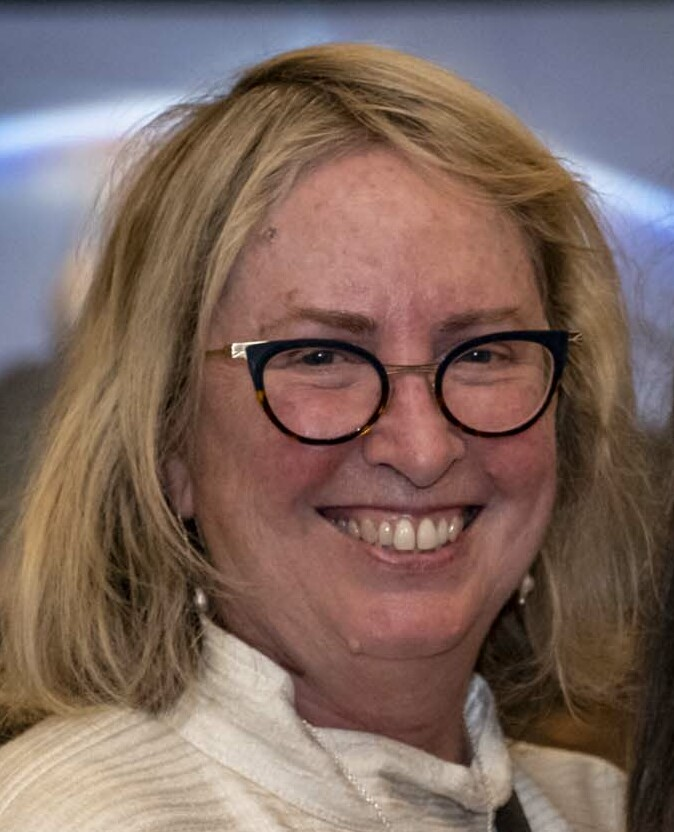
- Morton in 2023
- Other name: Mary Winston Morton

Academic background
- Education: Syracuse University
- Thesis: Silenced in the court: facilitated communication and the meanings of disability and disability research in the legal setting (2006)

Academic work
- Discipline: Disability studies and inclusive education
- Institutions: University of Canterbury, University of Auckland
- Website: University of Auckland profile

Mary Winston "Missy" Morton is a New Zealand academic, and is Professor of Disability Studies and Inclusive Education at the University of Auckland. Her research interests include inclusive curriculum, assessment and pedagogies.

== Academic career ==
Morton completed Bachelor of Arts and Master of Education degrees at the University of Otago, and then a PhD at Syracuse University. Her 2006 doctoral thesis was titled Silenced in the court: facilitated communication and the meanings of disability and disability research in the legal setting. Morton joined the faculty of the University of Canterbury, rising to full professor and becoming head of the School of Education Studies and Leadership in 2012. Morton was also director of the Inclusive and Special Education Research Group at Canterbury. Morton moved to the University of Auckland in 2017, where she is Professor of Disability Studies and Inclusive Education. Morton serves on the Te Tapeke Fair Futures Panel of the Royal Society Te Apārangi, a multidisciplinary panel "of leading Aotearoa experts to consider the implications of equality, equity and fairness", convened in 2019. She has held senior roles in CCS Disability Action and IHC.

Morton's research covers disability studies and inclusive education. She has researched inclusive assessment for secondary teachers, and the creation of curriculum exemplars. Morton carried out a capacity-building project for inclusive teacher education in the Pacific, which was funded by the Ministry of Foreign Affairs and Trade. She contributed to the first New Zealand Disability Strategy as a member of the writing group, and is a founding member of New Zealand's Inclusive Education Action Group.

== Selected works ==
- Jane Harrison; Lesley MacGibbon; Morton, Missy (2001). "Regimes of Trustworthiness in Qualitative Research: The Rigors of Reciprocity". Qualitative Inquiry. 7 (3): 323–345. doi:10.1177/107780040100700305. Wikidata Q124220264.
- David J. Connor; Susan L. Gabel; Deborah J. Gallagher; Morton, Missy (2008). "Disability studies and inclusive education — implications for theory, research, and practice". International Journal of Inclusive Education. 12 (5–6): 441–457. doi:10.1080/13603110802377482. Wikidata Q125142328.
- David Mills; Morton, Missy (2013), Ethnography in Education, doi:10.4135/9781446251201, Wikidata Q125142353
- Nancy Higgins; MacArthur, Jude; Morton, Missy (2007). "Winding Back the Clock: The Retreat of New Zealand Inclusive Education Policy". The New Zealand Annual Review of Education. 17. doi:10.26686/nzaroe.v0i17.1528. Wikidata Q125142351.
- Ruth Millar; Morton, Missy (2007). "Bridging two worlds: special education and curriculum policy". International Journal of Inclusive Education. 11 (2): 163–176. doi:10.1080/13603110500375382. Wikidata Q125142327.
- Morton, Missy; Trish McMenamin; Geoff Moore; Sue Molloy (2012). "Assessment that matters: The transformative potential of narrative assessment for students with special education needs". Assessment Matters. 4: 110–128. doi:10.18296/am.0105. Wikidata Q125142349.
- Douglas Biklen; Mary Winston Morton; Shaswati Nina Saha; et al. (1991). ""I Amn Not a Utistivc on Thje Typ" ("I'm Not Autistic on the Typewriter")". Disability, handicap & society. 6 (3): 161–180. doi:10.1080/02674649166780231. Wikidata Q125143415.
- Bernadette Macartney; Morton, Missy (2013). "Kinds of participation: teacher and special education perceptions and practices of 'inclusion' in early childhood and primary school settings". International Journal of Inclusive Education. 17 (8): 776–792. doi:10.1080/13603116.2011.602529. Wikidata Q125142331.
