= The Reading Teacher =

- Discipline: Education
- Language: English
- Edited by: Jan Lacina, Robin Griffith

Publication details
- History: 1947-present
- Publisher: Wiley-Blackwell on behalf of the International Literacy Association
- Frequency: Bimonthly
- Impact factor: 0.770 (2011)

Standard abbreviations
- ISO 4: Read. Teach.

Indexing
- CODEN: REDTAH
- ISSN: 0034-0561 (print); 1936-2714 (web)
- LCCN: 58026936
- OCLC no.: 01681346

Links
- Journal homepage; Online access; Online archive

The Reading Teacher is a peer-reviewed academic journal published six times per year by Wiley-Blackwell. The current editors are Jan Lacina (Texas Christian University) and Robin Griffith (Texas Christian University). The Reading Teacher is one of three journals published on behalf of the International Literacy Association. It covers practical teaching ideas, research, and professional development for teachers of children up to age 12.

According to the Journal Citation Reports, the journal has a 2011 impact factor of 0.770, ranking it 93rd out of 203 journals in the category "Education & Educational Research".
