= Letitia Fickel =

New Zealand education academic and academic administrator

Letitia Cope Hochstrasser Fickel
- Born: March 16, 1963
- Education: University of Louisville
- Scientific career
- Fields: Teaching
- Workplaces: University of Alaska Anchorage, University of Canterbury
- Thesis: Teacher culture and community : an ethnography of a high school social studies department (1998)

Letitia Cope Hochstrasser Fickel (born 16 March 1963) is a New Zealand education academic and academic administrator. She is currently a full professor and acting pro-vice chancellor at the University of Canterbury.

== Academic career ==
After a 1998 EdD at the University of Louisville titled 'Teacher culture and community : an ethnography of a high school social studies department,' Fickel worked at the University of Alaska Anchorage before moving to the University of Canterbury in 2010.

== Selected works ==
- Darling-Hammond, Linda, Maritza B. Macdonald, Jon Snyder, Betty Lou Whitford, Gordon Ruscoe, and Letitia Fickel. Studies of Excellence in Teacher Education: Preparation at the Graduate Level. AACTE Publications, 1307 New York Avenue, NW, Suite 300, Washington, DC 20005-4701, 2000.
- Fickel, Letitia Hochstrasser. "Democracy is messy: Exploring the personal theories of a high school social studies teacher." Theory & Research in Social Education 28, no. 3 (2000): 359–389.
- Fickel, Letitia Hochstrasser. "Quality professional development: Suggestions about process and content." In The educational forum, vol. 67, no. 1, pp. 47–54. Taylor & Francis Group, 2003.
- Fickel, Letitia. "Paradox of practice: Expanding and contracting curriculum in a high-stakes climate." Measuring history: Cases of state-level testing across the United States (2006): 75–103.
- Fickel, Letitia Hochstrasser. "Teachers, tundra, and talking circles: Learning history and culture in an Alaska Native village." Theory & Research in Social Education 33, no. 4 (2005): 476–507.
