= John M. Culkin =

American academic and priest (1928–1993)

Academic background
- Education: Harvard University

Academic work
- Discipline: media studies

John M. Culkin Jr. (June 21, 1928 – July 23, 1993) was an American academic and former priest who was a leading media scholar and critic, educator, writer and consultant.

== Early life and education ==
He was born in 1928 to an Irish-Catholic family from Brooklyn. He and his brother Gerald attended Xavier High School, an elite Jesuit College Preparatory High School, in Manhattan, where he was on the basketball team. He graduated from there in 1950 and then entered the Society of Jesus. He attended Bellarmine College, was ordained at Fordham University, and received a doctorate in education from Harvard University.

== Career ==
At the seminary, he first became interested in media studies. Later, at the Harvard Graduate School of Education, his dissertation was a curriculum to study film. There, he also met Marshall McLuhan; they became lifelong colleagues because of their mutual interest in mass media and its effect on society. McLuhan appointed Culkin to a position at the University of Toronto. In 1964, Culkin came to Fordham University, convinced them to hire McLuhan for a year, and earned a reputation as an intellectual for his interest in media studies.

In 1969, Culkin left the Jesuit priesthood and formed the Center for Understanding Media, named after a McLuhan book. He started a master's program through the center to study media, which was initially at Antioch College and subsequently moved to the New School for Social Research, where he remained until 1978. There, his Center for Understanding Media administered the film portion of the Artists in Schools program of the National Endowment for the Arts and created a forum for filmmakers in the education field to preview important films, the Metropolitan Area Film Instructors Association.

Culkin advocated media studies in public school systems. He observed that children watch television thousands of more hours than they study. Culkin knew that films, radio, and TV profoundly affect young people. He believed that even young children should be taught to analyze mass media, new means of communication should enhance education, and programming quality should be improved and focused on childhood development. He came to believe that children should examine the arts as experience, to develop their own positive value system.

Culkin advised the creators of Sesame Street. In 1964, he helped organize parochial school instruction in TV. In 1970, he proposed a special cable TV channel for children.

After 1973, he promoted Unifon, a 40-character phonemic English alphabet, to combat illiteracy.

On October 7, 1974, he testified before the House Select Subcommittee on Education, which later decided to create the American Film Institute as an independent agency.

Culkin formed Hearth Communications, a private consulting firm, with business partner Frank Maguire. Their consulting client list soon became the important international corporations and organizations.

Indicative of his varied interests and expertise, Culkin published many articles and wrote several books. He analyzed how a story might be told in print, film, and television, in a book called "Trilogy." Other topics for his articles included theology, the Chicago Cubs, Trachtenberg system of math, the Dvorak keyboard layout, and how to make the calendar more accurate.

The Media Ecology Association annual awards includes The John Culkin Award for Outstanding Praxis in the Field of Media Ecology.

== Selected works ==
- Films Deliver: Teaching Creatively with Film. Anthony Schillaci and John M. Culkin, Editors. New York: Citation Press, 1970. ISBN 0-590-09155-7
- Film study in the high school: An analysis and rationale (1995) ISBN 0-9649723-0-1
- Doing the Media: A Portfolio of Activities, Ideas, and Resources (1978) (as editor?) ISBN 0-07-010336-4

== Quotes ==
Culkin summarized the driving force behind his life work in a 1981 interview with Maria P. Robbins, then a Contributing Editor for Television and Children Journal.

“So trying to keep certain things off television or out of books is futile. That same energy should be applied to helping children develop their own capacities for judgment, taste and sensitivity, so that they know how to make decisions that are based, we hope, on positive values.”
