= Niki Davis =

New Zealand computer scientist

- Occupations: Academic and researcher
- Known for: Informing how teaching, leadership and research can effectively manage e-learning.

Academic background
- Education: Bachelor of Science Honours (University of Edinburgh).; Certificate for Vocational Preparation Tutors (Royal Academy Schools - Royal Academy of Arts).; 1996: Doctor of Philosophy (Queen's University Belfast).

Academic work
- Discipline: Educational research
- Notable ideas: Educational systems being prepared for a digital learning world

Niki Davis is an educator and researcher based in Aotearoa New Zealand.

Her research explores how teaching, learning and assessment can be inclusive and ethically managed in non-traditional spaces involving E-learning, while acknowledging the role of the knowledge of indigenous peoples in assisting to build critically reflective research communities.

She worked in universities in the United Kingdom and the United States before becoming a Distinguished Professor at the University of Canterbury in 2008, retiring and becoming Professor Emeritus in 2020. Davis has been involved in a range of initiatives and organisations that promote knowledge of digital technologies in education and is widely published in this field.

== Career ==
Davis was raised in Ireland, and started her career as a professor of Telematics at the University of Exeter in 1995, later becoming a part-time professor of ICT in Education in the University of London Knowledge Lab. From 2000 to 2008, she was a professor of Curriculum and Instruction and Director of the Center for Technology in Learning and Teaching at Iowa State University. She moved to New Zealand in 2008 and joined the University of Canterbury's College of Education, noting that "she was attracted to the University by its desire to be a leader with new technologies to benefit society, including indigenous peoples." Davis was a Distinguished Professor of e-learning at the University of Canterbury from 2008 until 2020 when she retired and became Professor Emeritus, while remaining associated with the e-Learning Research Lab that she had set up in 2008, specifically as an adjunct staff member and Associated Lab Leader at the University of Canterbury's Child Well-being Research Institute.

== Associations ==
Davis was President of the Distance Education Association of New Zealand (DEANZ) and, after the organisation changed its name to the 'Flexible Learning Association of New Zealand (FLANZ)', she was editor of the Journal of Open, Flexible and Distance Learning from 2014 to 2017 when she stood down and took on the Associate Editor role. Davis was thanked for the "care and expertise she has provided to both the Journal and the Editorial Team".

In 2020, Davis was acknowledged for her contributions toward the setting up of A Better Start, one of 11 New Zealand Government-funded National Science Challenges, and as a member of the Successful Learning team on the Challenge.

She is a Research Advisor to the Better Start Literacy Approach programme and served on the advisory board of the National Language Foreign Resource Centre, the University of Hawaiʻi at Mānoa from 2014 to 2017.

== Research ==
=== Learning in a global context ===
In 1996, the European Commission released the Report of the Task Force: Educational Software and Multimedia Task force report which Davis said indicated the high priority that was being placed on the importance of distant learning techniques into education systems so that location no longer determined the ability of people to become skilled and educated.

The globalisation of education and the need for teachers to be trained in the use of information communications technology (ICT) to incorporate global themes into learning, became a research focus for Davis. In 1999, she developed a set of principles for future teacher education that would use research to understand the role of ICT in increasing access to learning on a global scale and "stimulating rich contexts for critical reflection". Davis drew attention to the challenges for society as the world adjusted to a collaborative environment and the importance of the teaching profession becoming more evidence-based. In the same paper, Davis noted that this was about fitting education into complex cultures by integrating new technologies into an inclusive approach to understanding inequalities.

=== Intercultural interactions ===
How ICT could facilitate intercultural interactions within a global educational environment was a theme visited often by Davis. In 2005, she was an editor of a special issue of Contemporary Issues in Technology and Teacher Education and took the stance that intercultural education was a general term pertaining to the ability to "understand, empathize with, and respect all ethnicities" and part of gaining competence in this area involved understanding that education was global and could involve the facilitation of distance learning technologies such as "e-mail, Internet, and computer simulations", which required specific pre-service training for teachers.

=== Effective leadership ===
Between 2001 and 2005, Davis was a project partner in International Leadership in Educational Technology (ILET), a research project that investigated the establishment of a PhD specialization in Intercultural Educational Technology (IET). This was an acknowledgement of the new information and communication technologies that were happening internationally in schools and universities and the importance of these for teacher training and research. Follow up papers to this research, co-authored by Davis, noted that the project had highlighted the need to "extend the cultural and theoretical perspectives beyond the historically dominant European cultures", and that "while the project has also dispelled any naïve beliefs as to our ability to effect widespread change in our universities...[it had]... confirmed [the] belief that communication technologies, blended with faculty collaboration and limited student travel, [made] potent ingredients for the preparation of the next generation of leaders of educational technology".

In 2013, Davis was a Principal investigator along with Julie Mackey in collaborative research in a New Zealand school that explored what successful leaders did to integrate digital technologies and how teacher capability could be improved as a result. The study found effective leaders ensured that the relevance of IT learning was aligned with the school's vision, that teachers were supported to experience the new technologies before using them in their classes and increasing the expectation of staff to be innovative risk-takers, committed to using these to improve student learning.

=== Distance learning ===
Davis's work began to focus on virtual learning and distance education, and after co-authoring an article noting research in the United States that had shown by 2005 almost one-third of US public schools had students involved in this type of learning, she collaborated to produce a comprehensive analysis of this research that included clear definitions of the concepts and details of the educational teamwork in the US schools that was essential in making the programmes effective. Involvement in a project, Teacher Education Goes Into Virtual Schooling (TEGIVS) from 2005 to 2008, resulted in Davis collaborating on research that addressed the concerns and misconceptions held about virtual schooling. Several papers on the research clarified that it was different from adult distance learning because a facilitator needed to be the same site as the learner (in person). It noted that common misconceptions and concerns around virtual schooling included threats to careers, possible "academic dishonesty, reduced interaction, teacher feedback, and lack of rigour...[but concluded that]...The curriculum innovations in this innovative teacher preparation program were shown to address these misconceptions and concerns and facilitate understanding and acceptance of VS as an alternative form of education by many of these pre-service teachers".

Blended learning was investigated in a New Zealand School in 2011 with data collected from observations of online and face-to-face learning and interviews with the teachers and students. The paper for this case study set the context within initiatives by the New Zealand Ministry of Education, including laptops for teachers, the rollout of fast internet connectivity and the establishment of a national Virtual Learning Network involving clusters of schools. Identified positive outcomes included flexibility of learning, the development of higher-level critical thinking skills by students and professional growth for teachers, while challenges noted were about access to ICT, lack of experience of teachers and the need for more school infrastructure to support the process. Following the 2010 Canterbury earthquake, an investigation by Davis revealed that the necessary virtual schooling in the area at the time had been a community success and recognised the value of engaging in twenty-first-century education in a fast-changing world.

The COVID-19 pandemic that began around 2020 led to widespread distance learning by school-age children in many countries, including Aotearoa, New Zealand. There were challenges learning online from home and some of the inequities were explored by the Greater Christchurch Schools' Network's (GCSN) survey of schools in its region in 2020, published as Closing the Digital Divide during the COVID-19 Lockdown: Student, whānau and staff perspectives . In the forward to this report, Steve Wakefield, Chairman of the Trust explained: "The GCSN is a charitable trust which works to bridge the digital divide for school-aged students and their whānau through the development, implementation, and evaluation of programmes and initiatives in the greater Christchurch region. The findings of this report highlight the ongoing impact of the digital divide, particularly for students keeping up with their peers while learning from home. It demonstrates the importance of continuing local and national initiatives to bridge that divide for school-aged students". The author, Dr Gabrielle Wall, General Manager of GCSN, stated that "this was a huge learning curve for everyone, but what it highlights is that students on average liked being able to learn via digital tools. The challenge is to make sure that all students have equal access to digital tools and connectivity". As a member of the GCSN Board, Davis advised upon and reviewed this report. She also supported the leadership of Professor Amina Chariana to bridge even more extensive divides in India and deploy e-learning to reach underserved children in many states. Charaina's 2022 book Integrated Approach to Technology in Education in India included a chapter on integrating information technology in the Covid era.

=== Traditional knowledge ===
Davis co-presented at the Annual Conference of the Australian Association for Research in Education (2009) and noted the work that had been done in New Zealand to build an awareness that kaupapa Māori and action research were not incompatible, particularly if there was a shared acceptance of the importance of critical analysis of the role of research in varied historical contexts. Davis has reflected that "cultural inclusiveness of online spaces" was important, and when experts at the UNESCO-hosted Edusummit in 2011 highlighted the need for a radical restructuring of schools, including reaching indigenous peoples with ICT, she responded with an urgent call for "visionary leadership" in New Zealand education in response to the challenges and importance of engaging with Māori. In 2014, Davis co-presented a paper noting that the New Zealand Ministry of Education was developing pilot programmes to explore inclusive approaches to meeting the needs of priority groups such as Māori, Pasifika and students with special needs. Davis had previously collaborated on research into how Māori had adopted digital technologies in Aotearoa New Zealand. It was noted in the abstract "[that the researchers located] their exploration in a discussion of the historical context of colonisation, Māori movement towards self-determination, and in a discussion of Māori values and approaches to knowledge...[and]...the ways Māori have taken and adapted digital technologies for a range of broadly defined educational purposes."

== Awards ==
Davis was awarded the first Outstanding Global Educator by the International Society of Information Technology and Teacher Education in 2010.

== Selected publications ==
- Digital Technologies and Change in Education (2017): A book by Davis that explored a framework for analysis of educational practices and systems as they responded to meeting the challenges of digital education.
- Digital technology, communities and education (2004):A book co-edited by Davis.
- Using IT Effectively in Teaching and Learning (1998): This book, co-edited by Bridget Somekh and Davis, considered "cultural, sociological and psychological factors that [influenced] how IT [was] used" by critically examining the potential of IT, teachers' professional development and strategies to manage this in schools or departments. In this book, Davis co-authored a chapter, Can quality in learning be enhanced through the use of IT? which looked at how IT could develop more independent students as teachers questioned their traditional roles as holders and presenters of knowledge.
