= The Journal of Educational Research =

- Discipline: Education
- Language: English
- Edited by: Mary F. Heller

Publication details
- History: 1920-present
- Publisher: Taylor and Francis
- Frequency: Bimonthly
- Impact factor: 1.197 (2016)

Standard abbreviations
- ISO 4: J. Educ. Res.

Indexing
- ISSN: 0022-0671 (print); 1940-0675 (web)
- LCCN: 61058068
- OCLC no.: 648003037

Links
- Journal homepage; Online access; Online archive

The Journal of Educational Research is a bimonthly peer-reviewed academic journal covering research into education. It was established in 1920 and is published by Taylor & Francis. The editor-in-chief is Mary F. Heller (University of Hawaiʻi at West Oʻahu). According to the Journal Citation Reports, the journal has a 2016 impact factor of 1.197.
