= SaypYu =

Approximative phonetic alphabet

SaypYu (originally SaypU) (/ˈsaɪpjuː/ SY-pew; acronym for "Spell As You Pronounce Universal alphabet project") is an approximative phonetic alphabet of 24 alphabet letters to spell languages, including English. The spelling system was developed by the Syrian banker Jaber George Jabbour to write English more phonetically. The 24-letter alphabet includes 23 Roman alphabet letters (after excluding "c", "q", and "x") and the addition of a 24th letter, the IPA letter "ɘ" (close-mid central unrounded vowel) to play the role of schwa. The letter represents the initial sound of "ago" or "about".

"ɘ"
schwa

The SaypYu project promotes "the simple universal phonetic alphabet" which is intended to facilitate a quick and convenient writing system for verbally penetrating foreign situations and pronouncing unusual place-names reasonably quickly and accurately. The official website of the project has published thousands of words in amended phonetic system inviting others to make suggestions, additions, and corrections as a collaborative project.

SaypYu is not intended to replace, but to complement the International Phonetic Alphabet (IPA) which is used in professional dictionaries. It currently borrows the "ɘ" directly from the IPA, but possibly this may be replaced by a * or @ when unavailable.

The system, while based on phonetic alphabet, represents phonemics instead. Similar sounds are written identically, such as how the th-sounds found in English are both spelt with th while the IPA distinguishes /θ/ in "thin" and /ð/ in this.

== Origin ==
The Times Education Editor (Greg Hurst) reported in the article "Learning a new language? It's as easy as ABK!":

It was on an aircraft, late at night, that a former investment banker had the idea that he thinks could change the world.

Staring at safety instructions in English and Portuguese, Jaber Jabbour asked himself why two European languages using the Latin alphabet could sound so different.

Then it came to Mr Jabbour, whose native tongue is Arabic: why not devise an alphabet that allows words to be spelt out exactly as they sound? Not just in English but any language. The next morning he began doing just that.

The project was launched on 10 December 2012 by Jaber George Jabbour, Director of the Logos Capital Ltd. (UK), who is of Syrian origin, widely travelled and has encountered difficulty pronouncing words spelt in conventional Roman text such as Leicester Square which becomes, in SaypYu: Lestɘr skwer. Its declared purpose is to make pronunciation easier and foster international understanding.

According to BBC Learning English project report by Karen Zarindast "Spell as you Pronounce" in the section Words in the News:

School children in English-speaking countries have difficulty spelling words such as 'people' and 'friend'. They contain the odd vowels which are not pronounced. SaypU suggests it is about time we started spelling what we pronounced and not just in English, but in all languages. Say, for instance, the word 'oui' - or 'yes' in French - would be spelled 'wee'¹ and the word 'Leute' in German - meaning 'people' - as 'loite'². The director of Logos Capital, Jaber George [Jabbour], who is launching the programme today, insists their aim is to help raise worldwide literacy levels by making spelling easier. (Notes ¹ and ²: The original BBC text was based on early work. The presentations 'wii' and 'loytə' in replacement of 'wee' and 'loite' above are phonetically closer.)

== SaypYu Alphabet letters ==
The SaypYu alphabet uses the normal English alphabet, with the removal of C, Q and X and the addition of Ǝ, which is called schwaa, but perhaps better described as 'reversed e', since schwa is actually an 'e' rotated upside-down rather than flipped horizontally.

Letter	Name
A a	aa
B b	bii
D d	dey
E e	ekow
F f	fay
G g	gii
H h	heytsh
I i	in
J j	jey
K k	key
L l	ley
M m	muu
N n	nii
O o	ow
P p	pey
R r	row
S s	suu
T t	tii
U u	uu
V v	vow
W w	wey
Y y	yet
Z z	zii
Ǝ ɘ	shwaa

== IPA to SaypYu Map ==
IPA symbols	SaypYu symbols
/a/	a
æ	a
ɑ	a, aa
ɑː	aa
ɑ̃	aan
e, ε	e, ee
e:	ee
ɛ̃	en, an
ɪ	i
iː	ii
o	o
ɔ	o, oo
ɔ:	o, oo
ɔ̃	on
/u/	u
/ʊ/	u
y	uu, uɘ, uy
uː	uu
ui	uy
ə	ɘ
ø	ɘɘ
œ	ɘɘ
œ̃	an
eɪ	ey
aɪ	ay
æʊ	aw
aʊ	aw
oʊ	ow
ɔɪ	oy
j	y
ʎ	y
ʝ	y
w	w
ɥ	w
b	b
d	d
f	f
ɡ	g
h	h
k	k
x	kh
l	l
m	m
n	n
p	p

/t͡ʃ/ is spelled as simply tsh.

== Criticism ==
The project was aired on Canadian national radio. The presenter Anna Maria Tremonti interviewed:

- Dennis Baron, professor of English and linguistics at the University of Illinois, noted that a common linguistic understanding existed between the American colonists and the British authorities in 1773, and there have been numerous civil wars, such as that of 1861–1865, which have tended to be resolved not by talking, but by military force. He acknowledged the failure of Esperanto to gain adherents, but speculated that may be because of a cultural deficiency—while SaypYu sought to preserve existing linguistic cultures, much of English culture is bound up with its quirky spelling—in short, it needs to be expanded to be useful. He noted that a German president has suggested English should be an EU utility language.
- Henry Hitchings, a British journalist and the author of The Language Wars: A History of Proper English, observed that there were numerous similar proposals, and that the IPA had identified 107 distinct sounds plus diacritics. Accordingly, he doubted that SaypYu could currently cope with tonal languages, but accepted that this may be addressed if the system develops. The limitations were too great for many languages.

== See also ==
- English-language spelling reform
- Experimental phonetics
- Index of phonetics articles
- International Phonetic Alphabet
- Phonemic orthography
- Phonetic alphabet (disambiguation)
- Spelling reform
