= Unifon =

Latin-based phonemic orthography for American English

The beginning of the Lord's Prayer, rendered in modern Unifon (two fonts), and in standard English orthography

Unifon is a defunct Latin-based phonemic orthography for American English designed in the mid-1950s by John R. Malone, a Chicago economist and newspaper equipment consultant.

It was developed into a teaching aid to help children acquire reading and writing skills. Like the pronunciation key in a dictionary, Unifon attempts to match each of the sounds of spoken English with a single symbol, though not all sounds are distinguished, for example, reduced vowels in other American dialects that do not occur in Chicago. The method was tested in Chicago, Indianapolis and elsewhere during the 1960s and 1970s, but no statistical analysis of the outcome was ever published in an academic journal. Interest by educators has been limited, and its last formal use (for the Tolowa language) was abandoned in 1996, but enthusiasts continued to publicize the scheme and advocate for its adoption as late as 2012.

== Alphabet ==
The modern Unifon alphabet

The Unifon alphabet contains 40 glyphs, intended to represent the 40 "most important sounds" of the English language. Although the set of sounds has remained the same, several of the symbols were changed over the years, making modern Unifon somewhat different from Old Unifon.

Of the 66 letters used in the various Unifon alphabets, 43 of the capitals can be unified with existing Unicode characters. Small letters are printed as small capitals. Fewer of them are available in Unicode as dedicated small-cap forms, but the usual Latin minuscules can be made small-cap in a Unifon font. Unifon is the same as English but with extra letters. Letters have corresponding IPA phonemes below them.

The latest Unifon alphabet for English
A	[Δ]	Ʌ	B	Ȼ	D	E	[𐊑]	[Ԙ]	F	G	H	Ɪ	[⼟]	J	K	L	M	N	[ᴎ]
/æ/	/eɪ/	/ɔ, ɑ/	/b/	/tʃ/	/d/	/ɛ/	/iː/	/ɝ, ɚː/	/f/	/ɡ/	/h/	/ɪ/	/aɪ/	/dʒ/	/k/	/l/	/m/	/n/	/ŋ/
O	[𐠣]	[ⵀ]	[ꐎ]	[ტ]	P	R	S	Ꟍ	T	[Ћ]	[Һ]	U	[⩌]	[U̲]	V	W	[𑪽]	Y	Ƶ
/ɒː/	/oʊ/	/ʊ/	/aʊ/	/ɔɪ/	/p/	/ɹ/	/s/	/ʃ/	/t/	/ð/	/θ/	/ʌ, ə/	/u/	/ju, jʌ/	/v/	/w/	/ʒ/	/j/	/z/

Other letters include:

Other letters historically used in Unifon
C	[Ч]	Ↄ	Ǝ	[𝽮]		Ø		Ɵ	Ʇ	[Ɯ]		X	X̄
/s/	/tʃ/	[tʃ]	/ɝ, ɚː/	/eɪ/	/aɪ/	/ʊ/	/ɔɪ/	/θ/	/ð/	/ju/	/tɬ/	/x/	/ɣ/

Some fonts may have Unifon symbols in Private Use Areas.

== History ==
Under a contract with the Bendix Corporation, Malone created the alphabet as part of a larger project. When the International Air Transport Association selected English as the language of international airline communications in 1957, the market that Bendix had foreseen for Unifon ceased to exist, and his contract was terminated. According to Malone, Unifon surfaced again when his son, then in kindergarten, complained that he could still not read. Malone recovered the alphabet to teach his son.

Beginning before 1960 and continuing into the 1980s, Margaret S. Ratz used Unifon to teach first-graders at Principia College in Elsah, Illinois. By the summer of 1960, the ABC-TV affiliate station in Chicago produced a 90-minute program in which Ratz taught three children how to read, in "17 hours with cookies and milk," as Malone described it. In a presentation to parents and teachers, Ratz said, "Some have called Unifon 'training wheels for reading', and that's what it really is. Unifon will be used for a few weeks, or perhaps a few months, but during this time your child will discover there is a great similarity between Unifon and what he sees on TV screens, in comics or road signs, and on cereal boxes. Soon he finds with amusement that he can read the 'old people's alphabet' as easily as he can read and write in Unifon."

During the following two years, Unifon gained national attention, with coverage from NBC's Today Show and CBS's On the Road with Charles Kuralt (in a segment called "The Day They Changed the Alphabet").

In 1981, Malone turned over the Unifon project to Dr. John M. Culkin, a media scholar who was a former Jesuit priest and Harvard School of Education graduate. Culkin wrote numerous articles about Unifon, including several in Science Digest.

In 2000, the Unifon-related web site, www.unifon.org, was created by Pat Katzenmaier with much input from linguist Steve Bett. It has served since then as a central point for organization of Unifon-related efforts.

== Unifon for Native American languages ==
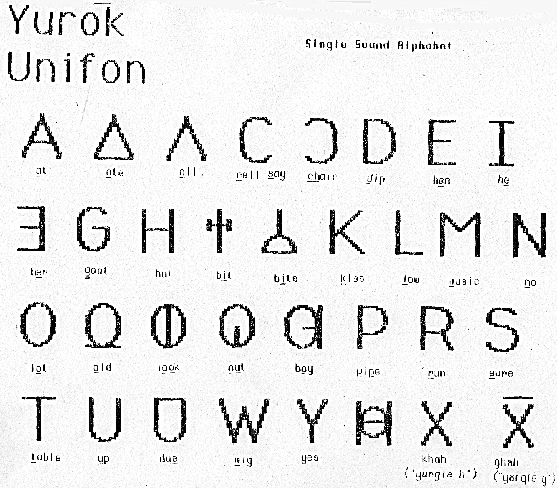
The Unifon alphabet for Yurok

In the 1970s and 1980s, a systematic attempt was made to adapt Unifon as a spelling system for several Native American languages. The chief driving force behind this effort was Tom Parsons of Humboldt State University, who developed spelling schemes for Hupa, Yurok, Tolowa, and Karok, which were then improved by native scholars. In spite of skepticism from linguists, years of work went into teaching the schemes, and numerous publications were written using them. In the end, however, once Parsons left the university, the impetus faded; other orthographies are now used for all of the languages, though people taught in Unifon may still write in it today.

The Unifon alphabet for Hupa
ⴷ	B	C	Ↄ	D	E	Ɪ	J	G	H	K	L	M	N	O	S	T	U	W	Y	X	Ƶ	X̄

The Unifon alphabet for Karuk
A	C	Ↄ	Ɪ	F	H	K	M	N	O	P	R	S	T	Ɵ	U	V	W	Y	X

The Unifon alphabet for Tolowa
X	B	C	Ↄ	D	E	Ɪ	G	H	J	K	L	M	N	O	P	R	S	T	U	W	Y

The Unifon alphabet for Yurok
A	Ʌ	C	Ↄ	E	Ɪ	Ǝ	G	H	K	L	M	N	O	P	R	S	T	U	W	Y	X	X̄

== Encoding ==
=== Character set support ===
The special non-ASCII characters used in the Unifon alphabet have been assigned code points in one of the Private Use Areas by the ConScript Unicode Registry. Several fonts devoted to Unifon are offered at the official website.

=== Language tagging ===
IETF language tags have registered unifon as a variant subtag identifying text as written in Unifon. It is limited to certain language tags: en, hup, kyh, tol, yur.

== See also ==
- Blissymbols – Ideographic writing system
- English Phonotypic Alphabet – 19th century phonetic alphabet for the English language
- Initial Teaching Alphabet – Aid for teaching English reading

== Sources ==
- "The Unifon Alphabet".
- Malone, John R. "Do we need a new alphabet?" (pdf).
- Ratz, Margaret S. (1966). Unifon: A design for teaching reading. Western Pub. Educational Services.
- Hinton, Leanne (2001). "Ch 19. New Writing Systems". In Hinton L, Hale K (ed.). The Green Book of Language Revitalization in Practice: Toward a Sustainable World. Emerald Group Publishing. ISBN 978-0-12-349354-5.
- Culkin, John (1977). "The Alphubet". Media and Methods. 14: 58–61.
