= James Pitman =

British businessman, civil servant, publisher, politician & spelling reformer

Sir James Pitman KBE
- Born: 14 August 1901; Kensington
- Died: 1 September 1985 (aged 84); Kensington
- Education: Master of Arts in Modern History
- Alma mater: Summer Fields School, Eton College and Christ Church, Oxford
- Known for: initial teaching alphabet
- Notable work: Alphabets & Reading, the Initial Teaching Alphabet
- Political party: Conservative Party
- Spouse: Hon. Margaret Beaufort Lawson-Johnston (Order of Mercy)
- Children: Margaret Pitman, Michael Ian Pitman, Peter John Pitman, David Christian Pitman
- Parents: Ernest Pitman (father); Frances Pitman née Butler (mother)
- Relatives: Siblings: Christian Pitman, Major John Pitman, Honor Isabel Pitman, Diana O. Pitman, Captain Peter Pitman Butler; Grandfather: Sir Isaac Pitman

Sir Isaac James Pitman, KBE (14 August 1901 – 1 September 1985) was a publisher, senior civil servant, politician, and educationalist with a lifelong passion for etymology, orthography, and pedagogy. He attempted to improve children's literacy in the English-speaking world by means of an interim teaching orthography, known as the Initial Teaching Alphabet (ITA). He was honoured with a knighthood in 1961 for his life accomplishments.

James Pitman followed his grandfather, Isaac Pitman, by exploring and expanding the pedagogical theories on teaching children to read the English language. Pitman obsessively studied English etymology, alphabets and orthography. He then argued that the overarching cause of reading difficulty in children was the phonetic irregularity of the English language. He compiled and published his analysis in his major work, Alphabets and Reading (1965).

Pitman postulated that if children were taught using an interim orthography consisting of an alphabet and spelling system which were phonetically regular, then they would learn to read quickly and easily and so alleviate the problem of poor literacy which plagued the English-speaking world. He used his position as a leading politician and educationalist along with the resources and connections from his global printing and publishing business to develop and launch the Initial Teaching Alphabet (ITA), which was initially taken up rapidly with its use expanding to 4,000 schools in the UK and 17,000 schools worldwide, before falling out of favour in the 1970s.

== Early life ==
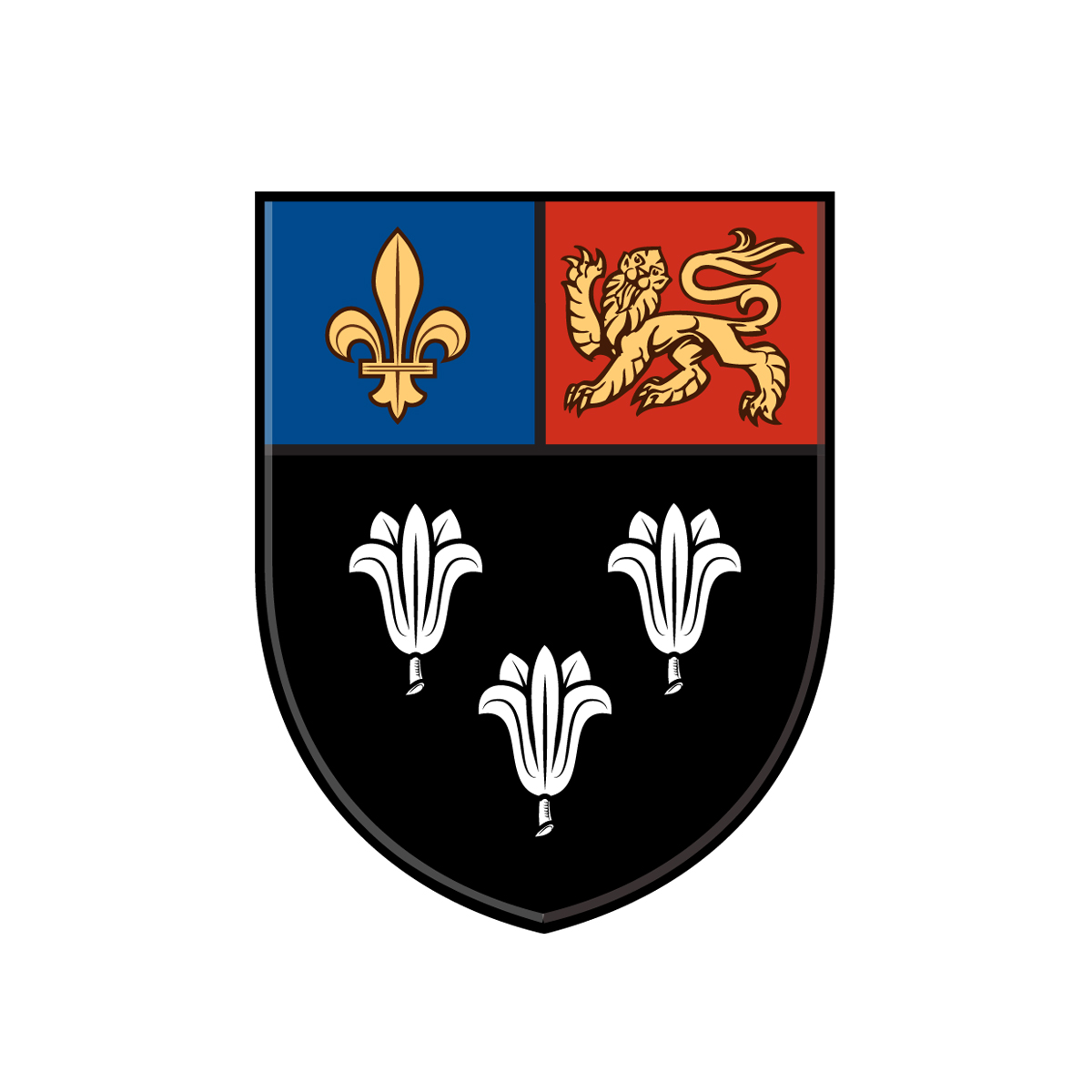
Pitman attended Eton College

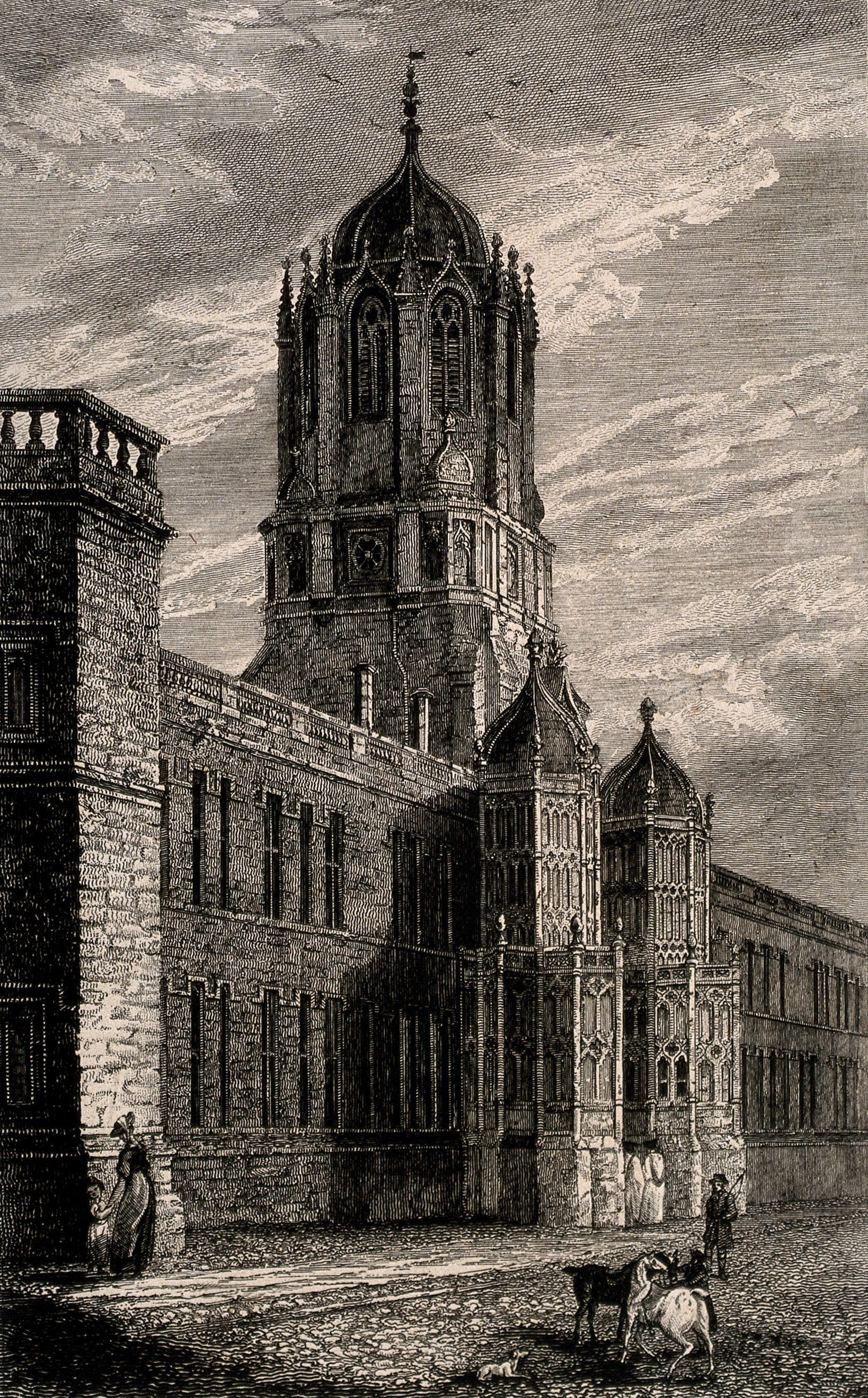
Pitman attended Christ Church, Oxford

Isaac James Pitman was born in Kensington, London, on the 14th of August 1901. His father was Ernest Pitman, and his mother was Frances Isabel Pitman, née Butler. He was the eldest child in the family and had five other siblings, but three were killed in the Second World War:

- Christian Ernest Pitman, born 28 Nov 1902
- Major John Pitman, born 22 Jan 1907 (killed in military action in Palestine, during World War II)
- Captain Peter Pitman Butler, born 05 Mar 1911 (killed in military action in Egypt, during World War II)
- First Officer Honor Isabel Pitman, (married name Salmon) born 30 Oct 1912 (killed while piloting an Airspeed Oxford for the Air Transport Auxiliary in 1943, during World War II).
- Diana O. Pitman, born 1914

Pitman's grandfather was Isaac Pitman, who had developed the Shorthand writing known as Pitman shorthand; in consequence, Isaac James Pitman went by his middle name 'James' to differentiate himself from his grandfather. The innovations made by his grandfather were monetized into the family business, Sir Isaac Pitman and Sons Ltd. Due to this fact, James Pitman was born into a wealthy family and received a privileged upbringing, being educated at the elite Summer Fields School, Eton College and Christ Church, Oxford where he graduated with a Master of Arts (MA) in Modern History.

== Personal life ==
In 1927, Pitman married into the British nobility when he wed Margaret Beaufort Lawson Johnston (known as 'Beau') who was the daughter of George Lawson Johnston, 1st Baron Luke and Edith Laura St. John; they had four children together.

== Sports ==
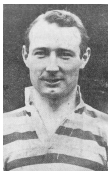
Pitman played rugby for Bath

Pitman was a natural sportsman and excelled in athletics, skiing and boxing in which he won the Public Schools middleweight boxing championship of 1919.

However, his principal sporting passion was rugby union, in which he played as a running Wing Three-Quarters. Pitman gained his 'blue' at the Oxford University Rugby Football Club (RFC) in 1921, but his main playing career was for Bath Rugby Football Club (RFC) in 61 appearances between 1919 and 1928. He was captain between 1927 and 1928. He later became President of the Bath RFC from 1952 and 1954. His career culminated in his selection to play for the England rugby union team against Scotland in the Calcutta Cup, played on 18 March 1922; it proved to be his only international cap.

== Military service ==
During World War II Pitman served as a Squadron Leader in the Royal Air Force Volunteer Reserve. In May 1940, he was granted a commission for the duration of hostilities as Pilot Officer on probation. He was later promoted to Flying Officer.

== Corporate career ==
He joined his father Ernest Pitman and his uncle Alfred Pitman in the family business originally set up with his grandfather Sir Isaac Pitman. In around 1932, he became the chairman and managing director of Sir Isaac Pitman & Sons Ltd. Under his stewardship, the business became one of the world's leading educational publishers and training businesses with offices in London, Bath, New York City, Melbourne, Johannesburg, Toronto and Tokyo. The publishing business re-incorporated to Pitman Limited in 1975 then went public in 1983 before being purchased by rival Pearson Plc in 1985. The training business evolved into two separate businesses: Pitman Training and JHP Training (which re-branded to Learndirect).

Pitman also served on the board of directors of several large publicly limited companies including Boots the Chemists, Glaxo, Bovril and the Equity & Law Life Assurance Society.

== Educationalist ==
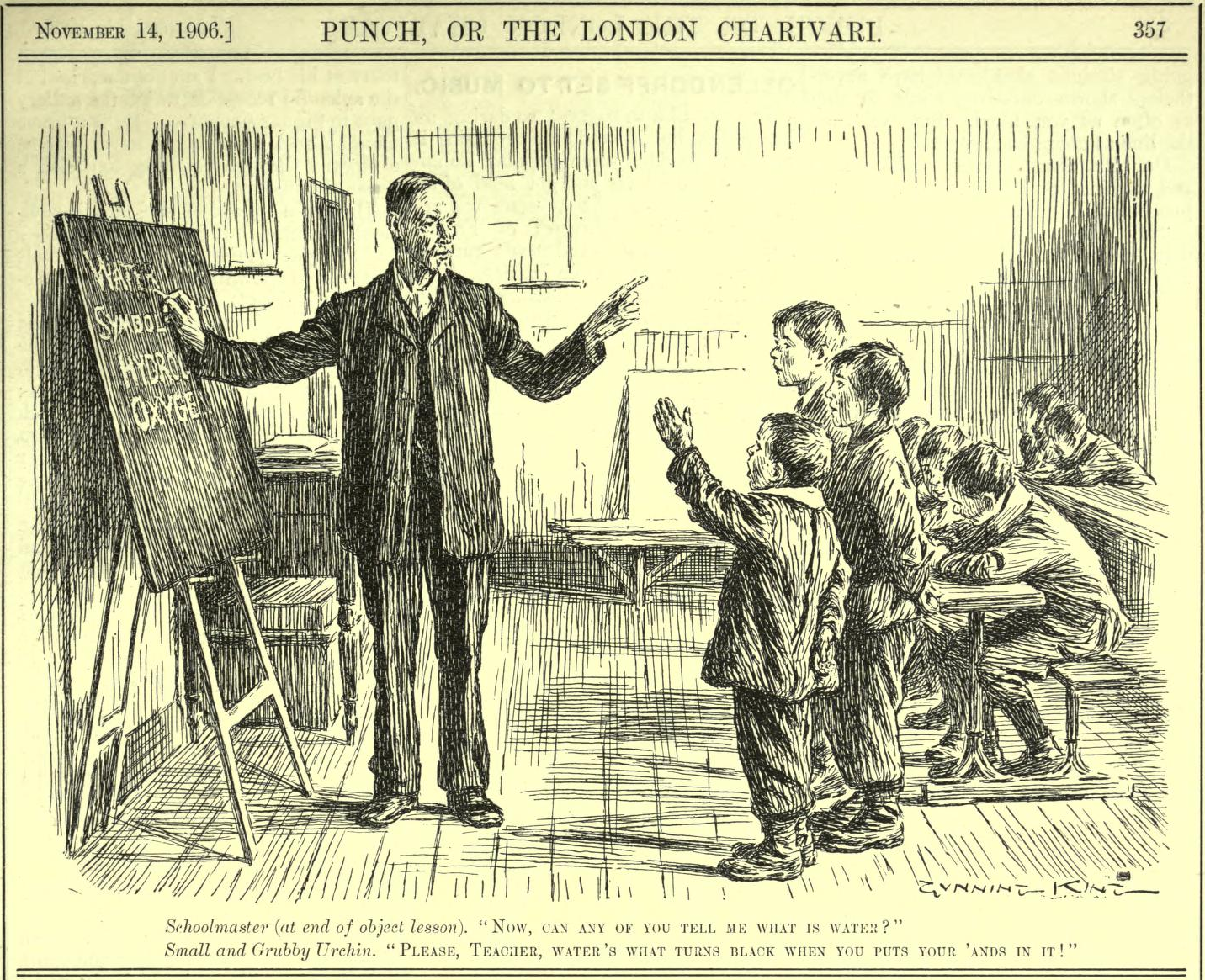
Pitman was a teacher and educationalist.

Pitman became an educationalist, promoting education from kindergarten children to adult training. His association with education started in the 1920s, when he served for a time as headmaster of one of the colleges in Maida Vale under the ownership of his family's business interests (Isaac Pitman & Sons Ltd).

Over his career, Pitman became one of the most prominent British educationalists, attaining leadership positions in many educational institutes:

- Chairman, Royal Society of Teachers
- Chairman of Council, National Centre for Cued Speech (for the deaf child)
- Vice-president of the British and Foreign School Society
- Member of the British Association for Commercial and Industrial Education (including the National Association for the Advancement of Education for Commerce)
- Chairman of the Joint Examining Board (between 1935 and 1950)
- Chairman, Treasurer & committee member of the Simplified Spelling Society
- Chairman of Council, the Initial Teaching Alphabet Foundation
- Life President of the UK Federation of i.t.a. Schools
- President of the Society of Commercial Teachers (between 1951 and 1955)
- Chairman of the management committee of the University of London, Institute of Education
- Pro-chancellor of the University of Bath between 1972 and 1981; as a result the Pitman papers reside with the university; the university awarded him an Honorary Degree (Doctor of Letters) in 1970

In his Who's Who listing, he put the greatest emphasis on his rank and file membership of the National Union of Teachers, which highlighted his progressive conservative tendencies with respect to educational matters.

== Public service ==
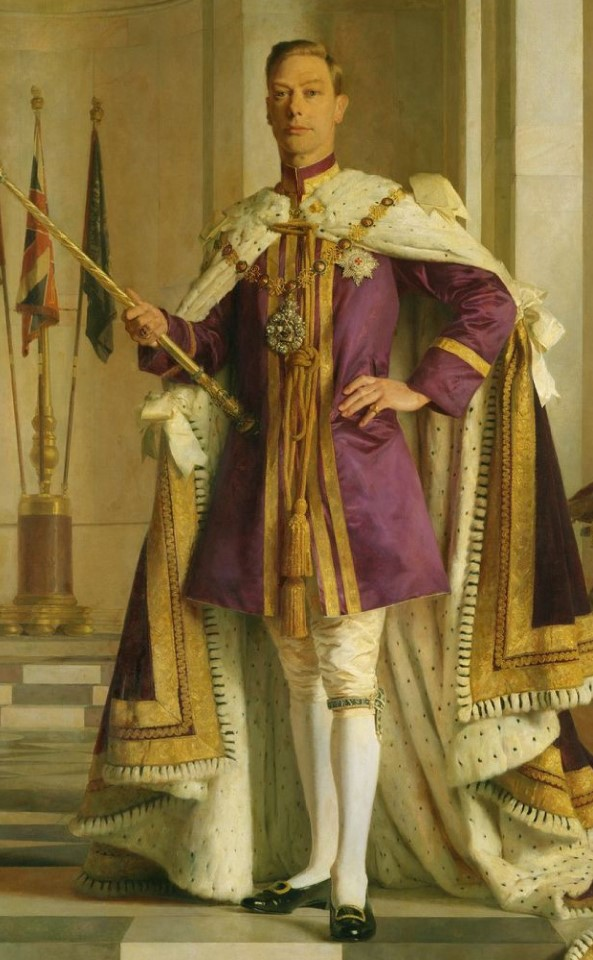
Pitman was the Bursar to the Duke of York's and King's Camp

Pitman had an extensive career as a public servant:

Pitman served as the Bursar of the Duke of York's and King's Camp 1933–1939.

Pitman served as a Director of the Bank of England during the war years of 1941-1945. As director of the Bank of England during the war, Pitman was on the board in 1946 which oversaw the nationalisation of the Bank of England by the new Labour administration. During the war, the Board also had to address the Nazi attempt to financially de-stabilise the United Kingdom through the injection into the British economy of banknotes forged at the Sachsenhausen concentration camp.

Pitman served as the first Director of Organization and Methods, a senior civil service post at HM Treasury 1943–1945.

Pitman served as vice-president of the Institute of Administrative Management for 1965–1969.

== Member of Parliament ==
At the 1945 general election, Pitman was elected to the House of Commons of the Parliament of the United Kingdom as Conservative Member of Parliament (MP) for the Borough of Bath, he was subsequently re-elected four times: - 1950, 1951, 1955, 1959 before finally retiring from Parliament just before the 1964 general election. As a member of parliament, he championed many notable causes, notably nationalisation, education, and world security.

=== Nationalisation ===
Pitman was first elected as a Conservative M.P. in the 1945 Labour party landslide win, after which he was involved in the opposition to the nationalisation programme of Clement Attlee's government. In particular, he debated extensively on the nationalisation of the Bank of England and the Gas Board, and wrote the influential pamphlet "Management efficiency in nationalized undertakings", in which he impartially analysed the issues of consumer rights and efficiency in the different models of nationalised industries tried by the Labour government.

=== Education ===
Pitman consistently used his position to petition for improvements to education and training and the funding thereof. As an example, his last contribution as an MP in 1964 was a written question asking for assurances against overcrowding in schools.

Pitman passionately argued in Parliament to make it easier for kindergarten-aged children to learn to read and write through orthographical and spelling reforms to the English Language. He worked with the similarly minded Labour MP, Mont Follick, to table a series of private members' bills to enable the reforms. The parliamentary support for these measures forced the government to allow a trial which led to the launch of the Initial Teaching Alphabet.

=== World Security ===
During Pitman's near two decade service as a M.P., there were a number of wars and coup d'états in various unstable regions of the world including the British Commonwealth. In response, ten parliamentarians including Pitman published a paper calling for a World Security Authority which would be a force to impose judgements from a world court to rule over cases of violation of international law.

== Honours ==
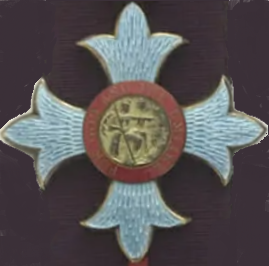
Badge of Knight Commander of British Empire 1917 - 1935

In 1961, Pitman was appointed as an Ordinary Knights Commander of the Civil Division of the said Most Excellent Order of the British Empire (KBE)

=== Grandfather's legacy ===
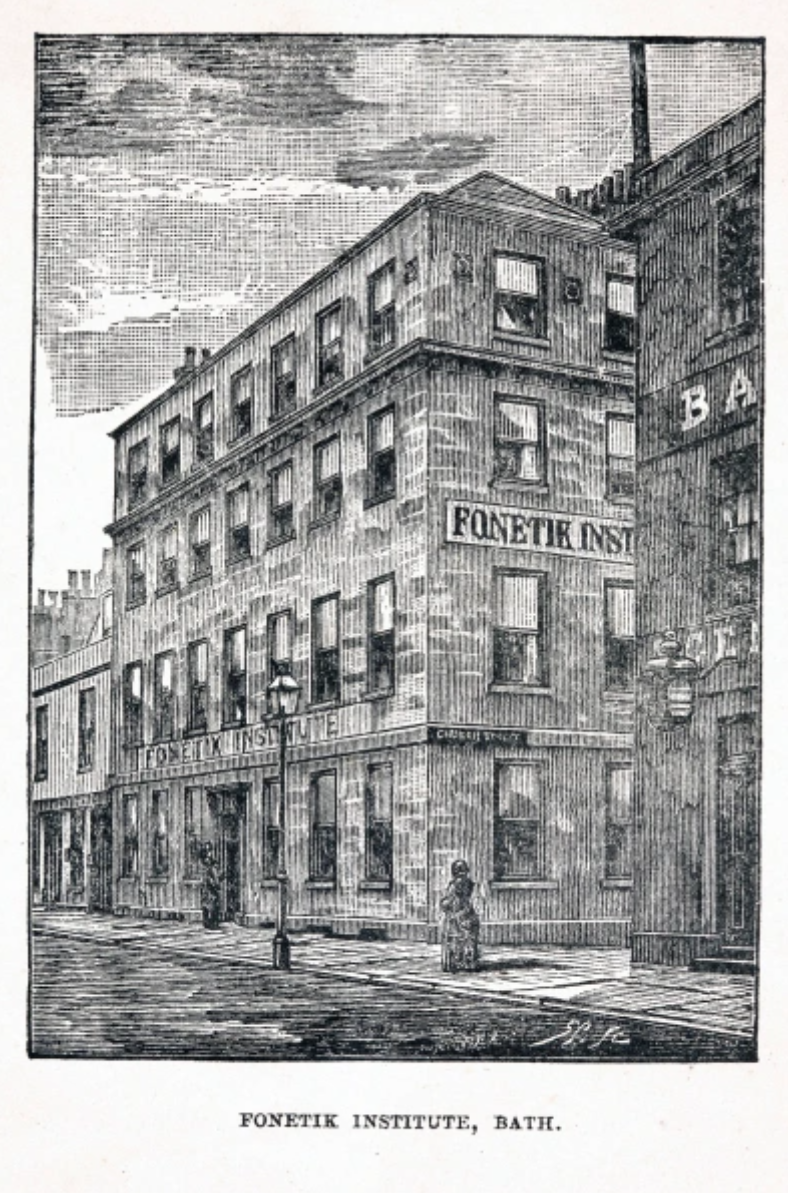
Building owned by Sir Isaac Pitman & Sons promoting Phonetics

Initially, Pitman inherited the ideas formulated by his grandfather, Isaac Pitman, who was a lifelong advocate of spelling reform for the English language. Isaac's major work on spelling reform was the development of the alternative English orthography known as Phonotypy which he published in 1844. Isaac's interest in orthography also led to his development of a form of phonetic shorthand which was known as Pitman shorthand, this eventually became the great source of wealth in the family and led to the formation of Sir Isaac Pitman & Sons, established 1886.

=== Alphabets and Reading ===
Consequently, Pitman obsessively studied the etymology of English orthography. He bemoaned the post-war government statistics showing that 30% of fifteen year-old who had passed through school education could barely read, and he argued that the irregularity of English phonology was the primary cause of the poor levels of literacy in the English speaking world. In 1969, he published his findings in Alphabets and Reading which was a collaboration with John Robert St. John, a professional writer.

=== Simplified Spelling Society ===
In May 1936, Pitman was elected to the committee of the Simplified Spelling Society after a fortuitous meeting on board a steam-ship in the mid-Atlantic between Pitman and committee member Lloyd James, Professor of Phonetics at the School of Oriental and African Studies, London University. Pitman reinvigorated the society by bringing both enthusiasm from his grandfather's phonetic legacy and the resources of Pitman and Sons. The first item of business was the publication of the book "New Spelling" which James considered "One of the most remarkable statistical investigations into English spelling ever undertaken". The publication costs were funded by Pitman, who became treasurer of the Society and was eventually elevated to the President in 1936.

=== Parliamentary pressure ===
In 1949 and 1953, as a member of parliament he used his position to agitate for orthographic reform through backing private members bills. He was part of a parliamentary group led by the Labour MP Mont Follick, who argued that orthographic reform to the English language was needed to improve levels of literacy and to make it easier for young children to learn to read and write. They successfully lobbied the education minister, Florence Horsbrugh, to allow a trial of an orthographic means of teaching children to read.

=== Initial Teaching Alphabet ===
Pitman then went on to develop the Initial Teaching Alphabet (ITA), which was first published in 1959 as The Ehrhardt Augmented (40-sound, 42-character) Lower Case Roman Alphabet. It was designed with the intention of simplifying the task of learning to read English. Pitman had to exploit the resources of his printing and publishing businesses and his extensive connections with the educational establishment to deploy his system.

The trial was considered successful, and the use of the ITA spread quickly through the UK and onwards to the English speaking world including the US, Canada, Australia and New Zealand. By 1968, the ITA federation of schools estimated that 4,000 schools in the U.K. and 17,000 schools worldwide used the alphabet. During this time, the alphabet was heavily studied by researchers and eventually the UK government asked Professor Frank Warburton and Vera Southgate to carry out an independent assessment of the research, which they published in 1969. Southgate polled 90 teachers on their preference for ITA or traditional orthography, and only two teachers preferred traditional orthography. One of these had come straight out of teacher training college to teach using ITA so had not experienced teaching children conventionally. Due to the technological limitations of the time, printed ITA books were expensive and teachers trained in using the alphabet were in short supply. Consequently, the ITA gradually became economically unviable, and fell into disuse in the 1980s despite its reported advantages.

=== George Bernard Shaw and the Shavian Alphabet ===
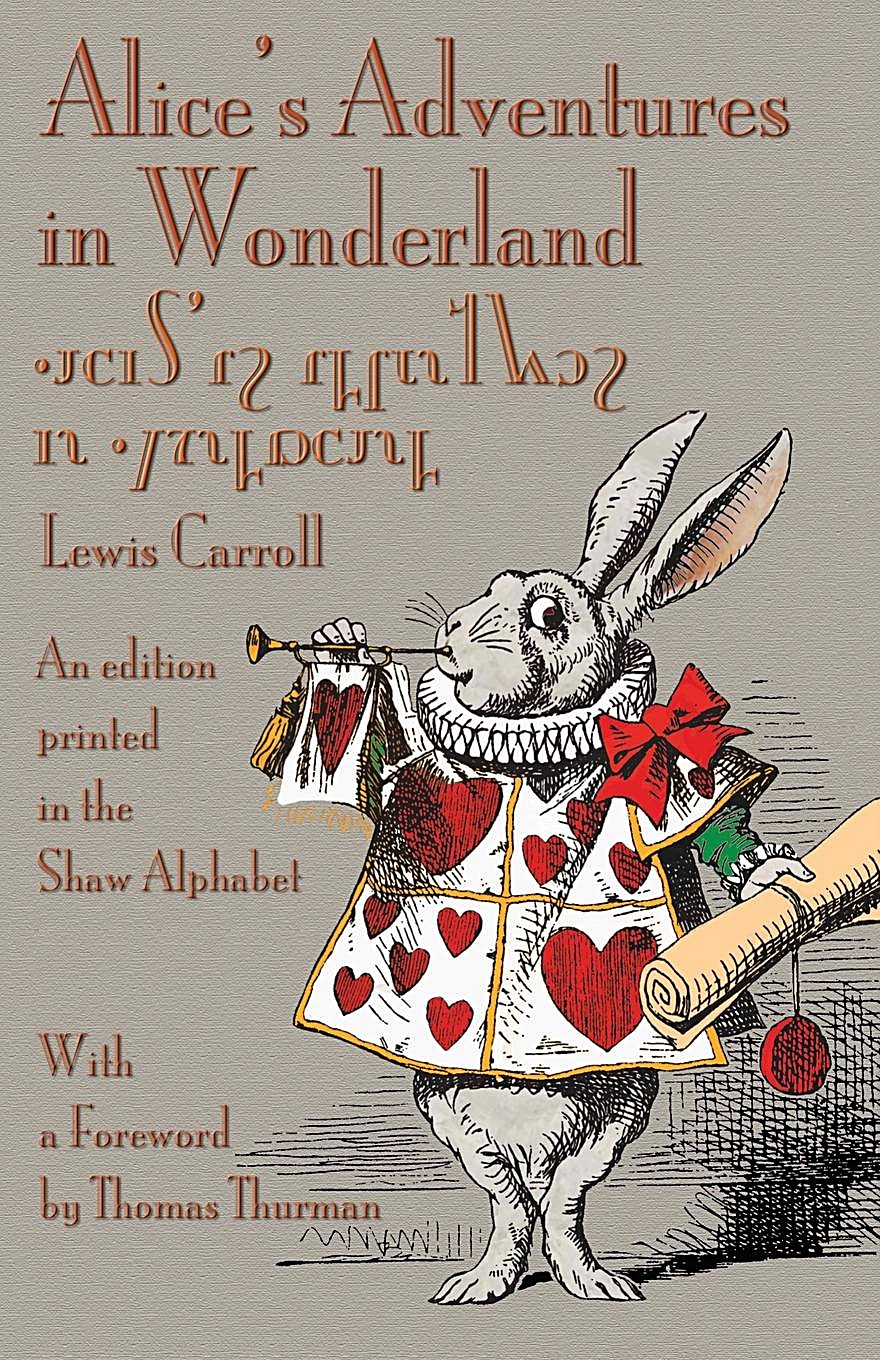
Shavian alphabet - Alice's Adventures in Wonderland - book cover

Another proponent of orthographic reform during that period was George Bernard Shaw, who, on his death in 1950, bequeathed a considerable portion of his estate, a sum of £8,300, towards the promotion of alphabetic reform. As a leading advocate of such reform, Sir James Pitman was invited to become a public trustee of Shaw's will, where his duties would include the administration and judging of a competition devised by Shaw to design an improved, more economical alphabet. This competition was won by Kingsley Read, who developed the Shavian alphabet, with most of Shaw's legacy spent demonstrating it through a special phonetic edition of Androcles and the Lion, published in 1962 by Penguin Books.

Parliament of the United Kingdom
Preceded by Thomas Loel Guinness	Member of Parliament for Bath; 1945–1964	Succeeded by Sir Edward Brown
