= Literacy (journal) =

- Discipline: Linguistics, education
- Language: English
- Edited by: Cathy Burnett, Julia Davies

Publication details
- Former name(s): Reading
- History: 1967-present
- Publisher: Wiley-Blackwell on behalf of the United Kingdom Literacy Association.
- Frequency: Triannually
- Impact factor: 0.400 (2011)

Standard abbreviations
- ISO 4: Literacy

Indexing
- ISSN: 1741-4350 (print); 1741-4369 (web)
- LCCN: 2004698500
- OCLC no.: 474780288

Links
- Journal homepage; Online access; Online archive

Literacy is a peer-reviewed academic journal published thrice annually by Wiley-Blackwell on behalf of the United Kingdom Literacy Association. The journal was established in 1967 as Reading and obtained its current name in 2004. It covers research on the study and development of literacy, including topics such as phonics, phonology, morphology, and language. The editors-in-chief are Natalia Kucirkova (University of Stavanger) and Diane Collier (Brock University).

According to the Journal Citation Reports, the journal has a 2011 impact factor of 0.400, ranking it 91st out of 162 journals in the category "Linguistics" and 150th out of 206 journals in the category "Education & Educational Research".
