= English orthography =

Norms for writing the English language

English orthography comprises the set of rules used when writing the English language, allowing readers and writers to associate written graphemes with the sounds of spoken English, as well as other features of the language. English's orthography includes norms for spelling, hyphenation, capitalisation, word breaks, emphasis, and punctuation.

As with the orthographies of most other world languages, written English is broadly standardised. This standardisation began to develop when movable type spread to England in the late 15th century. However, unlike with most languages, there are multiple ways to spell every phoneme, and most letters also represent multiple pronunciations depending on their position in a word and the context.

This is partly due to the large number of words that have been loaned from other languages throughout the history of English, without successful attempts at complete spelling reforms, and partly due to accidents of history, such as some of the earliest mass-produced English publications being typeset by highly trained, multilingual printing compositors, who occasionally used a spelling pattern more typical for another language. For example, the word ghost was spelled gost in Middle English, until the Flemish spelling pattern was unintentionally substituted, and happened to be accepted. Most of the spelling conventions in Modern English were derived from the phonemic spelling of a variety of Middle English, and generally do not reflect the sound changes that have occurred since the late 15th century (such as the Great Vowel Shift).

Despite the various English dialects spoken from country to country and within different regions of the same country, there are only slight regional variations in English orthography, the two most recognised variations being British and American spelling, and its overall uniformity helps facilitate international communication. On the other hand, it also adds to the discrepancy between the way English is written and spoken in any given location.

== Function of letters ==
=== Phonemic representation ===
Letters in English orthography positioned at one location within a specific word usually represent a particular phoneme. For example, at /ˈæt/ consists of 2 letters ⟨a⟩ and ⟨t⟩, which represent /æ/ and /t/, respectively.

Sequences of letters may perform this role as well as single letters. Thus, in thrash /θræʃ/, the digraph ⟨th⟩ (two letters) represents /θ/, and the digraph ⟨sh⟩ represents /ʃ/. In hatch /hætʃ/, the trigraph ⟨tch⟩ represents /tʃ/.

Less commonly, a single letter can represent multiple successive sounds. The most common example is the letter ⟨x⟩, which normally represents the consonant cluster /ks/ (for example, in tax /tæks/).

The same letter (or sequence of letters) may be pronounced differently when occurring in different positions within a word. For instance, ⟨gh⟩ represents /f/ at the end of some words (tough /tʌf/) but not in others (plough /plaʊ/). At the beginning of syllables, ⟨gh⟩ is pronounced /ɡ/, as in ghost /ɡoʊst/. Conversely, ⟨gh⟩ is never pronounced /f/ in syllable onsets other than in inflected forms, and is almost never pronounced /ɡ/ in syllable codas (the proper name Pittsburgh is an exception).

Some words contain silent letters, which do not represent any sound in modern English pronunciation. Examples include the ⟨l⟩ in talk, half, calf, etc., the ⟨w⟩ in two and sword, ⟨gh⟩ as mentioned above in numerous words such as though, daughter, night, brought, and the commonly encountered silent ⟨e⟩ (discussed further below).

=== Word origin ===
Another type of spelling characteristic is related to word origin. For example, when representing a vowel, ⟨y⟩ represents the sound /ɪ/ in some words borrowed from Greek (reflecting an original upsilon), whereas the letter usually representing this sound in non-Greek words is the letter ⟨i⟩. Thus, myth /ˈmɪθ/ is of Greek origin, while pith /ˈpɪθ/ is a Germanic word. However, a large number of Germanic words have ⟨y⟩ in word-final position, especially when deriving from an Old English -iġ (modern -y).

Some other examples are ⟨ph⟩ pronounced /f/ (which is most commonly ⟨f⟩), and ⟨ch⟩ pronounced /k/ (which is most commonly ⟨c⟩ or ⟨k⟩). The use of these spellings for these sounds often marks words that have been borrowed from Greek.

Some researchers, such as Brengelman (1970), have suggested that, in addition to this marking of word origin, these spellings indicate a more formal level of style or register in a given text, although Rollings (2004) finds this point to be exaggerated as there would be many exceptions where a word with one of these spellings, such as ⟨ph⟩ for /f/ (like telephone), could occur in an informal text.

=== Homophone differentiation ===
Spelling may also be useful to distinguish in written language between homophones (words with the same pronunciation but different meanings), and thus resolve potential ambiguities that would arise otherwise. However in most cases the reason for the difference is historical, and it was not introduced to resolve ambiguity.

Examples

- heir and air are pronounced identically in most dialects, but spelled differently.
- pain and pane are both pronounced /peɪn/ but have two different spellings of the vowel /eɪ/. This arose because the two words were originally pronounced differently: pain used to be pronounced as /peɪn/, with a diphthong, and pane as /peːn/, but the diphthong /eɪ/ merged with the long vowel /eː/ in pane, making pain and pane homophones (pane–pain merger). Later /eː/ became a diphthong /eɪ/.
- break and brake: (She's breaking the car vs. She's braking the car).

Nevertheless, many homophones remain that are unresolved by spelling (for example, the word bay has at least five fundamentally different meanings).

=== Marking sound changes in other letters ===
Some letters in English provide information about the pronunciation of other letters in the word. Rollings (2004) uses the term "markers" for such letters. Letters may mark different types of information.

⟨e⟩ often marks an altered pronunciation of a preceding vowel. In the pair mat and mate, the ⟨a⟩ of mat has the value /æ/, whereas the ⟨a⟩ of mate is marked by the ⟨e⟩ as having the value /eɪ/. In this context, the ⟨e⟩ is not pronounced, and is referred to as a "silent e".

Also, ⟨e⟩ in once /ˈwʌns/ indicates that the preceding ⟨c⟩ is pronounced /s/, rather than the more common value of ⟨c⟩ in word-final position as the sound /k/, such as in attic /ˈætɪk/.

A single letter may even fill multiple pronunciation-marking roles simultaneously. For example, in the word ace, ⟨e⟩ marks not only the change of ⟨a⟩ from /æ/ to /eɪ/, but also of ⟨c⟩ from /k/ to /s/. In the word vague, ⟨e⟩ marks the long ⟨a⟩ sound, but ⟨u⟩ keeps the ⟨g⟩ hard rather than soft.

Doubled consonants usually indicate that the preceding vowel is pronounced short. For example, the doubled ⟨t⟩ in batted indicates that the ⟨a⟩ is pronounced /æ/, while the single ⟨t⟩ of bated gives /eɪ/. Doubled consonants only indicate any lengthening or gemination of the consonant sound itself when they come from different morphemes, as with the ⟨nn⟩ in unnamed (un+named).

=== Multiple functionality ===
Any given letters may have dual functions. For example, ⟨u⟩ in statue has a sound-representing function (representing the sound /u/) and a pronunciation-marking function (marking the ⟨t⟩ as having the value /tʃ/ opposed to the value /t/).

=== Underlying representation ===
Like many other alphabetic orthographies, English spelling does not represent non-contrastive phonetic sounds (that is, minor differences in pronunciation which are not used to distinguish between different words).

Although the letter ⟨t⟩ is pronounced by most speakers with aspiration [tʰ] at the beginning of words, this is never indicated in the spelling, and, indeed, this phonetic detail is probably not noticeable to the average native speaker not trained in phonetics.

However, unlike some orthographies, English orthography often represents a very abstract underlying representation (or morphophonemic form) of English words.

[T]he postulated underlying forms are systematically related to the conventional orthography ... and are, as is well known, related to the underlying forms of a much earlier historical stage of the language. There has, in other words, been little change in lexical representation since Middle English, and, consequently, we would expect ... that lexical representation would differ very little from dialect to dialect in Modern English ... [and] that conventional orthography is probably fairly close to optimal for all modern English dialects, as well as for the attested dialects of the past several hundred years.

In these cases, a given morpheme (i.e., a component of a word) has a fixed spelling even though it is pronounced differently in different words. An example is the past tense suffix -⟨ed⟩, which may be pronounced variously as /t/, /d/, or /ᵻd/ (Note: The vowel of the suffixes -⟨ed⟩ and -⟨es⟩ may belong to the phoneme of either /ɪ/ or /ə/ depending on dialect, and ⟨ᵻ⟩ is a shorthand for "either /ɪ/ or /ə/". This usage of the symbol is borrowed from the Oxford English Dictionary.) (for example, pay /ˈpeɪ/, payed /ˈpeɪd/, hate /ˈheɪt/, hated /ˈheɪtɪd/). As it happens, these different pronunciations of -⟨ed⟩ can be predicted by a few phonological rules, but that is not the reason why its spelling is fixed.

Another example involves the vowel differences (with accompanying stress pattern changes) in several related words. For instance, photographer is derived from photograph by adding the derivational suffix -⟨er⟩. When this suffix is added, the vowel pronunciations change largely owing to the moveable stress:

Spelling	Pronunciation
photograph	/ˈfoʊtəɡræf/ or /ˈfoʊtəɡrɑːf/
photographer	/fəˈtɒɡrəfər/
photographical	/ˌfoʊtəˈɡræfɪkəl/

Other examples of this type are the -⟨ity⟩ suffix (as in agile vs. agility, acid vs. acidity, divine vs. divinity, sane vs. sanity). See also: Trisyllabic laxing.

Another example includes words like mean /ˈmiːn/ and meant /ˈmɛnt/, where ⟨ea⟩ is pronounced differently in the two related words. Thus, again, the orthography uses only a single spelling that corresponds to the single morphemic form rather than to the surface phonological form.

English orthography does not always provide an underlying representation; sometimes it provides an intermediate representation between the underlying form and the surface pronunciation. This is the case with the spelling of the regular plural morpheme, which is written as either -⟨s⟩ (as in tat, tats and hat, hats) or -⟨es⟩ (as in glass, glasses). Here, the spelling -⟨s⟩ is pronounced either /s/ or /z/ (depending on the environment, e.g., tats /ˈtæts/ and tails /ˈteɪlz/) while -⟨es⟩ is usually pronounced /ᵻz/ (e.g. classes /ˈklæsᵻz/). Thus, there are two different spellings that correspond to the single underlying representation |z| of the plural suffix and the three surface forms. The spelling indicates the insertion of /ᵻ/ before the /z/ in the spelling -⟨es⟩, but does not indicate the devoiced /s/ distinctly from the unaffected /z/ in the spelling -⟨s⟩.

The abstract representation of words as indicated by the orthography can be considered advantageous since it makes etymological relationships more apparent to English readers. This makes writing English more complex, but arguably makes reading English more efficient. However, very abstract underlying representations, such as that of Chomsky & Halle (1968) or of underspecification theories, are sometimes considered too abstract to accurately reflect the communicative competence of native speakers. Followers of these arguments believe the less abstract surface forms are more "psychologically real" and thus more useful in terms of pedagogy.

== Diacritics ==
Some English words can be written with diacritics; these are mostly loanwords, usually from French. As vocabulary becomes naturalised, there is an increasing tendency to omit the accent marks, even in formal writing. For example, rôle and hôtel originally had accents when they were borrowed into English, but now the accents are almost never used. The words were originally considered foreign—and some people considered that English alternatives were preferable—but today their foreign origin is largely forgotten. Words most likely to retain the accent are those atypical of English morphology and therefore still perceived as slightly foreign. For example, café and pâté both have a pronounced final ⟨e⟩, which would otherwise be silent under the normal English pronunciation rules. Moreover, in pâté, the acute accent is helpful to distinguish it from pate.

Further examples of words sometimes retaining diacritics when used in English are: ångström—partly because its symbol is ⟨Å⟩—appliqué, attaché, blasé, bric-à-brac, Brötchen, (Note: Included in Webster's Third New International Dictionary, 1981) cliché, crème, crêpe, fiancé(e), flambé, jalapeño, naïve, naïveté, né(e), papier-mâché, passé, piñata, protégé, résumé, risqué, and voilà. Italics, with appropriate accents, are generally applied to foreign terms that are uncommonly used in or have not been assimilated into English: for example, adiós, belles-lettres, crème brûlée, pièce de résistance, raison d'être, and vis-à-vis.

It was formerly common in American English to use a diaeresis to indicate a hiatus, e.g. coöperate, daïs, and reëlect. The New Yorker and Technology Review magazines still use it for this purpose, even as general use became much rarer. Instead, modern orthography generally prefers no mark (cooperate) or a hyphen (co-operate) for a hiatus between two morphemes in a compound word. By contrast, use of diaereses in monomorphemic loanwords such as naïve and Noël remains relatively common.

In poetry and performance arts, accent marks are occasionally used to indicate typically unstressed syllables that should be stressed when read for dramatic or prosodic effect. This is frequently seen with the -ed suffix in archaic and pseudoarchaic writing, e.g. cursèd indicates the ⟨e⟩ should be fully pronounced. The grave being to indicate that an ordinarily silent or elided syllable is pronounced (warnèd, parlìament).

== Ligatures ==
In certain older texts (typically British), the use of the ligatures ⟨æ⟩ and ⟨œ⟩ is common in words such as archæology, diarrhœa, and encyclopædia, all of Latin or Greek origin. Nowadays, the ligatures have been generally replaced by the digraphs ⟨ae⟩ and ⟨oe⟩ (encyclopaedia, diarrhoea) in British English or just ⟨e⟩ (encyclopedia, diarrhea) in American English, though both spell some words with only ⟨e⟩ (economy, ecology) and others with ⟨ae⟩ and ⟨oe⟩ (paean, amoeba, oedipal, Caesar). In some cases, usage may vary; for instance, both encyclopedia and encyclopaedia are current in the UK.

== Phonic irregularities ==
Partly because English has never had any official regulating authority for spelling, such as the Spanish Real Academia Española, the French Académie française, the German Council for German Orthography, the Danish Sprognævn, and the Thai Royal Society, English spelling is considered irregular and complex compared to that of other languages. Although French, Danish, and Thai, among other languages, present a similar degree of difficulty when encoding (writing), English is more difficult when decoding (reading), as there are clearly many more possible pronunciations of a group of letters. For example, in French, /u/ (as in "true", but short), can be spelled ⟨ou, ous, out, oux⟩ (ou, nous, tout, choux), but the pronunciation of each of those sequences is always the same. However, in English, while /uː/ can be spelled in up to 24 different ways, including ⟨oo, u, ui, ue, o, oe, ou, ough, ew⟩ (spook, truth, suit, blues, to, shoe, group, through, crew) (see Sound-to-spelling correspondences below), all of these spellings have other pronunciations as well (e.g., foot, us, build, bluest, so, toe, grout, plough, sew). Thus, in unfamiliar words and proper nouns, the pronunciation of some sequences, ⟨ough⟩ being the prime example, is unpredictable even for educated native speakers.

== Spelling irregularities ==
Attempts to regularize or reform the spelling of English have usually failed. However, Noah Webster promoted more phonetic spellings in the United States, such as flavor for British flavour, fiber for fibre, defense for defence, analyze for analyse, catalog for catalogue, and so forth. These spellings already existed as alternatives, but Webster's dictionaries helped standardize them in the United States. (See American and British English spelling differences for details.)

Besides the quirks the English spelling system has inherited from its past, there are other irregularities in spelling that make it tricky to learn. English contains, depending on dialect, 24–27 consonant phonemes and 13–20 vowels. However, there are only 26 letters in the modern English alphabet, so there is not a one-to-one correspondence between letters and sounds. Many sounds are spelled using different letters or multiple letters, and for those words whose pronunciation is predictable from the spelling, the sounds denoted by the letters depend on the surrounding letters. For example, ⟨th⟩ represents two different sounds (the voiced and voiceless dental fricatives) (see Pronunciation of English th), and the voiceless alveolar sibilant can be represented by ⟨s⟩ or ⟨c⟩.

It is, however, not (solely) the shortage of letters which makes English spelling irregular. Its irregularities are caused mainly by the use of many different spellings for some of its sounds, such as /uː/, /iː/ and /oʊ/ (too, true, shoe, flew, through; sleeve, leave, even, seize, siege; stole, coal, bowl, roll, old, mould), and the use of identical sequences for spelling different sounds (over, oven, move).

Furthermore, English no longer makes any attempt to anglicise the spellings of loanwords, but preserves the foreign spellings, even when they do not follow English spelling conventions like the Polish ⟨cz⟩ in Czech (rather than *Check) or the Norwegian ⟨fj⟩ in fjord (although fiord was formerly the most common spelling). In early Middle English, until roughly 1400, most imports from French were respelled according to English rules (e.g. bataille–battle, bouton–button, but not double, or trouble). Instead of loans being respelled to conform to English spelling standards, sometimes the pronunciation changes as a result of pressure from the spelling, e.g. ski, adopted from Norwegian in the mid-18th century. It used to be pronounced /ʃiː/, similar to the Norwegian pronunciation, but the increasing popularity of the sport after the mid-20th century helped the /skiː/ pronunciation replace it.

There was also a period when the spelling of a small number of words was altered to make them conform to their perceived etymological origins. For example, ⟨b⟩ was added to debt (originally dette) to link it to the Latin debitum, and ⟨s⟩ in island to link it to Latin insula instead of its true origin, the Old English word īġland. ⟨p⟩ in ptarmigan has no etymological justification whatsoever, only seeking to show Greek origin despite being a Gaelic word.

The spelling of English continues to evolve. Many loanwords come from languages where the pronunciation of vowels corresponds to the way they were pronounced in Old English, which is similar to the Italian or Spanish pronunciation of the vowels, and is the value the vowel symbols ⟨a, e, i, o, u⟩ have in the International Phonetic Alphabet. As a result, there is a somewhat regular system of pronouncing "foreign" words in English, and some borrowed words have had their spelling changed to conform to this system. For example, Hindu used to be spelled Hindoo, and the name Maria used to be pronounced like the name Mariah, but was changed to conform to this system. This only further complicates the spelling, however. On the one hand, words that retained anglicised spellings may be misread in a hyperforeign way. On the other hand, words that are respelled in a 'foreign' way may be misread as if they are English words, e.g. Muslim was formerly spelled Mooslim because of its original pronunciation.

Commercial advertisers have also had an effect on English spelling. They introduced new or simplified spellings like lite instead of light, thru instead of through, and rucsac instead of rucksack. The spellings of personal names have also been a source of spelling innovations: diminutive versions of women's names that sound the same as men's names have been spelled differently: Nikki and Nicky, Toni and Tony, Jo and Joe. The differentiation in between names that are spelled differently but have the same phonetic sound may come from modernisation or different countries of origin. For example, Isabelle and Isabel sound the same but are spelled differently; these versions are from France and Spain respectively.

As an example of the irregular nature of English spelling, ⟨ou⟩ can be pronounced (depending on vowel mergers) in as many as nine different ways: /aʊ/ in out, /oʊ/ in soul, /uː/ in soup, /ʌ/ in touch, /ʊ/ in could, /ɔː/ in four, /ɜː/ in journal, /ɒ/ in cough, and /ə/ in famous (See Spelling-to-sound correspondences). In the other direction, /iː/ can be spelled in at least 18~21 different ways: be (cede), ski (machine), bologna (GA), algae, quay, beach, bee, deceit, people, key, keyed, field (hygiene), amoeba, chamois (GA), dengue (GA), beguine, guyot, and ynambu (See Sound-to-spelling correspondences). (These examples assume a more-or-less standard non-regional British English accent. Other accents will vary.)

Sometimes everyday speakers of English change counterintuitive spellings, with the new spellings usually not judged to be entirely correct. However, such forms may gain acceptance if used enough. An example is the word miniscule, which still competes with its original spelling of minuscule, though this might also be because of analogy with the word mini.

=== ⟨ough⟩ words ===
The tetragraph ⟨ough⟩ can be pronounced in at least ten different ways, six of which are illustrated in the construct, Though the tough cough and hiccough plough him through, which is quoted by Robert A. Heinlein in The Door into Summer to illustrate the difficulties facing automated speech transcription and reading. Ough itself is a word, an exclamation of disgust similar to ugh, though rarely known or used. The following are typical pronunciations of this string of letters:

- /oʊ/ (as in so) in though and dough
- /ʌf/ (as in cuff) in tough, rough, enough, and the name Hough
- /ɒf/ (as in off) in trough, cough, and Gough
- /uː/ (as in blue) in through
- /ɔː/ (as in saw) in thought, ought, sought, nought, brought, etc.
- /ə/ (as in comma) in thorough, borough, and names ending in -borough; however, American English pronounces this as /oʊ/
- /aʊ/ (as in how) in bough, sough, drought, plough (plow in North America), doughty, and the names Slough and Doughty
- /ɒx/ (as in loch; mainly in words of Gaelic origin) in the word lough (an anglicised variant of loch used in Ireland) and in Irish place names, such as Ardclough, Glendalough, Loughmoe, Loughrea, etc.

The following pronunciations are found in uncommon single words:

- hough: /ɒk/ (more commonly spelled "hock" now)
- hiccough (a now-uncommon variant of hiccup): /ʌp/ as in up
- Oughterard (Irish place name): /uːx/

The place name Loughborough uses two different pronunciations of ⟨ough⟩: the first ⟨ough⟩ has the sound as in cuff and the second rhymes with thorough.

== Spelling-to-sound correspondences ==
Notes:

- In the tables, the hyphen has two different meanings. A hyphen after the letter indicates that it must be at the beginning of a syllable, e.g., ⟨j⟩- in jumper and ajar. A hyphen before the letter indicates that it cannot be at the beginning of a word, e.g., -⟨ck⟩ in sick and ticket.
- More specific rules take precedence over more general ones, e.g., "⟨c⟩- before ⟨e, i, y⟩" takes precedence over "⟨c⟩".
- Where the letter combination is described as "word-final", inflectional suffixes may be added without changing the pronunciation, e.g., catalogues.
- The dialects used are Received Pronunciation and General American. When pronunciations differ idiosyncratically, a pronunciation that only applies to one of the dialects is noted as being (RP) or (GA). When pronunciations differ systematically in a way that is not accounted for by the diaphonemic transcription system (i.e. the trap-bath and lot-cloth splits), the pronunciations in both dialects are given.
- Isolated foreign borrowings are excluded.
- ∅ means the letter is silent

=== Consonants ===
Spelling		Major value (IPA)	Examples of major value	Other values	Examples of other values
b, bb		/b/	bit, ebb, limber, bombe, obtain, blood, bring	∅	comb, bdellium, debtor, doubt
c	before ⟨e, i, y, ae⟩	/s/	cellar, city, cyst, face, prince, nicer, caesium	/tʃ/	cello, vermicelli
c	before ⟨e, i, y, ae⟩	/s/	cellar, city, cyst, face, prince, nicer, caesium	/ʃ/	liquorice
c	before ⟨e, i, y, ae⟩	/s/	cellar, city, cyst, face, prince, nicer, caesium	/k/	Celts, chicer, syncing
c	before ⟨e, i, y, ae⟩	/s/	cellar, city, cyst, face, prince, nicer, caesium	/ts/	letovicite
c	word initial before ⟨n, t⟩	∅	cnidarian, ctenoid		
c	before unstressed ⟨ea, ia, ie, io⟩	/ʃ/	ocean, special, glacier, concion	/ʒ/	coercion
c	elsewhere	/k/	cat, cross, predict, opuscule, picture	/s/	facade, muscle
c	elsewhere	/k/	cat, cross, predict, opuscule, picture	∅	victual, indict, blancmange
cc	before ⟨e, i, y⟩	/ks/	accept, eccentric, occidental	/k/	soccer, recce, siccing
cc	before ⟨e, i, y⟩	/ks/	accept, eccentric, occidental	/tʃ/	bocce, breccia, cappuccino
cc	before ⟨e, i, y⟩	/ks/	accept, eccentric, occidental	/s/	flaccid
cc	elsewhere	/k/	account, accrue, occur, yucca		
ch	after ⟨n⟩	/tʃ/	branch, franchise, enchant, enchilada, chinchilla	/k/	inchoate, synchronise, elasmobranch
ch	after ⟨n⟩	/tʃ/	branch, franchise, enchant, enchilada, chinchilla	/ʃ/	penchant, trenchant
ch	after ⟨n⟩	/tʃ/	branch, franchise, enchant, enchilada, chinchilla	/(t)ʃ/	truncheon
ch	in words of Greek origin	/k/	chasm, chimera, chord, lichen	∅	drachm
ch	in words of Modern French origin	/ʃ/	chaise, machine, cached, parachute	/k/	chemist, choir, machination
ch	in words of Modern French origin	/ʃ/	chaise, machine, cached, parachute	/tʃ/	chassis (GA), cheque, chowder, niche (GA)
ch	elsewhere	/tʃ/	chase, chin, attached, chore	/k/	ache, anchor, leprechaun
ch	elsewhere	/tʃ/	chase, chin, attached, chore	/ʃ/	machete, pistachio, welch
ch	elsewhere	/tʃ/	chase, chin, attached, chore	/h/	chutzpah (also with /x/)
ch	elsewhere	/tʃ/	chase, chin, attached, chore	/dʒ/	sandwich, Greenwich
ch	elsewhere	/tʃ/	chase, chin, attached, chore	/x/	loch (Scottish English)
ch	elsewhere	/tʃ/	chase, chin, attached, chore	∅	yacht, Crichton
ck		/k/	tack, ticket	∅	blackguard
d, dd, dh	before /uː/	/dʒ/	graduate, gradual (both also /dj/ in conservative RP)	/d/	doom
d, dd, dh	⟨-ed⟩ after a fortis sound	/t/	ached, creased, iced, puffed, raked		
d, dd, dh	elsewhere	/d/	dive, ladder, jodhpurs		
d, dd, dh	elsewhere	/d/	dive, ladder, jodhpurs	/ð/	gorsedd, edh
d, dd, dh	elsewhere	/d/	dive, ladder, jodhpurs	/dʒ/	soldier
d, dd, dh	elsewhere	/d/	dive, ladder, jodhpurs	∅	Wednesday, handsome, sandwich, ceilidh
dg	before ⟨e, i, y⟩ or a suffix	/dʒ/	lodger, pidgin, edgy, abridgment, acknowledgment, judgment, lodgment, fledgling		
dg	resulting from a compound word	/dɡ/	headgear, Edgar		
f, ff		/f/	fine, off, affinity	/v/	of
g	before ⟨e, i, y, ae⟩	/dʒ/	gel, pager, algae (GA), gin, gentle, rage, gigantic, regimen, geography	/ɡ/	get, eager, algae (RP), gig, give, girl
g	before ⟨e, i, y, ae⟩	/dʒ/	gel, pager, algae (GA), gin, gentle, rage, gigantic, regimen, geography	/ʒ/	genre, barrage, gigue, regime
g	before ⟨m⟩	∅	phlegmy, diaphragm	/ɡ/	pigmy
g	before ⟨m⟩	∅	phlegmy, diaphragm	/ʒ/	judgment
g	elsewhere	/ɡ/	go, great, leg, margaric	/dʒ/	margarine, gaol
g	elsewhere	/ɡ/	go, great, leg, margaric	/x/	witgat
gg	before ⟨e⟩	/ɡ/	dagger, smuggest, staggering	/ɡdʒ/	suggest (GA) (Note: According to the Longman Pronunciation Dictionary, 77% of Americans pronounce "suggest" as /səɡˈdʒɛst/.)
gg	before ⟨e⟩	/dʒ/	agger, exaggerate, suggest (RP)	/ɡdʒ/	suggest (GA)
gg	elsewhere	/ɡ/	giggle, egg, ziggurat, beggar	/dʒ/	arpeggio, veggies
gh	word or syllable-initial	/ɡ/	ghost, ghastly, ghetto, spaghetti, aghast		
gh	elsewhere	∅	daughter, through, fraught, brougham eight, higher, straight, sighed	/ə/ /oʊ/	burgh
gh	elsewhere	∅	daughter, through, fraught, brougham eight, higher, straight, sighed	/x/ /k/	lough, saugh
gh	elsewhere	∅	daughter, through, fraught, brougham eight, higher, straight, sighed	/k/	hough
gh	elsewhere	∅	daughter, through, fraught, brougham eight, higher, straight, sighed	/f/	laughter, trough, draught, rough
gh	elsewhere	∅	daughter, through, fraught, brougham eight, higher, straight, sighed	/ɡ/	yogh, burgher
gh	elsewhere	∅	daughter, through, fraught, brougham eight, higher, straight, sighed	/ɡh/	leghorn, pigheaded
gh	elsewhere	∅	daughter, through, fraught, brougham eight, higher, straight, sighed	/p/	hiccough
gn		/n/	gnome, signed, poignant, reign	/ɡn/ /nj/	signet, indignant lasagna
h	syllable-initial	/h/	honey, heist, house, manhandle doohickey, vehicular	/j/	posthumous (RP)
h	syllable-initial	/h/	honey, heist, house, manhandle doohickey, vehicular	/w/	Nahuatl
h	syllable-initial	/h/	honey, heist, house, manhandle doohickey, vehicular	∅	honest, heir, hours, piranha, annihilate, vehicle, dinghy, exhaust, herb (GA)
h	elsewhere	∅	oh, ohmic, cheetah, tahr	/tʃ/	sinh
j		/dʒ/	jump, ajar jonquil, Julian jalap, cajole bijugate	/j/	Hallelujah, fjord
j		/dʒ/	jump, ajar jonquil, Julian jalap, cajole bijugate	/ʒ/	jongleur, julienne, bijou
j		/dʒ/	jump, ajar jonquil, Julian jalap, cajole bijugate	/h/	jalapeno, fajita
j		/dʒ/	jump, ajar jonquil, Julian jalap, cajole bijugate	∅	marijuana
k, kk, kh		/k/	key, bake, trekking, sheikh, weeknight	∅	ktenology
kn		/n/	knee, knife, knock, beknave, camiknickers	/kn/	knish, Knoebel
l, ll		/l/	valve, balcony, almost, valley, flotilla, line, colony	∅	halve, balk, salmon
l, ll		/l/	valve, balcony, almost, valley, flotilla, line, colony	/j/	tortilla
l, ll		/l/	valve, balcony, almost, valley, flotilla, line, colony	/r/	colonel (in rhotic accents)
m, mm	word-initial before ⟨n⟩	∅	mnemonic		
m, mm	elsewhere	/m/	mine, hammer		
mb	morpheme-final	/m/	climber, numbing, bombed	/mb/	nimb
mb	elsewhere	/mb/	number, tumble		
n, nn	word-final after ⟨m⟩	∅	hymn, autumn, damningly		
n, nn	before /k, ɡ/	/ŋ/	inkling, bangle, anchor, minx	/n/	incline, vanguard, mankind
n, nn	elsewhere	/n/	nice, funny, enzyme monsignor, damnable, tin	/ŋ/	anxiety
n, nn	elsewhere	/n/	nice, funny, enzyme monsignor, damnable, tin	∅	monsieur
ng	before ⟨th, s⟩	/ŋ(k)/	strength, amongst, angst		
ng	morpheme-final	/ŋ/	long, tongue, kingly, singer, clingy	/ŋɡ/	longer, strongest
ng	word-initial	/əŋɡ/	ngana, ngultrum, Nguni	/n/	ngaio, Ngati
ng	otherwise	/ŋɡ/	congress, singly, finger, language	/nɡ/	congrats, engage, vanguard
ng	otherwise	/ndʒ/	binging, wharfinger, dingy, engaol, stingy	/ŋ/	hangar, lingonberry
ng	otherwise	/ndʒ/	binging, wharfinger, dingy, engaol, stingy	/nʒ/	ingenue, lingerie
p, pp	word-initial before ⟨n, s, t⟩	∅	pneumonia, psyche, ptomaine	/p/	psst
p, pp	elsewhere	/p/	pill, happy, soup, corpse, script	∅	coup, corps, receipt, raspberry
ph, pph		/f/	photograph, sapphire	/v/	Stephen
ph, pph		/f/	photograph, sapphire	/p/	shepherd
ph, pph		/f/	photograph, sapphire	/ph/	kniphofia, drophead
ph, pph		/f/	photograph, sapphire	∅	apophthegm
q	in words of Chinese origin	/tʃ/	qi, qigong, guqin		
q	elsewhere	/k/	Iraq, waqf, yaqona, mbaqanga, qiviut		
r, rr, rh, rrh	before a consonant; finally; before final ⟨e⟩	/r/, ∅ in non-rhotic	cart, hurt fir, walker, tear, burr, myrrh care	∅	sarsaparilla, forecastle, surprise (some GA)
r, rr, rh, rrh	elsewhere	/r/	ray, parrot, rhyme, diarrhoea	∅	iron, croissant (RP), hors d'oeuvre (some pronunciations)
See below for combinations of vowel letters and ⟨r⟩
s	word-final -⟨s⟩ morpheme after a fortis sound	/s/	pets, shops		
s	word-final -⟨s⟩ morpheme after a lenis sound	/z/	ines		
s	between vowels	/z/	phrases, prison, pleasing	/s/	bases, bison, leasing
s	between vowels	/z/	phrases, prison, pleasing	/ʒ/	vision, closure
s	elsewhere	/s/	song, ask, misled	/z/	is, lens, raspberry
s	elsewhere	/s/	song, ask, misled	/ʃ/	sugar, tension
s	elsewhere	/s/	song, ask, misled	∅	island, aisle, debris, mesne
sc	before ⟨e, i, y⟩	/s/	scene, scepter, scissors, scythe	/sk/	sceptic, scirrhus
sc	before ⟨e, i, y⟩	/s/	scene, scepter, scissors, scythe	/ʃ/	fascism
sc	before ⟨e, i, y⟩	/s/	scene, scepter, scissors, scythe	/z/	crescent (RP), discern
sch	in words of Middle or modern French origin	/ʃ/	schedule (RP), schist, eschalot	/sk/	eschar
sch	elsewhere	/sk/	school, scheme, schizoid, ischemia	/sk/ /s/ /ʃ/	schism (RP)
sch	elsewhere	/sk/	school, scheme, schizoid, ischemia	/s tʃ/	mischief, eschew
sh		/ʃ/	shin, fashion, wish, Lewisham, foreshore, kinship	/s h/	mishap, mishit
sh		/ʃ/	shin, fashion, wish, Lewisham, foreshore, kinship	/z h/	hogshead
sh		/ʃ/	shin, fashion, wish, Lewisham, foreshore, kinship	/s ʃ/	tranship
sh		/ʃ/	shin, fashion, wish, Lewisham, foreshore, kinship	/ʃ h/	threshold
sh		/ʃ/	shin, fashion, wish, Lewisham, foreshore, kinship	/s/	dishonour
ss	after a prefix ending ⟨-s⟩	/s s/	disseat, misspell, missort		
ss	elsewhere	/s/	boss, assign, narcissus dissert, posses, brassier, finesse, cesspool, missout	/ʃ/	tissue, passion
ss	elsewhere	/s/	boss, assign, narcissus dissert, posses, brassier, finesse, cesspool, missout	/ʒ/	rescission, scissure
ss	elsewhere	/s/	boss, assign, narcissus dissert, posses, brassier, finesse, cesspool, missout	/z/	dessert, possess, brassiere, scissor
sw		/sw/	swore, swan, swift	/s/	sword, answer
sw		/sw/	swore, swan, swift	/zw/	menswear
sw		/sw/	swore, swan, swift	∅	coxswain
t, tt	in -⟨sten, stle⟩	∅	hasten, listens, rustling, thistles	/t/	tungsten, listless
t, tt	elsewhere	/t/	ten, bitter, etiology, nastier, tune, piteous, cation, softer, wallet, gristmill, haste, dishearten	/ʃ/	ration, martial, cautious
t, tt	elsewhere	/t/	ten, bitter, etiology, nastier, tune, piteous, cation, softer, wallet, gristmill, haste, dishearten	/tʃ/	bastion, nature, fortune, righteous
t, tt	elsewhere	/t/	ten, bitter, etiology, nastier, tune, piteous, cation, softer, wallet, gristmill, haste, dishearten	/ʒ/	equation, transition (RP)
t, tt	elsewhere	/t/	ten, bitter, etiology, nastier, tune, piteous, cation, softer, wallet, gristmill, haste, dishearten	/d/	kindergarten (GA)
t, tt	elsewhere	/t/	ten, bitter, etiology, nastier, tune, piteous, cation, softer, wallet, gristmill, haste, dishearten	/θ/	tanh
t, tt	elsewhere	/t/	ten, bitter, etiology, nastier, tune, piteous, cation, softer, wallet, gristmill, haste, dishearten	∅	soften, ballet, Christmas, mortgage
tch	resulting from a compound word	/t tʃ/	shortchange		
tch	elsewhere	/tʃ/	batch, kitchen		
th		/θ/	thing, absinthe	/t/	thyme
th		/θ/	thing, absinthe	/tθ/	eighth
th		/ð/	this, bother, soothe	/th/	outhouse, potherb (RP)
th		/ð/	this, bother, soothe	/tʃ/	posthumous
th		/ð/	this, bother, soothe	∅	asthma
v, vv		/v/	vine, heavy, savvy, reveled, revved	/f/	verklempt
w	before ⟨r⟩	∅ (Note: /w/ in Scottish English.)	wrong, wrist, awry		
w	elsewhere	/w/	sward, swerve, wale	∅	two, sword, answer, gunwale
w	elsewhere	/w/	sward, swerve, wale	/v/	Weltanschauung, witgat
wh-	before ⟨o⟩	/h/	who, whole	/w/ (Note: Or /hw/ in Scottish English, Hiberno-English, Southern American English and, less commonly, other variations (including RP).)	whopping, whorl
wh-	elsewhere	/w/	wheel	/f/	whew (RP), whanau
x	word- or morpheme-initial	/z/	xylophone, xenon, axenic, chromoxylography	/ɪɡz/	Xavier
x	between word-initial ⟨e⟩ and a vowel	/ɡz/	example, exist, exotic, exult, existential, exultation, exit (Note: About half of both British and American speakers say /ˈɛksɪt/, the other half says /ˈɛɡzɪt/.)	/ks/	exabyte, execute, exoplanet
x	in words of Chinese or Mesoamerican origin	/ʃ/	sanxian, xiangqi, macpalxochitl, xoloitzcuintle	/ks/	axolotl
x	in words of Chinese or Mesoamerican origin	/ʃ/	sanxian, xiangqi, macpalxochitl, xoloitzcuintle	/z/	Xanadu
x	elsewhere	/ks/	boxes, mixes, expect, taxation, tuxedo, proximity, jinxed, next, six, taxi	/ɡz/	Alexander, anxiety, auxiliary
x	elsewhere	/ks/	boxes, mixes, expect, taxation, tuxedo, proximity, jinxed, next, six, taxi	/ɡʒ/	luxury (GA) (Note: Nearly 80% of Americans pronounce luxurious with /ɡʒ/, while two thirds of British people use /kʒ/. Half the American speakers pronounce luxury as /ˈlʌɡʒəri/, the rest says /ˈlʌkʃəri/.)
x	elsewhere	/ks/	boxes, mixes, expect, taxation, tuxedo, proximity, jinxed, next, six, taxi	/kʃ/	anxious, luxury (RP), sexual (GA) luxurious
x	elsewhere	/ks/	boxes, mixes, expect, taxation, tuxedo, proximity, jinxed, next, six, taxi	/z/	plateaux, chateaux
x	elsewhere	/ks/	boxes, mixes, expect, taxation, tuxedo, proximity, jinxed, next, six, taxi	∅	faux-pas, roux
x	elsewhere	/ks/	boxes, mixes, expect, taxation, tuxedo, proximity, jinxed, next, six, taxi	/h/	Oaxaca
xc	before ⟨e, i⟩	/ks/	excellent, except, excited		
xh		/ksh/	exhale, foxhole	/ks/	exhibition, Vauxhall
xh		/ksh/	exhale, foxhole	/ɡz/	exhaust, exhibit, exhilarating, exhortation
xh		/ksh/	exhale, foxhole	/ksj/, /ɡzj/	exhume
y		/j/	yes, young	/ð/	ye (mock archaic)
z, zz	after ⟨t⟩	/s/	waltz, ditzy, pretzel, tzatziki	/z/	tzar
z, zz	elsewhere	/z/	gazump, seized, crazier, rhizoophagous, pizzazz, zoo, quiz	/ʒ/	azure, seizure, brazier (GA)
z, zz	elsewhere	/z/	gazump, seized, crazier, rhizoophagous, pizzazz, zoo, quiz	/ts/	schizophrenic, pizzas
z, zz	elsewhere	/z/	gazump, seized, crazier, rhizoophagous, pizzazz, zoo, quiz	/dz/	jiaozi
z, zz	elsewhere	/z/	gazump, seized, crazier, rhizoophagous, pizzazz, zoo, quiz	∅	rendezvous

=== Vowels ===
In a generative approach to English spelling, Rollings (2004) identifies twenty main orthographic vowels of stressed syllables that are grouped into four main categories: "Lax" (similar to the "short" vowels taught in classrooms), "Tense" (the "long vowels"), "Heavy" (their correlated ⟨r⟩-colored vowel sound), and "Tense-R" (the second and third combined).

Letter	Lax (short)		Tense (long)		Heavy		Tense-R	
Letter	IPA	example	IPA	example	IPA	example	IPA	example
a	/æ/	mat	/eɪ/	mate	/ɑːr/	mar	/ɛər/	mare
e	/ɛ/	met	/iː/	mete	/ɜːr/	her	/ɪər/	here
i	/ɪ/	win	/aɪ/	wine	/ɜːr/	fir	/aɪər/	fire
o	/ɒ/	mop	/oʊ/	mope	/ɔːr/~/ɒːr/	for (Note: no distinction between heavy and tense-r ⟨o⟩ in most varieties of English (see horse–hoarse merger).)	/ɔːr/~/oər/	fore
u	/ʌ/	hug	/juː/	huge	/ɜːr/	cur	/jʊər/	cure
u	/ʊ/	push	/uː/	rude	(Note: ⟨u⟩ in the /ʊ, uː, ʊər/ pattern does not have a heavy vowel.)		/ʊər/	sure

Digraph	Lax		Tense		Heavy		Tense-R		From
Digraph	IPA	example	IPA	example	IPA	example	IPA	example	From
ai, ay	–		/eɪ/	bait	–		/ɛər/	air	/aj/
ai, ay	–		/eɪ/	essay	–		/ɛər/	Ayr	/aj/
au, aw	–		/ɔː/	audio	–		/ɔːr/	aura	/aw/
au, aw	–		/ɔː/	draw	–		/ɔːr/	rawr	/aw/
ea	/ɛ/	dreamt	/iː/	dream	/ɜːr/	heard	/ɪər/	hear	/ɛː/
ee	–		/iː/	see	–		/ɪər/	beer	/eː/
eu, ew	–		/juː/	feudal	–		/jʊər/	neurotic	/iw/
eu, ew	–		/juː/	few	–		/jʊər/	Newry	/iw/
oa	–		/oʊ/	boat	–		/ɔːr/	soar	/ɔː/
oo	/ʊ/	foot	/uː/	goose	–		/ʊər/	poor	/oː/
oo	–		–		–		/ɔːr/~/oər/	floor	/ɔː/
ou, ow	/ʌ/	southern	/aʊ/	south	/ɜːr/	scourge	/aʊər/	hour	/uː/
ou, ow	–		/aʊ/	now	–		/aʊər/	dowry	/uː/
ou, ow	–		/oʊ/	soul	–		/ɔːr/~/oər/	four	/ow/
ou, ow	/ɒ/	knowledge	/oʊ/	know	–		–		/ow/
oi, oy	–		/ɔɪ/	point	–		/ɔɪər/	coir	/oj/
oi, oy	–		/ɔɪ/	boy	–		/ɔɪər/	Moyra	/oj/

For instance, ⟨a⟩ can represent the lax vowel /æ/, tense /eɪ/, heavy /ɑː/, or tense-r /ɛə/. Heavy and tense-r vowels are the respective lax and tense counterparts followed by ⟨r⟩.

Tense vowels are distinguished from lax vowels with a "silent" ⟨e⟩ that is added at the end of words. Thus, ⟨a⟩ in hat is lax /æ/, but when ⟨e⟩ is added in the word hate ⟨a⟩ is tense /eɪ/. Heavy and tense-r vowels follow a similar pattern, e.g. ⟨ar⟩ in car is heavy /ɑːr/, ⟨ar⟩ followed by silent ⟨e⟩ in care is /ɛər/. ⟨u⟩ represents two different vowel patterns, one being /ʌ, juː, ɜː, jʊər/, the other /ʊ, uː, ʊər/. There is no distinction between heavy and tense-r ⟨o⟩, and ⟨u⟩ in the /ʊ, uː, ʊər/ pattern does not have a heavy vowel.

Besides silent ⟨e⟩, another strategy for indicating tense and tense-r vowels is the addition of another orthographic vowel forming a digraph. In this case, the first vowel is usually the main vowel while the second vowel is the "marking" vowel. For example, man has a lax ⟨a⟩ (/æ/), but the addition of ⟨i⟩ (as the digraph ⟨ai⟩) in main marks the ⟨a⟩ as tense (/eɪ/). These two strategies produce words that are spelled differently but pronounced identically, which helps differentiate words that would otherwise be homonyms, as in mane (silent ⟨e⟩ strategy), main (digraph strategy) and Maine (both strategies).

Besides the 20 basic vowel spellings, Rollings (2004) has a reduced vowel category (representing the sounds /ə, ɪ/) and a miscellaneous category (representing the sounds /ɔɪ, aʊ, aɪ/ and /j/+V, /w/+V, V+V).

=== Combinations of vowel letters excluding those followed by ⟨r⟩ ===
To reduce dialectal difficulties, the sound values given here correspond to the conventions at Help:IPA/English. This table includes ⟨h, w, y⟩ when they represent vowel sounds. If no information is given, it is assumed that the vowel is in a stressed syllable.

Deriving the pronunciation of an English word from its spelling requires not only a careful knowledge of the rules given below (many of which are not explicitly known even by native speakers: speakers merely learn the spelling of a word along with its pronunciation) and their many exceptions, but also:

- a knowledge of which syllables are stressed and which are unstressed (not derivable from the spelling: compare hallow and allow)
- which combinations of vowels represent monosyllables and which represent disyllables (ditto: compare waive and naive, creature and creator)

The underscore (_) in a vowel-consonant-⟨e⟩ spelling is the place where the next spelling in a word goes in.

The pronunciation of vowel letters when followed by ⟨r⟩ is covered in a separate table below.

Spelling			Major value (IPA)	Examples of major value	Minor values	Examples of minor value	Exceptions
a	in closed syllables: before multiple consonants; final vowel in word		/æ/	hatchet, banner, tally acrobat, cat	/eɪ/	ancient, chamber, pastry, bass	/ɒ/ yacht, restaurant; /ɛ/ catch (GA); /ʌ/ apsaras; ∅ forecastle
a	in closed syllables: before multiple consonants; final vowel in word		/æ/	hatchet, banner, tally acrobat, cat	/ɑː/ (RP), /æ/ (GA)	aft, ask, dance, past	/ɒ/ yacht, restaurant; /ɛ/ catch (GA); /ʌ/ apsaras; ∅ forecastle
a	followed by 2+ unstressed syllables; next syllable contains /ɪ, ə/		/æ/	national, camera, reality acid, granite, palace	/eɪ/	nationhood, scathingly basis, aphasic	∅ sarsaparilla
a	in open syllables: before single consonant; before heterosyllabic vowel		/eɪ/	ache, opaque, savor, status table, hatred, April chaos, aorta, mosaic	/æ/	plaque, manor, statue macle, sacrifice, theatrical	/ɛ/ many, any /aɪ/ naive (also with /ɑː/) /ʌ/ sati
a	in open syllables: before single consonant; before heterosyllabic vowel		/eɪ/	ache, opaque, savor, status table, hatred, April chaos, aorta, mosaic	/ɑː/	debacle gala, lava, slalom, sonata	/ɛ/ many, any /aɪ/ naive (also with /ɑː/) /ʌ/ sati
a	before final -⟨nge, ste⟩		/eɪ/	range, exchange, haste	/æ/	flange, caste (GA)	
a	before final -⟨nge, ste⟩		/eɪ/	range, exchange, haste	/ɑː/	melange	
a	after /w/ except before /k, ɡ, ŋ/: closed syllables		/ɒ/	want, watch, swamp, swastika, wallet	/ɒ/ (RP), /ɔː/ (GA) /ɔː/ /eɪ/	squash, wasp, wash wall, walnut, walrus wastage	/ɑː/ qualm (also /ɔː/), suave, swami /æ/ swam, aquatic (RP) /ʌ/ was (GA), what (GA)
a	after /w/ except before /k, ɡ, ŋ/: open syllables		/eɪ/	persuade, swathe	/ɒ/ /ɔː/	quality water	/ɑː/ qualm (also /ɔː/), suave, swami /æ/ swam, aquatic (RP) /ʌ/ was (GA), what (GA)
a	word-final		/ɑː/	bra, cha-cha, schwa, spa			
a	unstressed	in -⟨ace, age, ase, ate⟩ (except verbs)	/ɪ, ə/	palace, damage, forage, garbage, pirate, private	/ɑː/ /ɪ/	RP: garage, barrage chocolate, purchase, solace	/eɪ/ rampage, primate
a	unstressed	elsewhere	/ə/	about, an, salary, woman, blancmange, opera, via	/ə/ to ∅ /eɪ/ /æ/ /ɑː/ (RP), /æ/ (GA)	artistically, ordinary, necessary probate, folate, kinase anorak, rectangle, abscond contrast (n), flabbergast, reprimand	/i/ karaoke, bologna (GA) /æ/ Assam /ʌ/ chaprassi
a_e			/eɪ/	gave, mate, flake	/æ/	have	/ɛ/ ate (RP)
aa, ah			/ɑː/	baa, naan, blah	/ə/	Isaac, bar mitzvah	/eɪ/ Quaalude, dahlia (also /ɑː/ or /æ/)
ae			/iː/	encyclopaedia, paediatrician, Caesar	/ɛ/	aesthetic	/eɪ/ reggae, sundae, Gael /ə/ Michael, polkaed /aɪ/ maestro /aɪ.ɛ/ paella /æ/ Scottish Gaelic
ai	stressed		/eɪ/	daisy, laid, paisley, regain, waif	/aɪ/ /ɛ/ /eɪ.ɪ/	aisle, bonsai, daimon, krait said, again, against dais, laic, mosaic, papain	/æ/ plaid, plaited, daiquiri /aɪˈiː/ naif, caique /i.ɪ/ archaism (RP)
ai	unstressed		/ɪ, ə/	bargain, mountain, portrait	/ə/	certain, coxswain, spritsail	
ao			/aʊ/	manoao, miaow, Maoism, cacao (GA)	/eɪ/ /eɪ.ɒ/ /eɪ.ə/ /iˈoʊ/ /ɑːoʊ/	gaol kaon, chaos kaolin karaoke baobab	
au			/ɔː/	cause, fraud, haul, sauce, slaughter	/ɒ/ /ɑː/ (RP), /æ/ (GA) /aʊ/ /oʊ/	because (RP), sausage (RP), leprechaun (GA) aunt, draught, laughter degauss, graupel, trauma (GA) chauffeur, gauche, mauve	/eɪ/ gauge /ʌ/ because (GA) /ə/ meerschaum ∅ restaurant
aw			/ɔː/	awed, flaw, hawk, tawny			/aʊ/ Mawlid
ay			/eɪ/	bayonet, essays, grayer, hayride	/aɪ/ /ɛ/	aye, bayou, kayak, papaya mayor, prayer, says	/iː/ cay, quay, parlay /əj/ gayal
e	in closed syllables: before multiple consonants; final vowel in word		/ɛ/	petty, lethargy, trebleget, watershed	/iː/	axes (plural of axis), lethal, reflex, Stephen, feces, legally	/ɪ/ pretty /ɒ/ ennui, entourage, genre /eɪ/ eh /ʌ/ feng shui
e	bef. 2+ unstressed syllables; next syllable contains /ɪ/		/ɛ/	legacy, elegant, delicate, metric, crevice, epic	/iː/	devious, premium, evil, scenic, strategic	/ɪ/ English
e	in open syllables: before single consonant; before cons. + ⟨r⟩ + vowel; final, only vowel in word; before heterosyllabic vowel		/iː/	even, demon, fetal, recombine metre, secret, egret, secretion be, she museum, neon, theater (GA)	/ɛ/	ever, lemon, petal, recollect petrol, debris (RP), discretion	/eɪ/ crepe, suede, ukulele /ɪ, ə/ repel, debris (some dialects)
e	in open syllables: before single consonant; before cons. + ⟨r⟩ + vowel; final, only vowel in word; before heterosyllabic vowel		/iː/	even, demon, fetal, recombine metre, secret, egret, secretion be, she museum, neon, theater (GA)	/eɪ/	seance, deity (some pronunciations)	/ɛ/ yeah (GA)
e	unstressed	word-final	∅	discipline, recites, smile, limitrophe	/iː/	recipes, simile, apostrophe, deled	/eɪ/ latte, mores, protege /ɛ/ zanze
e	unstressed	before heterosyllabic vowel	/i/	create, area, atheism, video	/eɪ/	fideism, realpolitik	
e	unstressed	elsewhere	/ɪ, ə/	market, ticket, honest, college, boxes, perfect, express, believe	/ə/	taken, decency, moment	/ɛ/ contest, alphabet, princess
ea	in closed syllables: before multiple consonants		/ɛ/	dreamt, cleanse, wealth	/iː/ /iə/	feast, yeast realty, fealty	/ɔː/ ealderman /æ/ poleax /eɪ.ɑː/ seance
ea	in open syllables: before single consonant; before cons. + ⟨r⟩ + vowel; final, only vowel in word; before heterosyllabic vowel		/iː/	read (infinitive), leaf, zeal, dreams, cleans	/ɛ/ /eɪ/ /ə/ /iːə, ɪər/ /ɪər/ /iːə/ /iː.eɪ/	read (past simple), deaf, zealot break, great, eagre, yea hydrangea, likeable, ocean ideal, real, cereal idea urea, laureate creating, protease, reagent	/ɑː/ orgeat /ɛə/ yeah (RP) /æ/ whereas /iːæ/ caveat /ɪ/ mileage /iː.ɪ/ lineage /iːæ/ beatify, reality /eɪˈɑː/ real
eau			/oʊ/	bureau, plateau, tableau	/juː/	beauty	/ɒ/ bureaucracy /ə/ bureaucrat
ee			/iː/	bee, breech, feed, trainee			/ɪ/ breeches, been (GA) /eɪ/ matinee, fiancees, nee /i/ bungee, coffee /iː.ə/ freest, weest /iː.ɛ/ reecho, /iː.ɪ/ reelect /ɛ/ threepence (also /ɪ/ or /ʌ/)
eh			/eɪ/	eh, prehnite, tempeh	/ɛər/	yeh	/ɛ/ feh /ə/, keffiyeh
ei, ey	usually		/eɪ/	veil, weight, heinous, obey	/iː/ /aɪ/ /iː.ɪ/	caffeine, seize, key, either geyser, height, heist, heinie, eye albeit, being, cysteine, deist	/ɛ/ heifer, leisure, seigneur /æ/ reveille, serein /eɪ.ɪ/ fideist, /iˈaɪ/ deice
ei, ey	after ⟨c⟩		/iː/	deceive, ceiling, conceit			/æ/ ceinture, enceinte /eɪ.ɪ/ glaceing, /iː.ɪ/ haecceity
ei, ey	unstressed	word-final	/i/ /iː/	monkey, volley, curtsey, jersey			/eɪ/ survey (n)
ei, ey	unstressed	elsewhere	/ɪ, ə/	foreign, counterfeit, forfeit	/ə/	mullein, villein	/ɪ/ ageist, herein, ogreish
eo	usually bisyllabic		/iː.ɒ/ /iː.oʊ/ /iːə/	eon, geology, reoffer, teleost creole, geode, leonine, video galleon, leotard, peon, theory	/ɛ/ /iː/ /ə/	feoffee, jeopardy, leopard feoff, people luncheon, pigeon, embraceor	/oʊ/ yeoman, /ɛər/ ceorl /juː/ feodary, /uːi/ geoduck /eɪoʊ/ rodeo, teosinte /ɒ/ thereon /ʌ/ whereof /wʌ/ someone
eu, ew (ieu, iew)	usually		/juː/	deuce, feudal, queue, dew, ewe, view	/ɜː/ /iːə/	berceuse, danseuse museum	/oʊ/ sew ∅ fauteuil
eu, ew (ieu, iew)	after /r, ʃ, ʒ, dʒˌl/ after /t, d, n/ (GA)		/uː/	rheumatism, sleuth, jewel, blew, leukemia, lewd, lieu	/iːə/	nucleus, pileus	/oʊ/ shew /ɛf/ lieutenant (RP)/jɜː/ milieu (RP) /iːˈjuː/ reuse /iː.ʌ/ reutters /ʌ/ pileup /ə/ whereupon /ɔɪ/ Freudian
i	in closed syllables: before multiple consonants; final vowel in worded		/ɪ/	dissent, mislaid, slither kiss, sic, bit, inflict, hint, plinth	/aɪ/	dissect, island, indict, pint, ninth	/æ/ meringue, timbre, absinthe (also /ɪ/) /iː/ artiste, chenille, skis, chic, ambergris
i	bef. 2+ unstressed syllables; next syllable contains /ɪ/; before cons. + ⟨e, i⟩ + vowel		/ɪ/	litany, liberal, chivalry, misery finish, limit, minute (n) hideous, position, Sirius	/aɪ/	blithely, irony, libelous, rivalry, miserly, whitish, writing, shinier, tidied	
i	in open syllables: before single consonant; before cons. + -⟨le⟩ or ⟨r⟩ + vowel; before -⟨gh, gn⟩; word final; before heterosyllabic vowel		/aɪ/	cited, dive, mica, rise, fire idle, trifle, nitrous, mitres sighed, signage alumni, alibi, radii vial, quiet, prior, pious	/ɪ/	city, give, vicar, risen triple, citrus, giblets pighead, signal	
i	in open syllables: before single consonant; before cons. + -⟨le⟩ or ⟨r⟩ + vowel; before -⟨gh, gn⟩; word final; before heterosyllabic vowel		/aɪ/	cited, dive, mica, rise, fire idle, trifle, nitrous, mitres sighed, signage alumni, alibi, radii vial, quiet, prior, pious	/iː/	ski, macaroni, litres, in vitro, chignon, Monsignor clientele, fiat, lien, skiing	
i	before -⟨nd, l⟩		/aɪ/	wilder, remind	/ɪ/	bewilder, rescind	
i	unstressed	before heterosyllabic vowel	/j/	onion, minion	/aɪ/	biology, diameter	∅ parliament, lieu, nostalgia /i/ liaison, alien, radii, idiot
i	unstressed	elsewhere	/ɪ, ə/	divide, permit (n), livid, typical	/ə/	giraffe, pencil, cousin, Cheshire	∅ business /aɪ/ director, minute (adj) /aɪər/ sapphire
i_e			/aɪ/	polite, shine	/iː/ /ɪ/	police, elite give, live (v)	
ie	word-finally		/aɪ/	belie, die, untie, vie	/i/	goalie, oldie, auntie, movie	/eɪ/ lingerie (GA), /ieɪ/ kyrie
ie	elsewhere		/iː/	field, siege, rabies, skied	/aɪ/ /aɪə/ /iə/ to /jə/ /iˈɛ/	allied, pied, skies client, diet, science, sliest ambient, alien, oriel, ugliest orient (v), acquiesce	/ɪ/ sieve, mischief, kerchief /ɛ/ friend, hygienic (GA) /aɪˈɛ/ biennial /aɪiː/ diene /iː.ɒ/ clientele /iˈiː/ medieval /iːə/ lien
o	in closed syllables: before multiple consonants; final vowel in word		/ɒ/	doctor, bother, donkey dot, bomb, wonk, font	/ʌ/ /oʊ/	won, monkey, front gross, comb, wonted, both	/uː/ tomb, womb /ʊ/ wolf /wʌ/ once /ɔː/ (GA) long, broth
o	bef. 2+ unstressed syllables; next syllable contains /ɪ/		/ɒ/	opera, colonise, botany topic, solid, promise	/oʊ/	brokenly, probity, diplomacy meiosis, aerobic	
o	in open syllables: before single consonant; before cons. + -⟨le⟩ or ⟨r⟩ + vowel; word-final; before heterosyllabic vowel (inc. unstressed)		/oʊ/	omen, total noble, cobra banjo, go boa, poet, stoic cooperate, proactive	/ɒ/ /uː/ /ʌ/	proper to, who, doable colander	/ʊ/ woman, bosom /ɪ/ women ∅ colonel, chocolate
o	unstressed		/ə/	eloquent, wanton, purpose, Europe			/ɒ/ neuron, proton /ɪ, ə/ hydrogen /u/ into
o_e			/oʊ/	nose, drove, hope, grove	/ʌ/	done, glove, come	/ɒ/ gone, shone (RP) /uː/ lose, move /wʌ/ one
oa			/oʊ/	boat, coal, load, coaxing	/oʊ.ə/ /oʊæ/ /oʊˈeɪ/	boa, inchoate coaxial, ogdoad oasis, cloaca	/ɔː/ broad /uːə/ doable /oʊˈɑː/ koala /wɑː/ quinoa
oe	usually		/iː/	amoeba, coelacanth, foetal, phoenix	/oʊ/ /uː/ /oʊˈɛ/	doeskin, woeful shoelace, canoeing poetic, soever, orthoepic	/ɛ/ foetid, roentgen /oʊˈiː/ coeval, noesis /oʊˈɜː/ coerce /oʊ.ə/ poetry, orthoepy
oe	last vowel in word		/oʊ/	foe, goes, toed, woe	/uː/ /oʊɛ/ /oʊ.ə/ /oʊ.ɪ, oʊ.ə/	shoes, canoe coed, noel, phloem goer loess, poem	/ʌ/ does /uːə/ doeth, doer /ɜː/ foehn /oʊiː/ diploe, kalanchoe
oe	unstressed		/ɪ/	oedema, oesophagus	/oʊ/	aloe, echoed, oboes, soloed	/uː/ hoopoe
oeu			/uː/	manoeuvre			/ɜːr/ hors d'oeuvre
oh	final or before a consonant		/oʊ/	oh, kohlrabi, ohm, pharaoh	/ɒ/	John, johnny	/ɔː/ bohrium /ə/ matzoh
oi			/ɔɪ/	boing, moist, coin, envoi	/oʊɪ/ /wɑː/ /ə/	going, egoist, heroin, stoic bourgeois, coiffeur, patois connoisseur, porpoise, tortoise	/uːɪ/ doing /wæ/ croissant (RP) /i/ chamois /oʊaɪ/ ghettoise, oroide
oo	usually		/uː/	cool, sooth, boot, goosebumps	/ʊ/	wool, soot, foot, gooseberry	/oʊ/ brooch /oʊ.ɒ/ coopt, zoology, /oʊ.ə/ oocyte (RP)
oo	before ⟨k, d⟩		/ʊ/	cook, shook, wood, stood	/uː/	kook, spook, food, brood	/ʌ/ flood, blood
ou	before single consonant; before cons. + -⟨le⟩ or ⟨r⟩ + vowel; before -⟨nd, ld, gh, gn⟩; word final; before heterosyllabic vowel		/aʊ/	out, aloud, bough	/uː/ /ʌ/ /oʊ/	soup, you, through touch soul, dough	/juː/ (GA): ampoule, coupon
ou	before multiple consonants; final vowel in word; bef. 2+ unstressed syllables; next syllable contains /ɪ/; before cons. + ⟨e, i⟩ + vowel		/ʊ/	could, should	/ʌ/ /oʊ/	trouble, country boulder	/ɒ/ cough, fount (printing)
ou	unstressed		/ə/	camouflage, labour, nervous	/ʊ/ /ʊər/	bivouac, bedouin, potpourri detour, fourchette	/ʌ/ hiccough /w/ ratatouille, ouabaine
ow	stressed		/aʊ/	owl, bow, row, sow, allow	/oʊ/	own, bow, row, sow, alow	/ɒ/ acknowledge /ɒ/ or /ʌ/ rowlock
ow	unstressed		/oʊ/	yellow, teabowl, landowner	/aʊ/	peafowl, sundowner	/əw/ cassowary, toward
oy			/ɔɪ/	boy, doyenne, foyer, voyage	/waɪ/	voyeur, noyade	/oʊj/ oyez /aɪ/ coyote (GA) /i/ buoy (GA)
u	in closed syllables: before multiple consonants; final vowel in word		/ʌ/	budding, cuckold, mullet but, gull, fuss	/ʊ/	pudding, cuckoo, bullet, put, full, puss	/uː/ ruthless, brut /juː/ butte, debut, fuchsia, tulle
u	in open syllables: before single consonant; before cons. + -⟨le⟩ or ⟨r⟩ + vowel; before heterosyllabic vowel; word-final		/juː/	mute, student, puny, union, fuses bugle, hubris, nutrient (RP) duo, nuance, pursuant, ensuing menu, emu, impromptu (RP)	/ʌ/ /uː/	study, punish, bunion, buses butler, cutlery, subrogate super, lunar, absolute, revolution suet, lucrative, lugubrious hindu, tutu, tofu, truth	/ɪ/ busy, business
u	in open syllables after /r, ʃ, ʒ, j/, or cons. + /l/: before single consonant; before cons. + -⟨le⟩ or ⟨r⟩ + vowel; before heterosyllabic vowel; word-final		/uː/	rule, chute, June, recluses scruples, rubric truant, fluent, cruelty flu, guru	/juː/	overuse, underused	/ʌ/ runaway, truculent, clubroom /ʊ/ sugar
u	after ⟨g⟩	before ⟨e, i, y⟩	∅	guest, guide, vaguer	/w/	segue, distinguish	/juː/ ambiguity
u	after ⟨g⟩	before ⟨a, o⟩	/w/	language	∅	guard, languor	/juː/ jaguar (RP)
u	after ⟨q⟩		/w/	quail, conquest, banquet, quite	∅	quay, conquer, bouquet, mosquito	
u	unstressed		/ə/	support, industry, useful, medium	/juː/ /ʌ/	debut guffaw, unruly, upend, vulgarity	/ɪ, ə/ minute, lettuce
ue	after ⟨g⟩	word final	∅	league, tongue	/juː/	ague	/eɪ/ merengue, /i/ dengue
ue	after ⟨g⟩	word medial	/ɛ/ /ə/	guest, guessed, baguette guerrilla, beleaguered	∅ /juː/	vaguely, intrigued argued	/weɪ/ segued, /wɛ/ guenon /wə/ unguent, /wiː/ ungues /juːə/ arguer /iː/ Portuguese
ue	after ⟨r⟩, or cons. + ⟨l⟩		/uː/	true, clue, gruesome, blues	/uːə/	influence, cruel, fluent, bluest	/uː.ɪ/ cruet, /uːɛ/ influential
ue	elsewhere (except after ⟨q⟩)		/juː/	virtue, cue, valued, hue, muesli	/juːə/ /juːɛ/ /uː/ /uːə/	fuel, constituent, rescuer innuendo, statuesque, minuet Sue, snafued (GA: due, revenue); GA: duel, pursuer	/uː.ɪ/ suet, /uːɛ/ muezzin /juːiː/ tenues, /juːeɪ/ habitue /jʊər/ puerile, /ʊ/ muenster /weɪ/ suede, Venezuelan /wɛ/ pueblo, /wɪ/ desuetude
ui	after ⟨g⟩		/ɪ/ /aɪ/	guild, guitar, intriguing, roguish guide, guise, beguile	/wɪ/	anguish, penguin, linguist, sanguine	/iː/ beguine, /wiː/ linguine /juːɪ/ arguing, aguish, contiguity
ui	after ⟨j, r⟩ or cons. + ⟨l⟩		/uː/	juice, cruise, sluice, fruiting	/uːɪ/	fruition, fluid, ruin, druid, truism, incongruity	/uː.j/ alleluia /ʊ/ Cruickshank
ui	elsewhere (except after ⟨q⟩)		/juːɪ/ /ɪ/	conduit, cuing, genuine, Buick, circuitous, Jesuit build, circuit, biscuit, pursuivant	/uː/ /juːə/ /juː/ /uːɪ/	suit, suitable, nuisance (GA) intuitive (RP), promiscuity nuisance (RP), puisne suicide, tui, Inuit, Hinduism	/aɪ/ duiker, /ə/ circuitry /wɪ/ cuisine, suint /wiː/ suite, ennui, tuille /uːaɪ/ sui generis /weɪ/ feng shui
uu			/ju.ə/	continuum, residuum	/u.ə/	menstruum	/(j)uːʌ/ duumvir /juː/ vacuum /uː/ muumuu /wʊ/ squush
uy			/aɪ/	buy, buyout, guyed	/iː/ /wi/	guyot, cliquy, plaguy obsequy, soliloquy	/jʊɪ/ toluyl /uːj/ thuya, gruyere /wiː/ puy /wiːj/ tuyere
w					/uː/	cwm	/oʊ/ pwn
y	before multiple consonants; bef. 2+ unstressed syllables; next syllable contains /ɪ/		/ɪ/	myth, cryptic, system, symbol cylinder, typical, pyramid, dynasty cynic, lyric, lytic, syringe, yttrium	/aɪ/	cyclone, hyphen, psyche, python hydrogen, dynasty (GA) cyclist, hybrid, psychic, typist	
y	before single consonant; before cons. + -⟨le⟩ or ⟨r⟩ + vowel; word-final		/aɪ/	typing, style, paralyze, nylon cycle, cypress, hydrate, lycra awry, by, deny, sky, supply	/ɪ/	byzantine, synod, synagogue, Cypriote, sycophantic	
y	unstressed	word-final	/i/	any, city, happy, only, supply (adv)			/aɪ/ ally (n)
y	unstressed	elsewhere	/ɪ/	bicycle, oxygen, polymer, dyslexia, physique, synonymous	/ə/ /aɪ/ /i/	sibyl, pyjamas dynamics, hypothesis, typhoon anyway, everything	

=== Combinations of vowel letters and ⟨r⟩ ===
Spelling			Major value (IPA)	Examples of major value	Minor values (IPA)	Examples of minor value	Exceptions
ar	before a vowel	next syllable contains /ɪ, ə/ within the same morpheme	/ær/	apparent, arid, guarantee, mariners, parish	/ɛər/	parent, garish	
ar	before a vowel	followed by a morpheme boundary	/ɛər/	carer, scary, sharing, rarity	/ær/ /ɑːr/	comparable, comparative faraway, tsarist	
ar	before a vowel	otherwise	/ɛər/	area, care, pharaoh, vary, wariness	/ɑːr/	aria, are, safaris	/ɒr/ quarantine, waratah
ar	elsewhere	stressed	/ɑːr/	argyle, car, farce			/ɛər/ scarce /ær/ sarsaparilla (GA) /ɜːr/ dharna
ar	elsewhere	after /w/	/ɔːr/	war, award, dwarf, warning, quarter			
ar	elsewhere	unstressed	/ər/	circular, pillar			
aer			/ɛər/	aerial, aeroplane	/ɪər/	chimaera	/ər/ anaerobe
air			/ɛər/	cairn, millionaire, dairy			/aɪər/ hetaira /aɪˈɪər/ zaire
aor			/eɪˈɔːr/	aorta	/aʊ.r/ /ɔːr/	Maori extraordinary	
arr	before a spoken vowel		/ær/	marry, barrel, arrow, barren, carrot	/ɑːr/	starry, barring	
arr	elsewhere		/ɑːr/	scarred, Parr			
aur			/ɔːr/	dinosaur, aural, aura, Laura	/ɒr/	laurel, Laurence	
awer			/ɔː.ər/	gnawer, rawer, thawer			/ɔːr/ drawer
ayer, ayor			/eɪ.ər/	layer, mayor, soothsayer			
er	before a vowel		/ɪər/	here, series, query, merely	/ɛər/ /ɛr/ /iːˈr/	compere, there, werewolf derelict, heresy, perish, very derail, reremind	/ɜːr/ were, weregild
er	elsewhere	stressed	/ɜːr/	her, jerk, coerced, merchant	/ɛər/	berceuse	/ɑːr/ clerk, sergeant
er	elsewhere	unstressed	/ər/	starter, fewer, Berber, arguer, shower	/eɪ/ (or /ər/)	dossier, foyer	
ear	before a consonant	before a morpheme boundary	/ɪər/	dearly, fearless, tearful, yearling	/ɛər/	bearskin, swearword	/ɜːr/ heard
ear	before a consonant	elsewhere	/ɜːr/	pearly, hearse, yearning, earth	/ɑːr/	hearken, hearty, hearth	/ɪər/ beard, peart /eɪ.ər/ bearnaise /iˈɑːr/ rearm
ear	elsewhere		/ɪər/	fear, year, appear, hearing,	/ɛər/ /iː.ər/	pear, bearish, wearing linear, nuclear, stearin	/iːˈr/ tearoom
eer			/ɪər/	cheering, beer, eerie	/iːər/	freer, seers	
eir			/ɛər/	heir, madeira, their	/ɪər/	weird, weir, eyrie	/aɪər/ oneiric, eirenic
eor			/iɔːr/	deorbit, reorganise	/ɪər/	theory	
err	before a spoken vowel		/ɛr/	error, merry, terrible, herring, ferret	/ɜːr/	referring	
err	elsewhere		/ɜːr/	err, preferred			
eur	after /r, ʃ, ʒ, j/, cons. + /l/		/ʊər/	pleurisy			
eur	elsewhere		/jʊər/	euro, liqueur, neural	/ɜːr/	masseur, voyeur	/iː.ɜːr/ theurgy
ir	before a spoken vowel	usually	/aɪər/	pirate, virus, iris, spiral	/ɪr/	mirage, virile, iridescent, spirit	
ir	before a spoken vowel	derived from a word with silent ⟨e⟩ following	/aɪər/	wirable, aspiring			
ir	before silent ⟨e⟩		/aɪər/	hire, fires, mired			
ir	elsewhere	stressed	/ɜːr/	bird, fir			/ɪər/ menhir
ir	elsewhere	unstressed	/ər/	elixir, kefir, triumvir			
ier			/ɪər/	cashier, fierce, frontier, pier	/aɪər/ /iər/	shier, fiery, hierarchy, plier busier, rapier, glacier, hosiery	/i.ɛər/ concierge, premiere /ieɪ/ atelier, bustier, dossier /iːər/ skier
irr	before a spoken vowel		/ɪr/	mirror, squirrel, cirrus, tirret	/ɜːr/	stirrer	
irr	elsewhere		/ɜːr/	whirred			
or	after ⟨w⟩		/ɜːr/	word, work, worst	/ɔːr/	worn, sword, swore	
or	elsewhere	stressed	/ɔːr/	ford, boring, more	/ɒr/	forest, moral	/ɜːr/ whorl /ʌr/ borough ∅ comfortable
or	elsewhere	unstressed	/ər/	gladiator, major, equator			
oar			/ɔːr/	boar, coarse, keyboard, soaring			/ər/ cupboard, starboard /oʊˈɑːr/ coarctate
oer			/oʊ.ər/	partygoer, forgoer	/uː.ər/	undoer, canoer	/ɜːr/ oersted
oir			/wɑːr/	reservoir, memoir, moire, soiree	/ɔɪər/	coir, loir, Moira	/waɪər/ choir /ər/ avoirdupois
oor			/ʊər/	poor, moor, boorish, roorback	/ɔːr/	door, flooring	/ər/ whippoorwill /oʊˈɔːr/ coordinate
orr	stressed	after ⟨w⟩	/ʌr/	worry			
orr	stressed	elsewhere	/ɒr/	horrid, porridge, torrent, correlate	/ɒr/ (RP), /ɑːr/ (GA)	borrow, sorry	/ɔːr/ Andorra
orr	unstressed		/ər/	correct, corrupt, haemorrhage, horrific			
our	stressed		/ɔːr/	four, courtesan, discourse	/aʊər/ /ɜːr/ /ʊər/	hour, flour, scours journey, courtesy, scourge tour, courier, gourd, velour	/ʌr/ courage, flourish
our	unstressed		/ər/	labour, colourful	/ʊr/ /ʊər/	entourage, potpourri detour, fourchette	
ur	before a vowel	elsewhere	/jʊər/	lure, purity, curing	/ʊər/	allure, guru, Silurian	/ɛr/ bury, burial
ur	before a vowel	after /r, ʃ, ʒ, j/, cons. + /l/	/ʊər/	rural, jury, plural, sure, assurance, allure			
ur	elsewhere	stressed	/ɜːr/	turn, occur, curdle	/ʌr/		/ʊər/ langur
ur	elsewhere	unstressed	/ər/	sulphur, jodhpur, bulgur, murmur			
urr	before a spoken vowel		/ʌr/	current, hurry, flurry, burrow, turret	/ɜːr/	furry, blurring	
urr	elsewhere		/ɜːr/	burr, blurred			
yr
yr	before a spoken vowel	bef. 2+ unstressed syllables; next syllable contains /ɪ/	/ɪr/	syrup, Pyrenees, lyric, pyramid, Syria, myriad, syringe, tyranny, pyrrhic			
yr	before a spoken vowel	elsewhere	/aɪər/	tyrant, gyrate, pyrotechnic, thyroid			
yr	before silent ⟨e⟩		/aɪər/	lyre, pyre, tyres, gyred			
yr	elsewhere	stressed	/ɜːr/	myrtle, myrrh			
yr	elsewhere	unstressed	/ər/	martyr			

=== Combinations of other consonant and vowel letters ===
Spelling		Major value (IPA)	Examples of major value	Minor values (IPA)	Examples of minor value	Exceptions
al	Excluding before ⟨f, k, l, m, t⟩ (see below)	/æl/	pal, talcum, algae, alp	/ɔːl/	bald, Nepal, always, walrus	/ɔː/ falcon (also with /ɔːl/, /ɒl/ or /æl/) /ɒl/ false (RP; also /ɔːl/)
alf	before a vowel	/ælf/	alfalfa, malfeasance			
alf	elsewhere	/ɑːf/ (RP) /æf/ (GA)	calf, half			/ɔːlf/ palfrey /eɪ/ halfpenny
alk	morpheme-final	/ɔːk/	stalk, walking, talkative, chalkboard			
alk	elsewhere	/ælk/	alkaline, grimalkin, valkyrie	/ɔːlk, ɒlk/ (Note: /ɒlk/ or /ɔːlk/ in RP; always /ɔːlk/ in in GA)	balkanise	
all	morpheme-final	/ɔːl/	call, fallout, smaller	/æl/	shall, pall-mall (RP)	/ɛl/ pall-mall (GA)
all	elsewhere	/æl/	alley, callus, shallow	/ɒl/ /əl/	wallet, swallow allow, dialled	/ɛl/ marshmallow (GA)
alm	morpheme-final	/ɑː(l)m/	alms, palm, calmer, embalming			/ɔːm/ halm
alm	elsewhere	/ælm/	palmate, salmonella, talmud	/ɔːlm/	almanac, almost, instalment	/æm/ salmon /ɑːlm/ almond (GA) (Note: According to the Longman Pronunciation Dictionary, 75% of Americans pronounce almond as /ˈɑːlmənd/.) /əlm/ signalment /ɑːm/ almond (RP), balmy, palmistry.
alt		/ɔːlt, ɒlt/ (Note: /ɒlt/ or /ɔːlt/ in RP; always /ɔːlt/ in in GA)	alter, malt, salty, basalt	/ælt/	alto, shalt, saltation, asphalt (RP)	/ɑːlt/ gestalt (GA) /əlt/ royalty, penalty
ange	word final	/eɪndʒ/	arrange, change, mange, strange	/ændʒ/	flange, phalange	/ɑːnʒ/ melange /ɒndʒ/ blancmange /ɪndʒ/ orange
aste	word final	/eɪst/	chaste, lambaste, paste, taste	/æst/	cineaste, caste (GA), pleonaste	/ɑːst/ (out)caste (RP) /əsteɪ/ namaste
-ci	unstressed before vowel	/ʃ/	special, gracious	/si/ (also /ʃ/)	species	
-cqu		/kw/	acquaint, acquire	/k/	lacquer, racquet	
ed	word final after /t/ or /d/	/ɪd, əd/	loaded, waited			
ed	word final after a voiceless sound	/t/	piped, enserfed, snaked	/ɛd/	biped, underfed	/ɪd, əd/ naked
ed	word final after a lenis sound	/d/	limbed, enisled, unfeared	/ɛd/	imbed, misled, infrared	/ɪd, əd/ beloved
es	word final after a fricative	/ɪz, əz/	mazes, washes, axes, bases, pieces	/iːz/	axes, bases, feces, oases	
ex-	unstressed before ⟨h⟩ or a vowel	/ɪɡz, əɡz/	exist, examine, exhaust	/ɛks/	exhale	
gu-	before ⟨a⟩	/ɡw/	bilingual, guano, language	/ɡ/	guard, guarantee	
(a)isle	word final	/aɪl/	aisle, isle, enisle, lisle			
le	word final after non ⟨r⟩ cons.	/əl/	little, table	/l/	orle, isle	/leɪ/ boucle
ngue	word final	/ŋ/	tongue, harangue, meringue	/ŋɡeɪ/	merengue, distingué	/ŋɡi/ dengue
old		/oʊld/	blindfold, older, bold	/əld/ /ɒld/	scaffold, kobold (also /ɒld/) doldrums, solder (RP)	
olk		/oʊk/	yolk, folklore	/ɒlk/	polka (RP), kolkhoz	/oʊlk/ polka (GA)
oll		/ɒl/	dollhouse, pollen, trolley, holly	/oʊl/	tollhouse, swollen, troller, wholly	/ɔː/ atoll (GA) /ɔɪ/ cholla /əl/ caroller, collide
olm		/ɒlm/	olm, dolmen	/oʊlm/	enrolment, holmium	/oʊm/ holm (oak)
ong	morpheme-final	/ɒŋ/ (RP) /ɔːŋ/ (GA)	songstress, along, strong, wronger	/ɒŋ/	tonger, bong, dugong, tongs	/ʌŋ/ among
ong	elsewhere	/ɒŋɡ/	congress, jongleur, bongo, conger, ongoing, nongraded	/ɒndʒ/ /ʌŋɡ/ /ʌndʒ/	congeries, longevity, pongee monger, humongous, mongrel sponger, longe, spongy	/ʌŋ/ tongue /ənɡ/ congratulate, lemongrass /əndʒ/ congeal, congestion /ɒnʒ/ allonge /oʊnʒ/ congé (GA)
ought		/ɔːt/	bought, brought, fought, nought, ought, sought, thought, wrought	/aʊt/	doughty, drought	
qu-		/kw/	queen, quick	/k/	liquor, mosquito	
que	word final	/k/	mosque, bisque	/keɪ/	manque, risqué	/kjuː/ barbeque /ki/ pulque
re	word final after non ⟨r⟩ cons.	/ər/	timbre, acre, ogre, centre	/reɪ/, /ri/ /rə/	cadre (GA), compadre, emigre genre, oeuvre, fiacre	
ron	word final after vowel	/rɒn/	neuron, moron, interferon, aileron	/rən/	baron, heron, environ	/ərn/ iron /roʊn/ chaperon
sci-	unstressed before a vowel	/ʃ/	conscience, luscious, prosciutto	/saɪ/	sciatica, sciamachy, sciential	/ʃi/ conscientious, fasciated /sɪ/ (RP) omniscient, prescience
scle	word final	/səl/	corpuscle, muscle	/skəl/	mascle	
-se	word final after vowel (noun)	/s/	house, excuse, moose, anise, geese	/z/	prose, nose, tease, guise, compromise	/zeɪ/ marchese
-se	word final after vowel (verb)	/z/	house, excuse, choose, arise, please	/s/	grouse, dose, lease, chase, promise	
-si	unstressed after a vowel	/ʒ/	vision, occasion, explosion, illusion	/zi/	easier, enthusiasm, physiological	
-si	unstressed after a cons.	/ʃ/	pension, controversial, compulsion			/si/ tarsier, Celsius
-ssi	unstressed before a vowel	/ʃ/	mission, passion, Russia, session	/si/	potassium, dossier, messier	
-sti	unstressed before a vowel	/stʃ/	question, Christian, suggestion			
-sure	unstressed after a vowel	/ʒər/	leisure, treasure			
-sure	unstressed after a cons.	/ʃər/	tonsure, censure			
-the	unstressed	/ð/	scathe, spathe			
-ti	unstressed before a vowel	/ʃ/	cautious, patient, inertia, initial, ration	/ti/ /ʃi/	patios, consortia, fiftieth, courtier ratios, minutia, initiate, negotiate	/taɪ/ cation, cationic /ʒ/ equation /tj/ rentier (GA)
-ture	unstressed	/tʃər/	nature, picture			
-zure	unstressed	/ʒər/	seizure, azure			

== Sound-to-spelling correspondences ==
The following table shows for each sound the various spelling patterns used to denote it, starting with the prototypical pattern(s) followed by others in alphabetical order. Some of these patterns are very rare or unique (such as ⟨gh⟩ for /p/, ⟨ph⟩ for /v/, ⟨i⟩ for /ɑː/). An ellipsis (⟨…⟩) stands for an intervening consonant.

=== Consonants ===
Arranged in the order of the IPA consonant tables.

==== Common graphemes ====
Phoneme	Spelling	Usage	Example Words
/m/	m	Most of the time	mine, jam
/m/	mm	double consonant rule (Note: A 1:1:1 word is the term used in classrooms to indicate a one syllable word that ends with only one short vowel and one consonant. When a suffix is added to the word, the ending consonant is doubled. This spelling is also apparent in multisyllablic words between short vowels. 'ff', 'll', 'ss', and 'zz' often end in words and roots with a short vowel right before them.)	hammer
/m/	mb	End of a few words	thumb
/n/	n	Most of the time	nice, pin
/n/	nn	double consonant rule	winning
/n/	kn	Start of some words of Germanic origin	knee
/n/	gn	Start and end of a few words	gnome, sign
/ŋ/	ng	Most of the time	sing
/ŋ/	n	right before a /k/ spelling	link
/p/	p	Most of the time	pond, hip
/p/	pp	double consonant rule	clapping
/b/	b	Most of the time	blue, cab
/b/	bb	double consonant rule	rubbing
/t/	t	Most of the time	ten, lit
/t/	tt	double consonant rule	knitter
/d/	d	Most of the time	din, pad
/d/	dd	double consonant rule	hidden
/k/	k	word or syllable-initial: right before ⟨e, i, y⟩ root or word-final: after a consonant, vowel team or within a VCe spelling	kid, Ken, sky, milk, book, make
/k/	c	right before ⟨a, o, u⟩ or a consonant	cat, cob, cut, clap
/k/	ck	root or word-final: right after a short vowel	pick, lacking
/k/	cc	in the middle of words before ⟨a, o, u⟩	hiccup, raccoon
/k/	ch	usually in words of Greek origin	chemistry, stomach
/k/	x	right before 'c' /s/	excite
/k/	que	end of a few words	boutique
/g/	g	most cases	goat, tag
/g/	gg	double consonant rules	begging
/f/	f	most cases	fly, leaf
/f/	ff	double consonant rule	huff, bluffing
/f/	ph	Ancient greek words	phone, graph
/v/	v	most cases	vine
/v/	ve	end of words when not right before a long VCe spelling	give, sleeve, twelve
/θ/	th	Most of the time	thin, bath
/ð/	th	Most of the time	them, feather
/s/	s	often at the beginning, or right after an unvoiced consonant or short vowel	slime, cups, disk
/s/	ss	double consonant rule	hiss
/s/	c	right before ⟨e, i, y⟩	cent, city, cymbal
/s/	se	end of a word or root right after a vowel team	horse
/s/	ce	end of word or root right after a short vowel and consonant	dance
/s/	sc	beginning of some words	scissors
/s/	st	within the syllables /sən/ or /səl/	listen, whistle
/z/	z	word-initial	zoo
/z/	s	right after a voiced consonant or non-short or r-colored vowel	cans, bees
/z/	zz	double consonant rule	jazz, buzzy
/z/	ze	end of words when not right before a long VCe spelling	sneeze
/z/	se	end of words right after a vowel team	pause
/z/	x	beginning of a few words	xylophone
/ʃ/	sh	most of the time	ship, fish
/ʃ/	ti	in words of Latin origin	attention, ratio
/ʃ/	ci	in words of Latin origin	special, delicious
/ʒ/	s	usually before -ure	treasure, leisure
/ʒ/	si	usually before -on	vision, explosion
/h/	h	most of the time	helmet
/r/	r	most of the time	road
/r/	wr	word-initial	wreck
/r/	rh	word-initial	rhino
/l/	l	most of the time	lamp
/l/	ll	double consonant rule	well
/j/	y	most of the time	yes
/j/	i	glide before a unstressed vowel or vowel team in a syllable	onion
/w/	w	most of the time	water
/tʃ/	ch	most of the time	chop, each
/tʃ/	tch	after a short vowel	catch, itch
/dʒ/	j	mostly before ⟨a, o, u⟩	jam, joy, jug
/dʒ/	g	before ⟨e, i, y⟩ between a silent ⟨e⟩ spelling from ⟨ge⟩ where the ⟨e⟩ is dropped before adding a suffix	gem, giraffe, energy cage, huge changing
/dʒ/	ge	word-final after a non-short vowel	large
/dʒ/	dge	word-final after a short vowel	bridge
/dʒ/	dg	from ⟨dge⟩ where the ⟨e⟩ is dropped before adding a suffix	judging
/ks/	x	word-final	six
/ks/	Most other /ks/ spellings are clusters of a /k/ and /s/ spelling. See § Rarer graphemes.		
/kw/	qu	Most of the time	queen
/gz/	x	after a vowel and right before a short vowel	exam

==== Rarer graphemes ====
Consonants
IPA	Spelling	Examples
/m/	chm, gm, lm, mbe, me, mh, mme, mn, mp, sme	drachm, phlegm, salmon, combe, forme, mho, femme, autumn, assumption, disme
/n/	cn, dn, gn, gne, kn, mn, mp, nd, ne, ng, nh, nne, nt, pn, sn, sne	cnidarian, Wednesday, coigne, mnemonic, comptroller, handsome, borne, ngaio, piranha, tonne, topgallant-sail, pneumonia, puisne, mesne
/ŋ/	nc, nd, ngh, ngue, nh	charabanc, handkerchief, sangh, tongue, sinh
/p/	gh, pe, (ph), ppe	hiccough, thorpe, diphthong (RP), (Note: In 2008, 61% of British people pronounced diphthong as /ˈdɪpθɒŋ/, though phoneticians prefer /ˈdɪfθɒŋ/.) steppe
/b/	be, bh, pb, gb	barbe, bhang, cupboard, Igbo
/t/	bt, cht, ct, d, dt, ed, ght, kt, pt, phth, st, te, th, tte	doubt, yacht, victual, iced, veldt, dressed, lighter, ktypeite, ptarmigan, phthisical, cestui, forte, thyme, cigarette
/d/	ddh, bd, de, dh, ed, ld	Buddhism, bdellium, horde, dharma, abandoned, solder,
/k/	cch, ch, cq, cqu, cque, cu, ke, kh, kk, lk, q, qh, qu, (g)	zucchini, chord, tack, acquire, lacquer, sacque, biscuit, burke, khaki, trekker, polka-dotted, quorum, fiqh, liquor, (strength)
/ɡ/	ckg, gge, gh, gu, gue	gig, egg, blackguard, pogge, ghost, guard, catalogue
/f/	fe, ffe, ft, gh, lf, phe, pph, (u)	carafe, gaffe, soften, laugh, half, ouphe, sapphire, lieutenant (RP)
/v/	vv, f, lve, ph, u, w, zv, b, bh	savvy, of, halve, Stephen, quetsch, weltanschauung, rendezvous, Habdalah, kethibh
/θ/	the, chth, phth, tth, h, t	absinthe, chthonic, apophthegm, eighth, tanh
/ð/	the, dd, dh, y	breathe, gorsedd, edh, ye (mock archaic)
/s/	cc, ce, ps, sce, sch, sh, sse, sses, (sth), sw, t, th, ti, (ts), tsw, tzs, tz, (z)	song, mess, city, flaccid, ounce, psalm, coalesce, schism (RP), horse, dishonest, finesse, chausses, asthma (RP), sword, tzitzit, zizith, Kiribati, tsunami (GA), boatswain, britzska, waltz (RP), quartz
/z/	cz, (sc), se, sh, sp, ss, (sth), ts, tz, zh, zs (one pronunciation), c (some dialects)	czar, crescent (RP), (Note: The majority of British people, and the great majority of younger ones, pronounce crescent as /ˈkrɛzənt/.) tease, déshabillé, raspberry, dissolve, asthma (GA), tsarina, tzar, zho, (vizsla), (electricity)
/ʃ/	sh, c, ce, ch, che, chi, chsi, ci, s, sc, sch, sche, schsch, sci, sesh, she, shh, shi, si, sj, ss, ssi, ti, psh, zh, x	shin, speciality, ocean, machine, quiche, marchioness, fuchsia, special, sugar, crescendo, schmooze, schottische, eschscholtzia, conscience, tortoiseshell, galoshe, shh, cushion, expansion, sjambok, tissue, mission, nation, pshaw, pirozhki, paxiuba
/ʒ/	(ci), g, ge, j, s, si, ssi, ti, z, zh, zhe, (zi), zs (one pronunciation)	coercion (GA), genre, beige, bijou, leisure, division, abscission, equation, seizure, muzhik, uzhe, (Note: The primarily spoken-only abbreviation of usual has no standardised spelling, but is often spelled uzhe.) brazier (GA), (vizsla)
/x/	ch (in Scottish English), gh (in Irish English)	loch, lough
/h/	wh, j, ch	who, fajita, chutzpah
/r/	r, rh, wr	run, rhyme, wrong
/l/	lh, lle, gl, sle, ln (some dialects)	pelham, gazelle, imbroglio, aisle, (kiln)
/j/	y, h, i, j, l, ll, z, r (one pronunciation)	vinho verde, onion, hallelujah, llano, tortilla, capercailzie, February (Note: In 2008, 64% of Americans and 39% of British people pronounce February as /ˈfɛbjuɛri/. Arguably, the speakers can also infer that the ⟨r⟩ is silent in the word and ⟨u⟩ commonly stands for a diphthong-like sound: /juː/.)
/hw/	wh (in some dialects)	which
/w/	u, h, ou, ju, wh (in most dialects)	persuade, choir, ouija, marijuana, what
/ts/	ts, tz, zz, z	nuts, quartz, pizza, Nazi
/dz/	ds, dz, z	pads, podzol, jiaozi
/tʃ/	c, cc, cch, (che), chi, cs, cz, q, t, tche, te, (th), (ti), ts, tsch, tz, tzs, tzsch, h	cello, bocce, kaccha, niche (GA), falchion, csardas, Czech, qi, nature, escutcheon, righteous, posthumous (GA), bastion (GA), britska (US), putsch, britz(s)ka (US), Nietzschean, sinh
/dʒ/	(ch), d, di, dj, dzh, gg, gi, jj, t, zh	sandwich (RP), graduate, soldier, adjust, Tadzhik, veggies, Belgian, hajj, congratulate (US), (Note: The majority of Americans, and the great majority of younger ones, pronounce congratulate as /kənˈɡrædʒəleɪt/.) guzheng
/ks/	xx, cast, cc, chs, cks, cques, cs, cz, kes, ks, lks, ques, xc, xe, xs, xsc, xsw	doxxing, forecastle, accent, tachs, backs, sacques, sacs, eczema, burkes, yaks, caulks, toques, excel, axe, exsert, exscind, coxswain
/gz/	x, ggs, gs, xh	exam, eggs, bags, exhilarate

=== Vowels ===
Vowels
IPA	Spelling	Examples
/æ/	a, a...e, (ag), ai, al, (ar), (au), ea, ei, i, o (one pronunciation)	bat, have, seraglio (GA), plaid, salmon, sarsaparilla (GA), laugh (GA), poleax enceinte, meringue, (chometz)
/ɑː/	a, a...e, aa, aae, aah, aahe, (ag), ah, (au), (i), o (one pronunciation), ar (one pronunciation)	father, garage, salaam, baaed, aah, aahed, seraglio (RP), blah, aunt (RP), lingerie (GA), (chometz), (schoolmarm)
/aɪ/	i...e, ae, ai, aie, (aille), ais, ay, aye, ei, eigh, eu, ey, eye, i, ia, ic, ie, ig, igh, ighe, is, oi, (oy), ui, uy, uye, y, y...e, ye	fine, maestro, krait, shanghaied, canaille (RP), aisle, kayak, aye, heist, height, deuddarn, heyduck, eye, mic, diaper, indict, tie, sign, high, sighed, isle, choir, coyote (GA), guide, buy, guyed, why, type, bye
/aʊ/	ou, ow, ao, aou, aow, aowe, au, odh, ough, oughe, owe, iao, iau	out, now, manoao, caoutchouc, miaow, miaowed, gauss, bodhrán, bough, ploughed, vowed, jiao, chiaus
/ɛ/	e, a, ae, ai, ay, e...e, ea, eh, ei, eo, ie, oe, ue, ee (one pronunciation)	met, many, aesthetic, said, says, there, deaf, feh, heifer, jeopardy, friend, foetid, guess, (threepence)
/eɪ/	a, a...e, aa, ae, ai, ai...e, aig, aigh, ais, alf, ao, au, ay, aye, e (é), e...e, ea, eg, ee (ée), eh, ei, ei...e, eig, eigh, eighe, er, ere, es, et, ete, ey, eye, ez, (ie), (oeh), ue, uet	bass (music), rate, quaalude, reggae, rain, cocaine, arraign, straight, palais, halfpenny, gaol, gauge, hay, played, ukulele (café), crepe, steak, matinee (soirée), thegn, eh, veil, beige, reign, eight, weighed, dossier, espaliered, demesne, ballet, crocheted, they, obeyed, chez, lingerie (GA), boehmite (GA), merengue, bouquet
/ə/	a, e, i, o, u, y, a...e, ae, ah, ai, anc, ath, au, ea, eau, eh, ei, eig, eo, eou, (eu), gh, ia, ie, io, iou, o...e, oa, oe, oh, oi, oo, op, ou, (ough), (u...e), ua, ue, (ui), uo, wa...e	tuna, oven, pencil, pilot, opus, beryl, carcase, antennaed, Messiah, mountain, blancmange, tuath, sergeant, bureaucrat, keffiyeh, mullein, foreign, truncheon, timeous, amateur (RP), burgh, spatial, deficient, legion, conscious, awesome, starboard, biocoenosis, matzoh, porpoise, whipoorwill, topgallant, callous, borough (RP), minute (GA), piquant, guerilla, circuit (GA), languor, gunwale
/ɪ/	i, y, a, a...e, ai, e, ea, ee, ei, i...e, ia, ie, ii, o, oe, u, u...e, ui	bit, myth, orange, chocolate, bargain, pretty, mileage, breeches, counterfeit, medicine, carriage, sieve, shiitake, women, oedema, busy, minute, build
/iː/	e, e...e, i, i...e, a, ae, aoi, ay, ea, ee, e'e, ei, eo, ey, eye, ie, ie...e, is, ix, oe, oi, ue, ui, uy, y	be, cede, ski, machine, bologna, algae, Taoiseach, quay, beach, bee, e'en, deceit, people, key, keyed, field, hygiene, debris, prix, amoeba, chamois, dengue, beguine, guyot, ynambu
/ɒ/	a, o, ach, au, eau, oh, (ou), ow, e, (eo)	watch, lock, yacht, sausage, bureaucracy, cough (RP), acknowledge, entrée, cheongsam (RP)
/ɔː/	a, al, au, au...e, augh, aughe, aw, awe, ea, (o), oa, oss, (ou), ough	bald, talk, author, cause, caught, overslaughed, jaw, awe, ealdorman, broad, crossjack, cough, bought
/ɔɪ/	oi, oy, eu, oll, ooi, oye, ui, (uoy), uoye, (awy)	avoid, toy, lawyer, Freudian, cholla, rooibos, enjoyed, schuit, buoyant, buoyed (RP), (lawyer)
/oʊ/	o, o...e, aoh, au, aux, eau, eaue, eo, ew, oa, oe, oh, oo, ore, ot, ou, ough, oughe, ow, owe, w	so, bone, pharaoh, mauve, faux, beau, plateaued, yeoman, sew, boat, foe, oh, brooch, forecastle, depot, soul, though, furloughed, know, owe, pwn
/ʌ/	u, o, o...e, oe, oo, ou, uddi, wo, a, au (some dialects), ee (one pronunciation)	sun, son, come, does, flood, touch, studdingsail, twopence, sati, (because), (threepence)
/ʊ/	oo, u, o, o...e, (or), oul, w	foot, full, wolf, pembroke, worsted (RP), should, cwtch
/uː/	u, u...e, oo, oo...e, eew, eu, ew, ieu, ioux, o, o...e, oe, oeu, ooe, ou, ough, ougha, oup, ue, uh, ui, (uo), w, wo	tutu, flute, too, groove, leeward, sleuth, yew, lieu, Sioux, to, lose, shoe, manoeuvre, cooed, soup, through, brougham, coup, true, buhl, fruit, buoy (GA), cwm, two
/juː/	u, u...e, ew, eau, eo, eu, ewe, ieu, iew, (ou), ue, ueue, ui, ut, uu, you	music, use, few, beauty, feodary, feud, ewe, adieu, view, ampoule (GA), cue, queue, nuisance, debut, vacuum, you

Nasal vowels are used by some speakers in words of French origin such as enceinte (/ɒ̃ˈsæ̃t/).

==== Vowels followed by ⟨r⟩ ====
Vowels
IPA	Spelling	Examples
/ær/	ar, arr, ahr, uar	arid, marry, Fahrenheit, guarantee
/ɑːr/	ar, aar, ahr, alla, are, arr, arre, arrh, ear, er, uar, our (some dialects)	car, bazaar, tahr, topgallant-sail, are, parr, bizarre, catarrh, heart, sergeant, guard, (our)
/aɪər/	ire, ier, igher, yer, yre, oir, uyer	fire, crier, higher, flyer, pyre, choir, buyer
/aʊər/	our, ower	sour, tower
/ɛr/	er, err, ur	very, merry, bury
/ɛər/	are, aer, air, aire, ar, ayer, ayor, ayre, e'er, eah, ear, eir, eor, er, ere, err, erre, ert, ey're, eyr	bare, aerial, tahr, hair, millionaire, scarce, prayer, mayor, fayre, ne'er, yeah, bear, heir, ceorl, moderne, where, err (GA), parterre, couvert, they're, eyra
/ər/	ar, er, ir, or, aur, aer	hangar, letter, elixir, author, aurora, anaerobe
/ɜːr/	er, ir, ur, ar, ear, ere, err, erre, eur, eure, irr, irre, oeu, olo, or, our, ueur, uhr, urr, urre, yr, yrrh	defer, fir, fur, dharna, earl, were, err, interred, voyeur, chauffeured (GA), birr, stirred, hors d'oeuvre, colonel, worst, adjourn, liqueur, buhrstone, purr, murre, myrtle, myrrh
/ɪr/	ir, irr, yr, yrrh, er	spirit, mirror, tyranny, pyrrhic, erase
/ɪər/	ere, aer, e're, ear, eare, eer, eere, ehr, eir, eor, er, ers, eyr, ier, iere, ir, oea, yer	here, chimaera, we're, ear, feared, beer, peered, lehr, weird, theory (RP), series, revers, eyrie, pier, premiere, souvenir, diarrhoea (RP), twyer
/ɒr/	or, orr, ar, arr, aur	orange, sorry, quarantine, quarry, laurel
/ɔːr/	or, ore, aor, ar, aur, aure, hors, oar, oare, oor, oore, our, oure, ou're, ouire, owar, ohr, uor	or, fore, extraordinary, war, dinosaur, roquelaure, hors d'oeuvre, oar, soared, door, floored, four, poured, you're, toward (GA), bohrium, fluoridate
/ɔɪər/	oir, awyer	coir, lawyer
/ʌr/	urr, ur, orr, or, our	hurry, burgh, worry, thorough, courage
/ʊr/	our	courier
/ʊər/	oor, our, ure, ur	poor, tour, sure, rural
/jʊər/	ure, ur, eur	cure, purity, neural

== History ==
Inconsistencies between English pronunciation and English spelling have gradually increased ever since the late medieval and early modern period of English's history, with the greatest changes a consequence of English pronunciation naturally diverging across many centuries, while the spelling has remained relatively frozen for the last three or four centuries. Thus, modern English spelling is now only somewhat phonetically representative. There are a number of contributing factors to the difficulty of modern orthography but, most importantly, gradual changes in pronunciation, such as the Great Vowel Shift, which account for a tremendous number of irregularities or conservative English spellings that persist without accurately reflecting the now-current pronunciations. Also, more recent loan words generally carry their original spellings (or spellings that follow transliterations operating according to their own non-English conventions). These loan spellings are thus often not phonetic in English; this includes Romanized words from languages written using non-Roman scripts.

A fairly regular spelling system (originally, the runic alphabet, but later the Latin alphabet) for Old English was swept away by the Norman Conquest in 1066, and the English language as a whole was supplanted in some elite spheres by Norman French for three centuries, eventually emerging with its spelling much influenced by the French writing system (with its Latin letters). English also borrowed massive numbers of words from French during this period, and some kept their French spellings regardless of English pronunciation. The spelling in Middle English texts is very variable, since no standardised spelling existed then, with the same word being spelled in different ways by various authors or even the same author, sometimes even in the same sentence. Instead, spellings at the time were generally meant to more closely resemble the writer's own pronunciation (or accents of the characters they wrote about).

For example, /ʌ/, normally written ⟨u⟩, is spelled with an ⟨o⟩ in come, son, love, etc., due to Norman spelling conventions which prohibited writing ⟨u⟩ before ⟨m, n, v⟩ due to the graphical confusion that would result. (⟨n, u, v⟩ were written identically with two minims in Norman handwriting; ⟨w⟩ was written as two ⟨u⟩ letters; ⟨m⟩ was written with three minims, hence ⟨mm⟩ looked like ⟨vun, nvu, uvu⟩, etc.). Similarly, spelling conventions also prohibited final ⟨v⟩. Hence the identical spellings of the vowel sounds in love and cove are due to ambiguity in the Middle English spelling system, not sound change.

In 1417, Henry V began using English for official correspondence instead of the Latin or French of his predecessors, the latter two languages already having standardised spelling by then. For instance, Latin had one spelling for right (rectus), Old French as used in English law had six, and Middle English had 77. English spelling gradually settled into a standardised form too, though the process took some 500 years.

There was also a series of linguistic sound changes towards the end of the late medieval period, including the Great Vowel Shift, largely responsible for transitioning Middle English into Early Modern English. One such change was the ⟨a⟩ in make, name, and case, for example, changing from a pure vowel to a diphthong. These changes for the most part did not detract from the rule-governed nature of the spelling system; but, in some cases, they introduced confusing inconsistencies, like the well-known example of the many pronunciations of ⟨ough⟩ (tough, through, though, cough, plough, etc.). Most of these changes happened before the arrival of printing in England. However, the arrival of the modern printing press in 1476 in some ways froze phonetic spellings of the time, rather than providing the impetus spelling to realign with ever-changing pronunciations. Furthermore, the press introduced further inconsistencies, partly because of the use of typesetters trained abroad, particularly in the Low Countries. For example, the ⟨h⟩ in ghost was influenced by Flemish, whereas the word was often previously spelled gost. The addition and deletion of a silent e at the ends of words was also sometimes used to make the right-hand margin line up more neatly (though many cases of silent e already existed by this time, having been fully pronounced in earlier varieties of Middle English).

To make matters more complex, literary scholars in the 17th century sometimes added in silent letters to words merely to hearken back to their Latin origins, such as the b in debt and doubt and the p in receipt, which, though never pronounced, were inserted during this period. In other instances, scholars even added letters under the mistaken assumption that they were once pronounced or due to mistaken etymologies (such as the relatively recent l in could, meant to mirror the spellings of would and should).

As literacy rose, and by the time dictionaries were introduced in the mid-17th century, the spelling system of English was starting to stabilise. Occasionally (though rarely), deliberate initiatives in favour of one spelling or another succeeded. In the early 19th century, for instance, American lexicographer Noah Webster, who published children's spelling books and the major American dictionary (Webster's Dictionary), was hugely influential at popularising a small number of spelling conventions that solidified in American English but not British English.

By the 19th century, most words in English had set spellings. Even today, the orthographies of British, American, and other dialects of English align for the most part, differing only in minor (and mutually intelligible) ways. Modern English spelling, with its slightly distinct national variants, spread with the expansion of institutions of public education since the late 19th century, which have rigorously reinforced a sense of "right" and "wrong" spellings.

In The Mill on the Floss (1860), English novelist George Eliot satirised the attitude of the English rural gentry of the 1820s towards orthography:

Mr. Tulliver did not willingly write a letter, and found the relation between spoken and written language, briefly known as spelling, one of the most puzzling things in this puzzling world. Nevertheless, like all fervid writing, the task was done in less time than usual, and if the spelling differed from Mrs. Glegg's,–why, she belonged, like himself, to a generation with whom spelling was a matter of private judgment.

== See also ==
- False etymology
- Spelling bee
- List of English homographs
- The Chaos – a poem by Gerard Nolst Trenité demonstrating the irregularities of English spelling

Conventions

- English plural
- I before E except after C
- Three letter rule

Variant spelling

- American and British English spelling differences
- Misspelling
  - Satiric misspelling
  - Sensational spelling
  - Eye spelling
- Spelling of disc

Graphemes

- Apostrophe
- Eth
- Long s
- Thorn (letter)
- Yogh

Phonetic orthographic systems

- English spelling reform
- Interspel
- Pronouncing Orthography

English scripts

- English alphabet (Latin script)
- American manual alphabet
- Two-handed manual alphabets
- English braille
- American braille
- New York Point
- Shavian alphabet

Words in English

- Lists of English words
- Classical compound
- Ghoti

English phonology

- Regional accents of English
  - IPA chart for English dialects
- Stress and vowel reduction in English
- Initial-stress-derived noun
- Traditional English pronunciation of Latin

=== Orthographies of English-related languages ===
Germanic languages

- Danish
- Dutch
- German
- Icelandic
- Scots

Romance languages

- French
- Italian
- Milanese
- Portuguese
- Spanish

Celtic languages

- Irish
- Scottish Gaelic
- Welsh

Historical languages

- Latin
- Old Norse
- Old English

Constructed languages

- Esperanto

== Bibliography ==
- Albrow, Kenneth H. (1972). The English Writing System: Notes Towards a Description. Schools Council Programme in Linguistics and English Teaching. London: Longman. ISBN 978-0-582-31475-7.
- Algeo, John (2008). "The Effects of the Revolution on Language". In Greene, Jack P.; Pole, Jack R. (eds.). A Companion to the American Revolution. John Wiley & Sons. ISBN 978-0-470-75644-7.
- Aronoff, Mark (Spring 1978). "An English Spelling Convention" (PDF). Linguistic Inquiry. 9 (2). MIT Press: 299–303. JSTOR 4178059.
- Bell, Masha (2004). Understanding English Spelling. Cambridge: Pegasus. ISBN 978-1-903490-12-9.
- Bell, Masha (2007). Learning to Read. Cambridge: Pegasus. ISBN 978-1-903490-23-5.
- Bell, Masha (2009). Rules and Exceptions of English Spelling. Cambridge: Pegasus. ISBN 978-1-903490-39-6.
- Brengelman, Fred H. (1970). "Sounds and Letters in American English". The English Language: An Introduction for Teachers. Englewood Cliffs, NJ: Prentice Hall. pp. 77–98. ISBN 978-0-13-282855-0.
- Brengelman, Fred H. (November 1970). "Generative Phonology and the Teaching of Spelling". English Journal. 59 (8). National Council of Teachers of English: 1113–1118. doi:10.2307/813523. JSTOR 813523.
- Brengelman, Fred H. (1971). "English Spelling as a Marker of Register and Style". English Studies. 52 (1–6). Routledge: 201–209. doi:10.1080/00138387108597420.
- Brengelman, Fred H. (July 1980). "Orthoepists, Printers, and the Rationalization of English Spelling". Journal of English and Germanic Philology. 79 (3). University of Illinois Press: 332–354. JSTOR 27708682.
- Brooks, Greg (2015). Dictionary of the British English Spelling System. Cambridge: Open Book Publishers. ISBN 978-1-78374-107-6.
- Carney, Edward (1994). A Survey of English Spelling. London: Routledge. ISBN 978-0-415-09270-8.
- Chomsky, Carol (1970). "Reading, Writing, and Phonology". Harvard Educational Review. 40 (2): 287–309. doi:10.17763/haer.40.2.y7u0242x76w05624.
- Chomsky, Noam; Halle, Morris (1968). The Sound Pattern of English. New York: Harper & Row. pp. 46, 48–49, 69, 80n, 131n, 148, 174n, 221. ISBN 978-0-06-041276-0.
- Condorelli, Marco (2022). Standardising English Spelling: The Role of Printing on Sixteenth and Seventeenth-Century Graphemic Developments. Cambridge: Cambridge University Press. doi:10.1017/9781009099912. ISBN 978-1-00-909991-2. S2CID 247900493.
- Cook, Vivian; Ryan, Des, eds. (2016). The Routledge Handbook of the English Writing System. Abingdon, Oxon: Routledge. ISBN 978-0-415-71597-3.
- Cummings, Don W. (1988). American English spelling: An informal description. Baltimore: Johns Hopkins University Press. ISBN 978-0-8018-7956-2.
- Crystal, David (2012). Spell It Out: The Curious, Enthralling and Extraordinary Story of English Spelling. Profile Books. ISBN 978-1-84765-822-7.
- Derwing, Bruce L.; Priestly, Tom M. S.; Rochet, Bernard L. (1987). "The description of spelling-to-sound relationships in English, French and Russian: Progress, problems and prospects". In Luelsdorff, Philip A. (ed.). Orthography and Phonology. Amsterdam: John Benjamins. pp. 31–52. ISBN 978-90-272-2039-4.
- Dixon, Robert (1977). Morphographic spelling program. Eugene, OR: Engelman-Becker Press.
- Emerson, Ralph H. (1997). "English Spelling and Its Relation to Sound". American Speech. 72 (3). Duke University Press: 260–288. doi:10.2307/455654. JSTOR 455654.
- Hanna, Paul R.; Hanna, Jean S.; Hodges, Richard E.; Rudorf, Edwin H. (1966). Phoneme-Grapheme Correspondences as Cues to Spelling Improvement (PDF). Washington, D.C.: US Department of Health, Education and Welfare.
- Jared, Debra; Seidenberg, Mark S. (December 1991). "Does Word Identification Proceed from Spelling to Sound to Meaning?". Journal of Experimental Psychology: General. 120 (4). American Psychological Association: 358–394. doi:10.1037/0096-3445.120.4.358.
- Jespersen, Otto (1909). A Modern English Grammar on Historical Principles. Vol. 1: Sounds and Spellings. Heidelberg: C. Winter.
- Khansir, Ali Akbar; Tajeri, Mojtaba (December 2015). "Relationship between Spelling and Pronunciation in English Language" (PDF). Language in India. 15 (12): 66. ISSN 1930-2940. Archived from the original (PDF) on 16 June 2021.
- Luelsdorff, Philip A. (1994). "Developmental Morphographemics II". In Watt, William C. (ed.). Writing Systems and Cognition. Neuropsychology and Cognition. Vol. 6. Dordrecht: Kluwer. pp. 141–182. doi:10.1007/978-94-015-8285-8_9. ISBN 978-90-481-4344-3.
- McCawley, James D. (1994). "Some Graphotactic Constraints". In Watt, William C. (ed.). Writing Systems and Cognition. Neuropsychology and Cognition. Vol. 6. Dordrecht: Kluwer. pp. 115–127. doi:10.1007/978-94-015-8285-8_7. ISBN 978-90-481-4344-3.
- Mencken, Henry L. (1936). The American Language: An Inquiry into the Development of English in the United States (4th ed.). New York: Alfred A. Knopf.
- Okrent, Arika (26 July 2021). Davies, Sally (ed.). "Why is the English spelling system so weird and inconsistent?". Aeon. Archived from the original on 20 January 2024.
- Rollings, Andrew G. (1998). "Marking devices in the spelling of English". Atlantis. 20 (1): 129–143. JSTOR 41055496.
- Rollings, Andrew G. (1999). "Markers in English and other orthographies". In Iglesias Rábade, L.; Nuñez Pertejo, P. (eds.). Estudios de lingüística contrastive (PDF). University of Santiago de Compostela. pp. 441–449. ISBN 978-84-8121-769-8.
- Rollings, Andrew G. (November 2003). "System and chaos in English spelling: The case of the voiceless palato-alveolar fricative". English Language and Linguistics. 7 (2). Cambridge University Press: 211–233. doi:10.1017/S1360674303001084. S2CID 123656286.
- Rollings, Andrew G. (2004). The Spelling Patterns of English. LINCOM Studies in English Linguistics. Vol. 4. Muenchen: LINCOM Europa. ISBN 978-3-89586-758-3.
- Sampson, Geoffrey (1985). Writing Systems: A Linguistic Introduction. London: Hutchinson.
- Seymour, Philip H. K.; Aro, Mikko; Erskine, Jane M. (2003). "Foundation literacy acquisition in European orthographies". British Journal of Psychology. 94 (2). Wiley: 143–174. doi:10.1348/000712603321661859. PMID 12803812. S2CID 9716179.
- Simpson, John A.; Weiner, Edmund S. C., eds. (1989). Oxford English Dictionary (2nd ed.). Oxford: Clarendon Press.
- Stamper, Kory (2017). Word by Word: The Secret Life of Dictionaries. Knopf Doubleday. ISBN 978-1-101-87094-5.
- Steinberg, Danny (1973). "Phonology, reading and Chomsky and Halle's optimal orthography". Journal of Psycholinguistic Research. 2 (3): 239–258. doi:10.1007/BF01067104. PMID 24197867. S2CID 27319198.
- Stubbs, Michael (1980). Language and literacy: The sociolinguistics of reading and writing. London: Routledge & Kegan Paul. ISBN 978-0-7100-0426-0.
- Upward, Christopher; Davidson, George (2011). The History of English Spelling. The Language Library. Wiley. ISBN 978-1-4051-9024-4.
- Van Assche, Eva; Duyck, Wouter; Hartsuiker, Robert J. (2013). "Phonological Recoding in Error Detection: A Cross-sectional Study in Beginning Readers of Dutch". PLOS ONE. 8 (12) e85111. Bibcode:2013PLoSO...885111V. doi:10.1371/journal.pone.0085111. PMC 3875550. PMID 24386453.
- Venezky, Richard L. (1967). "English orthography: Its graphical structure and its relation to sound". Reading Research Quarterly. 2 (3). International Literacy Association: 75–105. doi:10.2307/747031. JSTOR 747031. S2CID 144231215.
- Venezky, Richard L. (1970). The Structure of English Orthography. Janua Linguarum. Series Minor. The Hague: Mouton. doi:10.1515/9783110804478. ISBN 978-90-279-0707-3.
- Venezky, Richard L. (1976). "Notes on the history of English spelling". Visible Language. 10 (4): 351–365.
- Venezky, Richard L. (1999). The American Way of Spelling: The Structure and Origins of American English Orthography. New York: Guilford Press. ISBN 978-1-57230-469-7.
- Weir, Ruth H. (1967). "Some Thoughts on Spelling". In Austin, William M. (ed.). Papers in linguistics in honor of Léon Dostert. Janua Linguarum, Series Major. The Hague: Mouton. pp. 169–177. doi:10.1515/9783111675886-019. ISBN 978-3-11-167588-6.
- Wells, John C. (2008). Longman Pronunciation Dictionary (3rd ed.). Harlow: Pearson Education. ISBN 978-1-4058-8118-0.
- Wijk, Axel (1966). Rules of Pronunciation for the English Language: An Account of the Relationship Between English Spelling and Pronunciation. Language and Language Learning. Oxford University Press.
- Wolman, David (2008). Righting the Mother Tongue: From Olde English to Email, the Twisted Story of English Spelling. Collins. ISBN 978-0-06-136925-4.
