= The Chaos =

1920 poem written by Gerard Nolst Trenité

The Chaos
A reading of the poem (duration: 5:53)

"The Chaos" is a poem demonstrating the irregularity of English spelling and pronunciation. Written by Dutch writer, traveller, and teacher Gerard Nolst Trenité (1870–1946) under the pseudonym of Charivarius, it includes about 800 examples of irregular spelling. The first version of 146 lines of text appeared in an appendix to the author's 1920 textbook Drop Your Foreign Accent: engelsche uitspraakoefeningen, but "the most complete and authoritative version ever likely to emerge", published by the Spelling Society in 1993–94, has 274 lines.

== Partial text ==
These lines are set out as in the author's version, with alternate couplets indented and the problematic words italicised.

Dearest creature in Creation,
Studying English pronunciation,

I will teach you in my verse
Sounds like corpse, corps, horse and worse.

It will keep you, Susy, busy,
Make your head with heat grow dizzy;

Tear in eye your dress you'll tear.
So shall I! Oh, hear my prayer,

Pray, console your loving poet,
Make my coat look new, dear, sew it?

Just compare heart, beard and heard,
Dies and diet, lord and word,

Sword and sward, retain and Britain,
(Mind the latter, how it's written!)

Made has not the sound of bade,
Say—said, pay—paid, laid, but plaid.

Now I surely will not plague you
With such words as vague and ague,

But be careful how you speak,
Say break, steak, but bleak and streak,

Previous, precious; fuchsia, via;
Pipe, snipe, recipe and choir,

Cloven, oven; how and low;
Script, receipt; shoe, poem, toe,

Hear me say devoid of trickery,
daughter, laughter, and Terpsichore,

[...]

Finally: which rhymes with "enough,"
Though, through, plough, cough, hough, or tough?

Hiccough has the sound of "cup"......
My advice is—give it up!

== Dedication ==
A mimeographed version of the poem in Harry Cohen's possession is dedicated to "Miss Susanne Delacruix, Paris", who is thought to have been one of Nolst Trenité's students. The author addressed her as "dearest creature in creation" in the first line, and later as "Susy" in line 5.

== See also ==
- Ghoti
- "Lion-Eating Poet in the Stone Den"
- Orthography
- English orthography
- English spelling-to-sound correspondences
- Spelling reform
- List of reforms of the English language
- Shavian alphabet
