= Ghoti =

Creative re-spelling of the word "fish"

Ghoti is a creative English respelling of the word fish, used to illustrate irregularities in English spelling and pronunciation.

== Explanation ==
The word is intended to be pronounced in the same way as fish (/fɪʃ/), using these sounds:

- gh, pronounced /f/ as in enough /ɪˈnʌf/ or tough /tʌf/;
- o, pronounced /ɪ/ as in women /ˈwɪmɪn/;
- ti, pronounced /ʃ/ as in nation /ˈneɪʃən/ or motion /ˈmoʊʃən/.

The key to the phenomenon is that the pronunciations of the constructed word's three parts are inconsistent with how they would ordinarily be pronounced in those placements. To illustrate: gh can only resemble f when following the letters ou or au at the end of certain morphemes ("tough", "cough", "laugh"), while ti would only resemble sh when followed by a vowel sound. The expected pronunciation in English would sound like "goatee" /ˈɡoʊti/, not "fish".

Both of the digraphs in the spelling – gh and ti – are examples of consonant shifts, the gradual transformation of a consonant in a particular spoken context while retaining its identity in writing. Specifically, "nation" reflects the softening of t before io in late Latin and early French, while "enough" reflects the softening of a terminal g in West Germanic languages. In contrast, North Germanic languages such as Danish and Swedish retain a harder pronunciation in their corresponding words (nok and nog).

== History ==
The first confirmed use of ghoti is in a letter dated 11 December 1855 from Charles Ollier to Leigh Hunt. On the third page of the letter, Ollier explains that his son William, who was 31, had "hit upon a new method of spelling Fish." Ollier then demonstrates the rationale, "So that ghoti is fish." Ollier's work was contemporaneous with that of spelling reformer Alexander J. Ellis, whose Plea for Phonotypy and Phonography contained several similar examples.

An early known published reference is an October 1874 article by S. R. Townshend Mayer in St. James's Magazine, which cites the letter.

Another relatively early appearance of ghoti was in a 1937 newspaper article, and the term is alluded to in the 1939 James Joyce experimental work of fiction Finnegans Wake.

Ghoti is often cited to support English spelling reform, and is often attributed to George Bernard Shaw, a supporter of this cause. However, the word does not appear in Shaw's writings, and a biography of Shaw attributes it instead to an anonymous spelling reformer. Similar constructed words exist that demonstrate English idiosyncrasies, but ghoti is one of the most widely recognized.

== Notable usage ==
- In Finnegans Wake (published in 1939), James Joyce alludes to ghoti: "Gee each owe tea eye smells fish." ("G-H-O-T-I spells 'fish'.") (p. 299). On p. 51, that fishabed ghoatstory may also allude to ghoti.
- In the artistic language Klingon, ghotI’ /ɣoˈtʰɪʔ/ is the proper word for "fish".
- In "An Egg Grows in Gotham", a 1966 episode of the television series Batman, the villain Egghead uses "Ghoti Oeufs" as the name for his caviar business, and Batman explains the reference to Robin.
- Ghoti Hook is a 1990s Christian punk band.
- Ghoti has been used to test speech synthesizers. The Speech! allophone-based speech synthesizer software for the BBC Micro was tweaked to pronounce ghoti as fish. Examination of the code reveals the string GHOTI used to identify the special case.
- In the Yu-Gi-Oh! Trading Card Game, there is a series of Fish-Type cards called "Ghoti".
- The second track of Lupe Fiasco's 2022 album Drill Music in Zion is titled "Ghoti".
- Vocaloid producer NILFRUITS uses the line "ghoti, ghoti" in the transcript accompanying the sung lyrics of "fish, fish" in his 2018 song Hungry Nicole.

== See also ==
- English-language spelling reform
- English orthography
- English phonology
- "The Chaos", a poem which demonstrates the irregularity of English orthography
