= Gerard Nolst Trenité =

Dutch writer (1870–1946)

Dr. Gerard Nolst Trenité
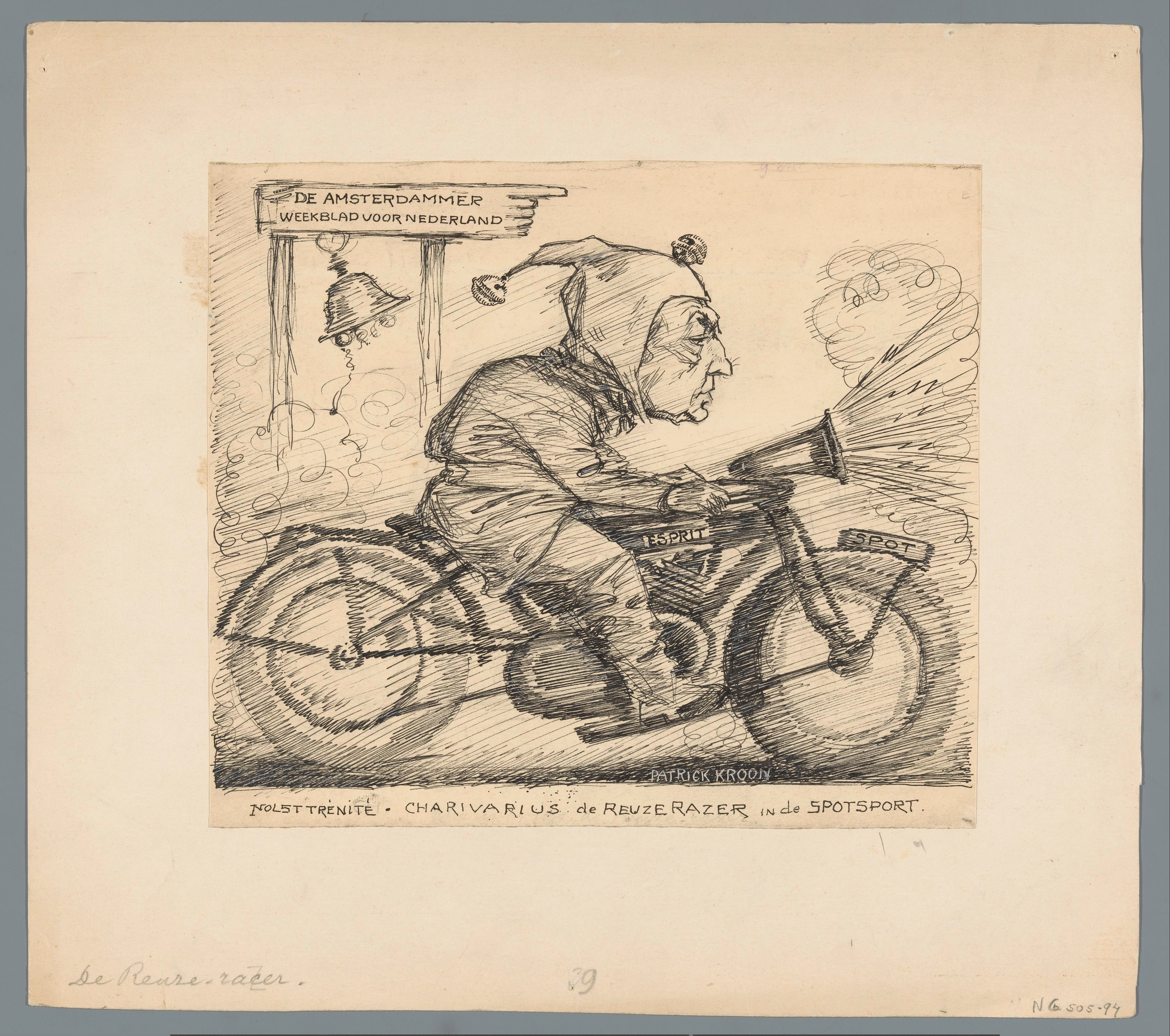
- Caricature of Nolst Trenité as a jester riding a motorcycle
- Born: 20 July 1870; Utrecht, Netherlands
- Died: 9 October 1946 (aged 76); Haarlem, Netherlands
- Citizenship: Netherlands
- Education: University of Utrecht
- Occupations: Writer; teacher; observer of English
- Writing career
- Pen name: Charivarius
- Language: Dutch, English
- Years active: 1903–1945
- Notable work: The Chaos

Gerard Nolst Trenité (Note: /ˌnoʊlst trɛniːˈteɪ/ NOHLST tren-ee-TAY) (Dutch: [ɣeːrɑrt nɔlst treːniteː]; 20 July 1870 – 9 October 1946), publishing under the pseudonym Charivarius, (Note: Dutch pronunciation: [ɕaːriˈvaːrijəs]) was a Dutch writer, teacher, and observer of the English language.

Nolst Trenité is best known in the English-speaking world for his poem The Chaos, which demonstrates many of the idiosyncrasies of English spelling and first appeared as an appendix to his 1920 textbook Drop Your Foreign Accent: engelsche uitspraakoefeningen. (Note: / ... ˈɛŋɡəlsə ˌeɪtsprɑːkˈuːfənɪŋən/) The subtitle of the book means "English pronunciation exercises". (Note: The subtitle has the pre-1947 Dutch spelling engelsche instead of the currently accepted usage engelse.)

Weakened from war and famine, Nolst Trenité died a year after the Liberation at the age of 76.

== Education ==
Nolst Trenité was the son of a Utrecht minister. After grammar school, he studied classical literature, law and political science at the University of Utrecht from 1890 to 1894, but did not complete any of these courses. Adventurous, he embarked on a self-promised trip around the world in 1894, which ended prematurely in San Francisco, where he became a home tutor for the children of the Dutch consul. Two years later he was back in the Netherlands and resumed his studies in political science, at the same time preparing for the qualification to teach English at secondary level; he obtained the relevant certificate in 1898. In 1901 he obtained his doctorate in political science at the University of Utrecht.

== Teacher ==
From 1900 to 1918, Trenité was, as he preferred to call himself, a teacher of English and civil engineering at a secondary school in Haarlem. His school books, The Nutshell. Shortest English grammar (1906), First Pictorial word book (1908) and Drop your foreign accent. Vocal gymnastics (1909), date from that period. His poem The Chaos, included in later editions of the latter book, intended as a practice material for English words Dutch speakers found difficult to pronounce, also became popular outside the Netherlands. It is known in England among the few who seek a spelling reform. In the field of constitutional law, he wrote The Constitution (1912).

== Charivarius ==
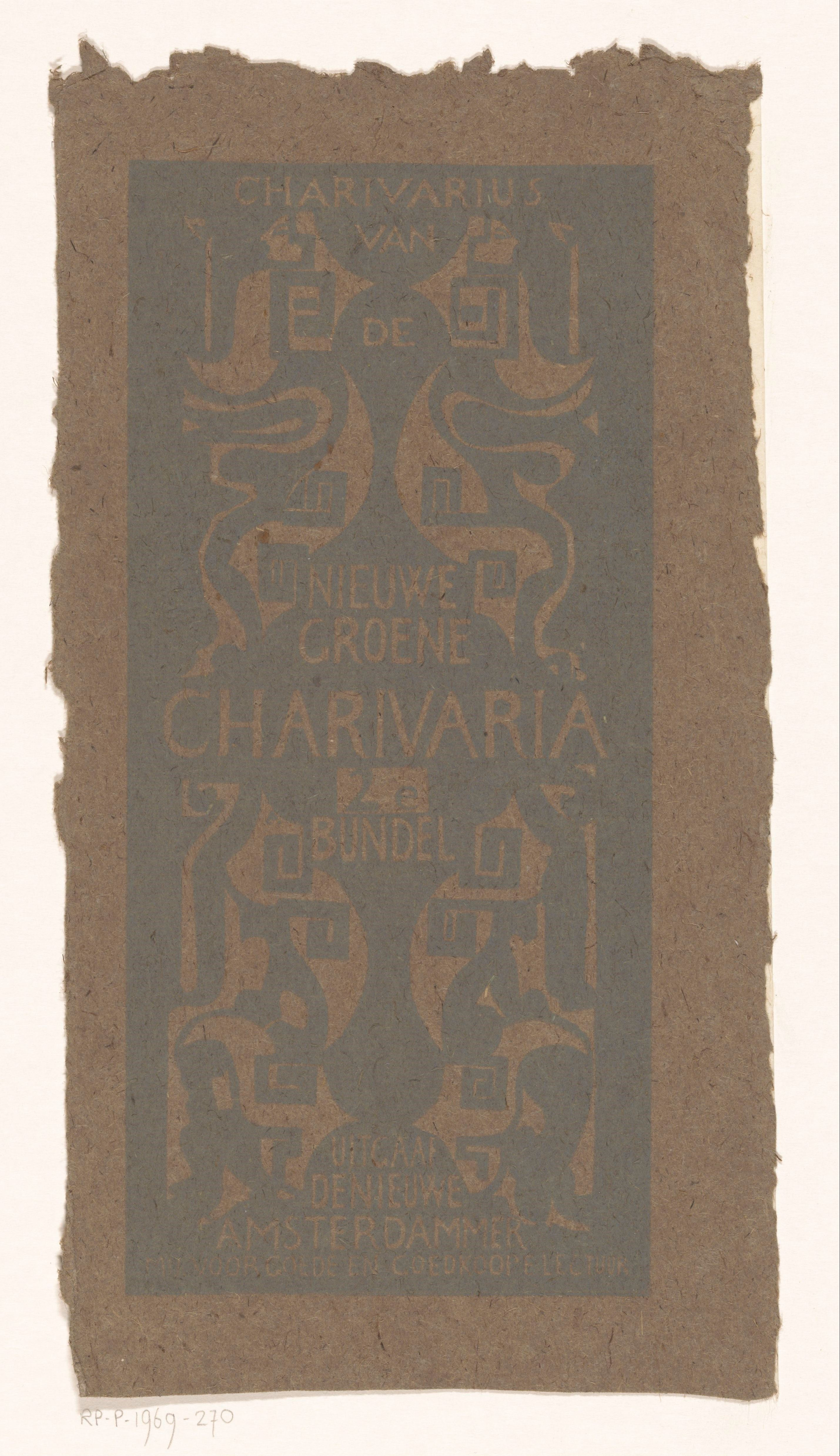
Charivaria (1916)

From 1903, Trenité wrote a language column for the weekly De Groene Amsterdammer, which had been published since 1877, under the name with which he acquired his fame: Charivarius, a pseudonym probably borrowed from the French satirical magazine Le Charivari (1832–1937) and its English counterpart, Punch, or the London Charivari (1841–1992); the French word charivari stands for a carnivalesque procession with noise and kettle music.

The Charivarius section was continued by Nolst Trenité until De Groene was banned by the occupying forces in 1940. Three anthologies — Charivari (1913) and Charivaria (1915 and 1916) — have been published, as well as five collections under the name Ruize-rijmen (1914-1918), from which an anthology was compiled in 1922, also under the title Ruize-rijmen. His book Is that good Dutch? (Amsterdam, 1940) is one of the best-known language advice books: it reached ten editions and was reprinted in a facsimile in 1998.

The column consisted partly of ironic and sometimes cynical rhymes (especially those about the bloodshed of the First World War), partly of an ironic approach to language derailments that Charivarius identified in various publications. Later he went on about running text, citing many examples of errors. He gave colorful names to certain mistakes. For example, a succession of short sentences was called panting style, and he coined the names "Fnaffers" and "Fnuiters" for people who redundantly used the Dutch words "vanaf" and "vanuit" ("from off" and "from out") instead of the more simple "van" ("from").

== The Chaos ==
The Chaos
A reading of the poem (duration: 5:53)

"The Chaos" is a poem demonstrating the irregularity of English spelling and pronunciation. It includes about 800 examples of irregular spelling. The first version of 146 lines of text appeared in an appendix to the author's 1920 textbook Drop Your Foreign Accent: engelsche uitspraakoefeningen, but "the most complete and authoritative version ever likely to emerge", published by the Spelling Society in 1993–94, has 274 lines.

== Aunt Betje ==
The most famous term attributed to Charivarius is the "aunt betje". This is an inversion error, which occurs with compound sentences (after coordinating conjunctions such as and, because, or but). Traditionally, in Dutch the order subject-verb must be the same in both sentences.

Charivarius seems to have mentioned the term by name for the first time in his weekly language column in the De (Groene) Amsterdammer. Although some sources place the name in 1940 or 1918, the oldest site is 22 June 1913. Charivarius then writes:

"Aunt Betje — why should we keep the name of our old friend silent? – now has again in the NR Ct. written"

("Tante Betje – waartoe zouden wij den naam van onze oude vriendin verzwijgen? – heeft nu weder in de N. R. Ct. geschreven")

Although Charivarius refers here to 'an old friend', and elsewhere states that he named the mistake after an elderly Aunt Betje, the general assumption is that a real Aunt Betje never existed.

== Criticism ==
As popular as Charivarius was among Dutch people, he was hardly taken seriously. For example, linguist Gerlach Royen (cited in Taalrhapsody, Bussum, 1953) wrote:

Language enthusiasts who think they have to medicate on sentences such as: "A multitude of people were on their feet" — there are such language doctors walking around in droves — those language buffs have no idea that the high-profile congregation without grammar has much finer shades of language, than that which schoolmasters test by grammar logic. From Charivariuses and associates deliver us, Lord!

== Stage ==
He was also very interested in the stage. In 1912 he founded the Haarlemsche Tooneel Club with boys' book writer JB Schuil ("Declared Death", "De katjangs", "De AFC-ers") who played pieces written or arranged by him. Not infrequently he also composed the matching music. The story goes that he also took on many roles himself, although he rarely stuck to his own text. That was the author's personal freedom, he would say.

== Bibliography ==
Drop your foreign accent (1932)

Ruize-rijmen (1922)

=== Linguistic ===
- Charivari. Amsterdam: Van Holkema & Warendorf, 1913.
- Charivaria. 2e bundel. s.l.: De Nieuwe Amsterdammer, 1915.
- Charivaria. Derde bundel. Haarlem: H.D. Tjeenk Willink & Zoon, 1916.
- Is dat goed Nederlands? Amsterdam, De Spieghel, 1940 (10e druk, Amsterdam: Van der Peet, 1953; facsimile-editie, Den Haag: SDU, 1998).
- Een ander woord. Nederlandse synoniemen en zinverwante woorden. 's-Gravenhage: Van Goor, 1945.

=== Lyrics ===
- Ruize-rijmen. Amsterdam: De Nieuwe Amsterdammer, 1914 (dl. 2 1915, dl. 3 1916, dl. 4 1917, dl. 5 1918); eerste gezamenlijke druk 1922, vierde en laatste 1935.
- De roemruchte bedrijven van Ridder Don Quixote de la Mancha. Haarlem: Tjeenk Willink, 1925.
- Het scheepsjournaal van de Ark door Noach. Met hieroglyphen door Cham, opgegraven door I.L. Gordon en A.J. Fruen losbandig bewerkt. Amsterdam: Van Kampen, [1925].
- Onze evendieren. Karakterstudies. Met ruize-rijmen van Charivarius. Amsterdam: Van Holkema & Warendorf, 1926.
- Herscheppingen, vrij naar Ovidius, Haarlem: Tjeenk Willink, 1926.
- De geschiedenis des vaderlands tot den dood van Karel V. Haarlem: Tjeenk Willink. 1927.
- De geschiedenis des vaderlands. Het voorspel van den Tachtigjarigen oorlog. Haarlem: Tjeenk Willink, 1929.
- Klusjes en kliekjes naar Schopenhauer. Haarlem: Tjeenk Willink, 1930.
- Godengesprekken naar Lucianus. Haarlem: Tjeenk Willink, 1932.
- Het einde van Socrates. Haarlem: Tjeenk Willink, 1934.
- Odysseus. Vrije bewerking van Homerus' Odyssee in berijmd proza. Haarlem: Tjeenk Willink, 1935.
- De slimheidskampioen. Oud-Egyptisch dievenverhaal naar Herodotus. Amsterdam: De Spieghel, [1942].

=== Stage ===
- Het nieuwe systeem. Spel van de school in 3 bedrijven. Haarlem: Tjeenk Willink, 1911.
- De storm. (Shakespeare's Tempest). Losbandig bewerkt in 5 bedrijven met proloog en coupletten. Haarlem: Tjeenk Willink, 1913.
- Zaïre. Vrij bewerkt naar Voltaire. Haarlem: Tjeenk Willink, 1915.
- Hoe het weeuwtje uit het Hof van Holland gevrijd werd. Tooneelschets in vier tafereelen naar de novelle van Potgieter vrij bewerkt. Haarlem: Tjeenk Willink, 1919.
- De armband. Vrij naar het Engelsch van Alfred Sutro. Haarlem: Tjeenk Willink, 1920.
- Pak-idylle. Klucht in één bedrijf. Vrij bewerkt naar het Engels van Grattan. Den Haag: uitgever niet genoemd, 1922.
- Rondom de kroningslinde. Nationaal tafereel in één bedrijf (Naar aanleiding van het regeringsjubileum van Koningin Wilhelmina). Amsterdam: De Amsterdammer, 1923.
- Drie oorspronkelijke éénspelbedrijven (Een droom. De schim of het rose japonnetje. De echtelieden). Haarlem: Tjeenk Willink, [1926].
- De appel van Eris. Mythologische klucht in een bedrijf. Haarlem: Tjeenk Willink, 1935.
- Esmoreit, een abel spel. Vertaald [uit het Middelnederlands]. Haarlem: Tjeenk Willink, 1938.
- Buiten werken, toneelschets in één bedrijf. 1931

=== Textbooks ===
- The Nutshell. Shortest English grammar. Haarlem: Tjeenk Willink, 1906.
- First pictorial wordbook (illustrations). Haarlem: Tjeenk Willink, 1908.
- First pictorial wordbook (exercises). Haarlem: Tjeenk Willink, 1908.
- Guck, so weisst du's. Bilder, Wörter und Sätze. Haarlem: Tjeenk Willink, 1908.
- Drop your foreign accent. Vocal gymnastics. Haarlem: Tjeenk Willink, 1909.
- Je vois tout. Images, mots et exercices. Méthode directe pour la langue française. Haarlem: Tjeenk Willink, 1909.
- Vedere è imparare. Incisioni, vocabolario ed esercizi. Haarlem: Tjeenk Willink, 1932.
