= ConScript Unicode Registry =

Encoding of artificial scripts

The ConScript Unicode Registry is a volunteer project to coordinate the assignment of code points in the Unicode Private Use Areas (PUA) for the encoding of artificial scripts, such as those for constructed languages. It was founded by John Cowan and was maintained by him and Michael Everson. It is not affiliated with the Unicode Consortium.

== History ==
The ConScript Unicode Registry is a volunteer project that was founded by John Cowan in the early 1990s. It is a joint project of John Cowan and Michael Everson.

Historically, it was hosted on both Cowan and Everson's websites (branded as the North American and European sites, respectively); in 2002, the site was transitioned to be hosted exclusively on Everson's site.

Since 2008, the ConScript Unicode Registry has been largely unmaintained; in 2008, Cowan explained that Everson was too busy to continue maintaining the project. Due to this inactivity, Rebecca Bettencourt founded the Under-ConScript Unicode Registry, aiming to coordinate code points for constructed languages until they can be formally added to the ConScript Unicode Registry. Scripts added to the Under-ConScript Unicode Registry include Sitelen Pona (for Toki Pona) and Cirth.

== Scripts ==
The CSUR and UCSUR include the following scripts:

Withdrawn
Allocated only in the UCSUR

Scripts in the ConScript Unicode Registry and Under-ConScript Unicode Registry
Writing system	Creator(s)	Code range	Notes
Aiha	Ursula K. Le Guin	F8A0–F8CF	
Alzetjan	Herman Miller	E550–E57F	
Amlin	Marnanel Thurman	E6D0−E6EF	
Amman-Iar	David Bell	E2A0–E2CF	
Ath	Morioka Hiroyuki	F4C0−F4EF	
aUI	John W. Weilgart	E280–E29F	
Aurebesh	Stephen Crane	E890−E8DF	
Braille	Louis Braille	EB60−EB9F	The Braille Extended block includes all permutations of all Braille patterns as specified in the original 1829 specification, but not otherwise encoded in the Braille Patterns Unicode block.
Cirth	J. R. R. Tolkien	E080–E0FF	Unicode proposal made in September 1997; No action taken but Cirth appears in the Roadmap to the SMP
Cistercian numerals		EBA0−EBDF	Background information was provided to Unicode in 2020. Any Unicode proposal for Cistercian numerals would need to demonstrate that the numerals are interchanged as plain text.
Cylenian	Danae Dekker	EC00−EC2F	
Deini	Dana Nutter	ED00−ED3F	
Derani	Hoemaı	F16B0−F16DF	
Deseret	George D. Watt	E830–E88F	Withdrawn after inclusion in Unicode. Use the corresponding Unicode block (U+10400–U+1044F).
D'ni	Richard A. Watson	E830−E88F	
Engsvanyáli	M. A. R. Barker	E100–E14F	
Ewellic	Doug Ewell	E680–E6CF	
Ferengi	Timothy Miller	E600–E62F	
Gargoyle	Herman Miller	E5C0–E5DF	
Glaitha-A	Rebecca G. Bettencourt	E900−E97F	
Glaitha-B	Rebecca G. Bettencourt	E980−E9FF	
Graflect	Aaron Paterson	EC70−ECEF	
Grawlixes	Mort Walker	EDF0−EDFF	
Ilianore	Jeff Smith	E1B0–E1CF	
Iranic	Ali Hossein Mohammadi	ED80−EDAF	
Kazat ?Akkorou	Herman Miller	E430–E44F	
Kazvarad	Herman Miller	E450–E46F	
Kelwathi	Herman Miller	E4F0–E4FF	
Kinya	Maurizio M. Gavoli	E150–E1AF	
Kinya Syllables	Maurizio M. Gavoli	F0000–F0E6F	
Klingon	Astra Image Corporation	F8D0–F8FF	Unicode proposal made in 1997; Formally rejected by Unicode in 2001
Lapointe Hexadecimal Numerals	Boby Lapointe	EBE0−EBEF	
Lhenazi	Arthaey Angosii	EA00−EA9F	
Martin Hexadecimal Numerals	Bruce Alan Martin	EBF0−EBFF	
Mizarian	Herman Miller	E300–E33F	
Monofon	Steve T. Bell	E800–E82F	
Niji	Norbert Lindenberg	ED40−ED7F	
Nísklôz	Herman Miller	E400–E42F	
Night Writing	Charles Barbier	F16E0–F16FF	The Braille Supplemental block includes Night Writing dot patterns not otherwise encoded in the Braille Patterns Unicode block.
Olaetyan	Herman Miller	E3B0–E3FF	
Ophidian		E5E0–E5FF	
Orokin	Digital Extremes	EB00−EB3F	
Phaistos Disc		E6D0–E6FF	Withdrawn after inclusion in Unicode. Use the corresponding Unicode block (U+101D0–U+101FF).
Pikto	John E. Williams	F0E70–F16A4	
Røzhxh	Herman Miller	E490–E4BF	
Rynnan	Herman Miller	E520–E54F	
Sadalian	Wong Sadale Cho Ching	F2000−F267F	
Saklor	Herman Miller	E500–E51F	
Sarkai	Herman Miller	E360–E37F	
Serivelna	Herman Miller	E4C0–E4EF	
Seussian Latin Extensions	Theodor Geisel	E630–E64F	
Semtog	George Sutton, Martin Novy	F1700−F18FF	
Shavian	Ronald Kingsley Read	E700–E72F	Withdrawn after inclusion in Unicode. Use the corresponding Unicode block (U+10450–U+1047F).
Shidinn	Quefei Huang	F1B00−F1C3F	
Sitelen Pona	Sonja Lang	F1900−F19FF	
Sitelen Pona Radicals	Sonja Lang et al.	F1C80−F1C9F	
Solresol	Jean François Sudre	E770–E77F	
Ssûraki	Herman Miller	E5A0–E5BF	
Standard Galactic	Tom Hall	EB40−EB5F	
Streich	Tommaso Donnarumma	E2D0–E2DF	
Syai	Brian Lilburn	E1D0–E1FF	
Sylabitsa	Marcin Kowalczyk	E650−E67F	
Syrrin	Danae Dekker	EC30−EC6F	
Tassarunese	Narylis	EDB0−EDDF	
Telarasso	Herman Miller	E580–E59F	
Tengwar	J. R. R. Tolkien	E000–E07F	Unicode proposal made in September 1997. No action taken but Tengwar appears in the Roadmap to the SMP.
Thelwik	Herman Miller	E380–E3AF	
Titi Pula	Ðoom Epictooþ	F1C40−F1C7F	
Tonal	John W. Nystrom	E8E0−E8FF	
Unifon	John Malone	E740–E76F	In UCSUR, the block Unifon Extended was added in the code range U+E6F0–U+E73F.
Verdurian	Mark Rosenfelder	E200–E26F	
Visible Speech	Alexander Melville Bell	E780–E7FF	
Wanya	Max Dominik Weber	EAA0−EAFF	
Whitaker Hexadecimal Numerals	Ronald O. Whitaker	ECF0–ECFF	
Xaîni	Paul Blake	E2E0–E2FF	
Zarkhánd	Herman Miller	E470–E48F	
Zbalermorna	la kmir	F28A0−F28DF	
Zese	Jack Eisenmann	EDE0−EDEF	
Zírí:Nka	Herman Miller	E340–E35F	

== Font support ==
Some fonts support ConScript Unicode specified code points:

- Constructium, a proportional font based on SIL Gentium
- Fairfax, a monospaced font family intended for text editors and terminals
- GNU Unifont, a bitmap font intended as a fallback font, includes CSUR and UCSUR characters in the separate Unifont CSUR package
- Horta
- Kurinto Font Folio
- Nishiki-teki
- Quivira

== See also ==
- Medieval Unicode Font Initiative
