= Shavian (disambiguation) =

Shavian is a proposed phonemic alphabet for English.

Shavian may also refer to:

- Shavian (Unicode block), the Unicode character set block for the phonemic alphabet
- Shavian (horse), a British racehorse
- Shavian, associated with George Bernard Shaw
