= Deseret (Unicode block) =

- Range: U+10400..U+1044F (80 code points)
- Plane: SMP
- Scripts: Deseret
- Major alphabets: Deseret English
- Assigned: 80 code points
- Unused: 0 reserved code points
- Source standards: ConScript Unicode Registry

Unicode version history
- 3.1 (2001): 76 (+76)
- 4.0 (2003): 80 (+4)

Unicode documentation
- Code chart ∣ Web page

Deseret (/ˌdɛzəˈrɛt/) is a Unicode block containing characters in the Deseret alphabet, which were invented by the Church of Jesus Christ of Latter-day Saints (LDS Church) to write English. The Deseret block was derived from an earlier private use encoding in the ConScript Unicode Registry, like the Shavian and Phaistos Disc encodings. The block was added in version 3.1 of the Unicode Standard; the letters Oi and Ew, both uppercase and lowercase, were added in version 4.0.

Deseret^{[1]} Official Unicode Consortium code chart (PDF)
	0	1	2	3	4	5	6	7	8	9	A	B	C	D	E	F
U+1040x	𐐀	𐐁	𐐂	𐐃	𐐄	𐐅	𐐆	𐐇	𐐈	𐐉	𐐊	𐐋	𐐌	𐐍	𐐎	𐐏
U+1041x	𐐐	𐐑	𐐒	𐐓	𐐔	𐐕	𐐖	𐐗	𐐘	𐐙	𐐚	𐐛	𐐜	𐐝	𐐞	𐐟
U+1042x	𐐠	𐐡	𐐢	𐐣	𐐤	𐐥	𐐦	𐐧	𐐨	𐐩	𐐪	𐐫	𐐬	𐐭	𐐮	𐐯
U+1043x	𐐰	𐐱	𐐲	𐐳	𐐴	𐐵	𐐶	𐐷	𐐸	𐐹	𐐺	𐐻	𐐼	𐐽	𐐾	𐐿
U+1044x	𐑀	𐑁	𐑂	𐑃	𐑄	𐑅	𐑆	𐑇	𐑈	𐑉	𐑊	𐑋	𐑌	𐑍	𐑎	𐑏
Notes 1.As of Unicode version 17.0

== History ==
The following Unicode-related documents record the purpose and process of defining specific characters in the Deseret block:

Version	Final code points (Note: Proposed code points and characters names may differ from final code points and names)	Count	L2 ID	WG2 ID	Document
3.1	U+10400..10425, 10428..1044D	76	X3L2/96-104		Jenkins, John H. (1996-11-08), Proposal for encoding the Deseret Alphabet in ISO/IEC 10646
3.1	U+10400..10425, 10428..1044D	76	X3L2/96-123		Aliprand, Joan; Winkler, Arnold (1996-12-18), "4.1 Deseret alphabet", Preliminary Minutes - UTC #71 & X3L2 #168 ad hoc meeting, San Diego - December 5-6, 1996
3.1	U+10400..10425, 10428..1044D	76		N1498	Jenkins, John (1997-01-20), Proposal for Encoding Deseret Alphabet
3.1	U+10400..10425, 10428..1044D	76	L2/97-030	N1503 (pdf, doc)	Umamaheswaran, V. S.; Ksar, Mike (1997-04-01), "8.9", Unconfirmed Minutes of WG 2 Meeting #32, Singapore; 1997-01-20--24
3.1	U+10400..10425, 10428..1044D	76	L2/99-019	N1891	Everson, Michael (1998-10-16), On encoding the Deseret script in Plane 1 of the UCS
3.1	U+10400..10425, 10428..1044D	76		N1891R	Everson, Michael (1999-01-23), On encoding the Deseret script in Plane 1 of the UCS
4.0	U+10426..10427, 1044E..1044F	4	L2/02-169	N2474	Beesley, Kenneth (2002-04-25), Proposal to Modify the Encoding of Deseret
4.0	U+10426..10427, 1044E..1044F	4	L2/02-218	N2473	Proposal to Add Two Deseret Alphabet Letters to ISO/IEC 10646, 2002-05-17
4.0	U+10426..10427, 1044E..1044F	4	L2/02-166R2		Moore, Lisa (2002-08-09), "Scripts and New Characters - Deseret", UTC #91 Minutes
