= Featural writing system =

Proposed type of writing system

In a featural writing system, the shapes of the symbols (such as letters) are not arbitrary but encode phonological features of the phonemes that they represent. The term featural was introduced by Geoffrey Sampson to describe the Korean alphabet and Pitman shorthand.

Joe Martin introduced the term featural notation to describe writing systems that include symbols to represent individual features rather than phonemes. He asserts that "alphabets have no symbols for anything smaller than a phoneme".

A featural script represents finer detail than an alphabet. Here, symbols do not represent whole phonemes, but rather the elements (features) that make up the phonemes, such as voicing or its place of articulation. In the Korean alphabet, the featural symbols are combined into alphabetic letters, and these letters are in turn joined into syllabic blocks, so the system combines three levels of phonological representation.

Some scholars (e.g. John DeFrancis) reject this class or at least labeling the Korean alphabet as such. Other featural writing systems include stenographies and constructed scripts of hobbyists and fiction writers (such as Tengwar), many of which feature advanced graphic designs corresponding to phonologic properties. It has been shown that even the Latin script has sub-character "features".

== Examples of featural systems ==
This is a small list of examples of featural writing systems by date of creation. The languages for which each system was developed are also shown.

=== 15th century ===
- Hangul – Korean

=== 19th century ===
- Canadian Aboriginal syllabics – several Algonquian, Eskimo-Aleut and Athabaskan languages
- Gregg shorthand – many languages from different families
- Duployan shorthand – originally French, later English, German, Spanish, Romanian, Chinook Jargon and others
- Visible Speech (a phonetic script) – no specific language. Developed to aid the deaf and teach them to speak aloud
- Deseret alphabet - phonetic script used to write English by The Church of Jesus Christ of Latter-day Saints. Vowels and voicing pairs of consonants are similar in shape.

=== 20th century ===
- Shavian alphabet, Quikscript – English
- Tengwar (an artificial script invented by J. R. R. Tolkien) – fictional languages from Tolkien's novels; Tolkien's invented languages and English
- SignWriting – sign languages; featural notation
- Mandombe – several Bantu languages

=== 21st century ===
- Ditema tsa Dinoko / Isibheqe Sohlamvu – Sotho and other Southern Bantu languages

== Semi-featural systems ==
Other scripts may have limited featural elements. Many languages written in the Latin alphabet make use of diacritics, and those letters using diacritics are sometimes considered separate letters within the language's alphabet. The Polish alphabet, for example, indicates a palatal articulation of some consonants with an acute accent. The International Phonetic Alphabet (IPA) also has some featural elements, for example in the hooks and tails that are characteristic of implosives, ɓ ɗ ʄ ɠ ʛ, and retroflex consonants, ʈ ɖ ʂ ʐ ɳ ɻ ɽ ɭ. The IPA diacritics are also featural.

The Turkish alphabet uses the presence of one or two dots above a vowel to indicate that it is a front vowel. The Japanese kana syllabaries indicate voiced consonants with marks known as dakuten. The Fraser alphabet used for Lisu rotates the letters for the tenuis consonants ꓑ /p/, ꓔ /t/, ꓝ /ts/, ꓚ /tʃ/, and ꓗ /k/ 180° to indicate aspiration.

== See also ==
- Abugida
- Abjad
- Syllabary
