= Sitelen Pona =

Constructed logography used for Toki Pona

Sitelen Pona sitelen pona
- "sitelen pona" in Sitelen Pona
- Script type: Logographic
- Creator: Sonja Lang
- Created: c. 2013
- Published: 2014
- Direction: Left-to-right, right-to-left script, vertical writing, mirror writing
- Languages: Toki Pona

Sitelen Pona (rendered in lowercase as sitelen pona, lit. 'good/simple writing', Toki Pona pronunciation: [ˈsitelen ˈpona]), also known as Toki Pona hieroglyphs, is a constructed logography used for Toki Pona. It was originally designed circa 2013 and published in 2014 by Canadian translator Sonja Lang, the language's creator.

== History ==
Sitelen Pona was designed by Lang in preparation for her upcoming Toki Pona textbook release. In 2013, she published a page listing 20 characters as a sample of the book's contents. The book, Toki Pona: The Language of Good, was published in 2014, and it included the first full description of Sitelen Pona in a dedicated section.

In 2021, Lang declared Sitelen Pona public domain.

In 2024, Lang published The Wonderful Wizard of Oz (Toki Pona edition), the first in the su series of illustrated storybooks aimed at beginners, in which all Toki Pona text is written in sitelen pona. This was the first published book that used sitelen pona as a primary script.

In 2025, around twenty members, including Lang, founded the Sitelen Pona Publishers and Typographers Association to represent the interests of publishers and fontmakers who use the script. The association also collaborated with other groups, including the Unicode Consortium, for the script's technical standardization.

In 2026, the Sitelen Pona Publishers and Typographers Association released the Common Sitelen Pona standard (Toki Pona: sitelen pona kulupu, lit. 'communal good/simple writing'), which defines a set of common-use characters and various methods of encoding them for fonts.

== Overview ==
Sitelen Pona is typically written left-to-right, top-to-bottom. As a logography, each word is written with a single grapheme. Many of the characters are derived from translingual and universal symbols such as pictograms, road signs, mathematical symbols, and emoticons. They have been described as "mostly easy to recognize, quick to remember and simple enough that even a child could draw them".

A head followed by a single modifier (e.g. a noun followed by an adjective) may be combined into one character by stacking the modifier grapheme above the head grapheme, or by nesting the modifier grapheme inside the head grapheme if there is space. The symbol of the language – – is written this way, with the grapheme (pona) nested inside the grapheme (toki).

=== Names ===
The sentence "ma Kanata li suli" written in Sitelen Pona. The name Kanata is spelled with the characters kasi alasa nasin awen telo a. The sentence translates to 'Canada is large'.

Names are written by enclosing multiple characters in a cartouche shaped like a rounded rectangle. Each character inside represents the first phoneme (or, equivalently, letter) of its word. The specific characters used in a name may be chosen creatively to convey meaning about its subject.

In an alternative system called nasin sitelen kalama, characters inside a cartouche can be followed by interpuncts or dots, where each interpunct represents the next mora of the word, and a colon represents all morae of the word.

=== Punctuation ===
Sitelen Pona punctuation is unstandardized and thus highly variable, as The Language of Good features only the cartouche. As a result, some texts use no punctuation at all, instead relying on formatting and context.

Sentence boundaries are typically marked with an interpunct, period, line break, or a wide space. Question marks and exclamation marks are often proscribed due to their similarity to the characters for the words seme and o or a, respectively.

Where quotation marks are used, CJK-style corner brackets (「...」) and double high quotation marks (“...” or "...") are most common.

== Characters ==
The original English edition of Lang's book Toki Pona: The Language of Good introduces 120 logographic characters, one for each of the core words taught in the book.

a

akesi

ala

alasa

ale / ali

anpa

ante

anu

awen

e

en

esun

ijo

ike

ilo

insa

jaki

jan

jelo

jo

kala

kalama

kama

kasi

ken

kepeken

kili

kiwen

ko

kon

kule

kulupu

kute

la

lape

laso

lawa

len

lete

li

lili

linja

lipu

loje

lon

luka

lukin

lupa

ma

mama

mani

meli

mi

mije

moku

moli

monsi

mu

mun

musi

mute

nanpa

nasa

nasin

nena

ni

nimi

noka

o

olin

ona

open

pakala

pali

palisa

pan

pana

pi

pilin

pimeja

pini

pipi

poka

poki

pona

pu

sama

seli

selo

seme

sewi

sijelo

sike

sin

sina

sinpin

sitelen

sona

soweli

suli

suno

supa

suwi

tan

taso

tawa

telo

tenpo

toki

tomo

tu

unpa

uta

utala

walo

wan

waso

wawa

weka

wile

The 2022 Esperanto edition of the same book (Tokipono: La lingvo de bono) includes alternative ways to write three words.

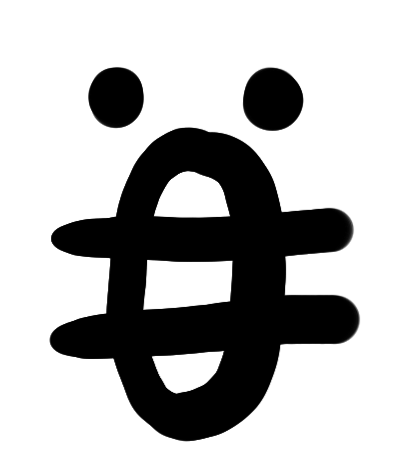
akesi
(Note: Four-legged (two-leg-stroke) form of akesi)

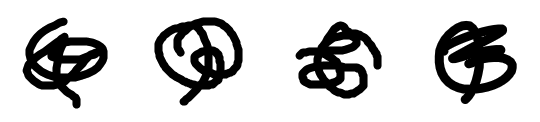
jaki
(Note: Clarifying that jaki can be written as an infinite variety of scribbles)

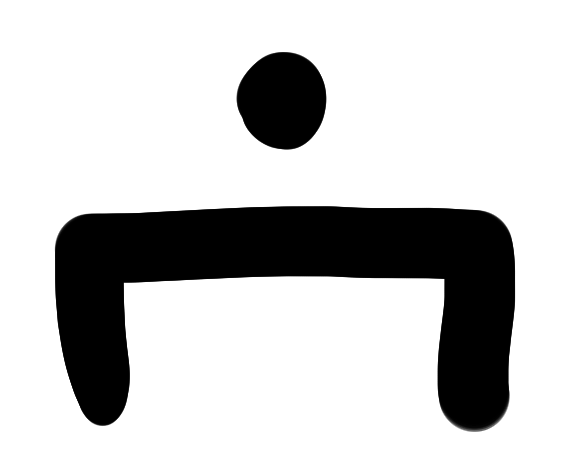
sewi
(Note: Secular form of sewi (above, holy) that isn't based on the Arabic word for God, analogous to the character for anpa (below, humble) and other location words)

The same edition presents characters for the 17 additional words spotlighted as "essential" in Toki Pona Dictionary (nimi ku suli). According to the accompanying text, these were the most commonly used characters for those words as of 2022, but there were still disagreements in the speaking community, and the following characters might be subject to change based on future community consensus.

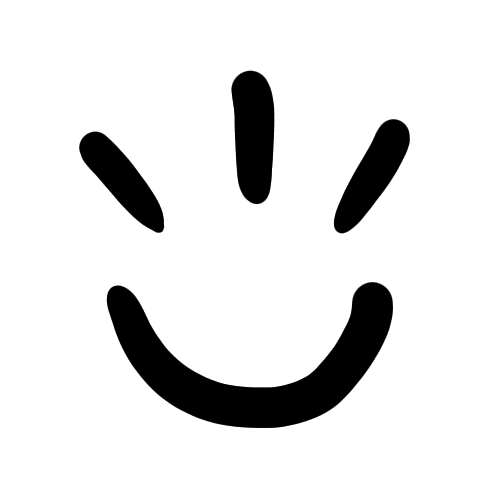
epiku

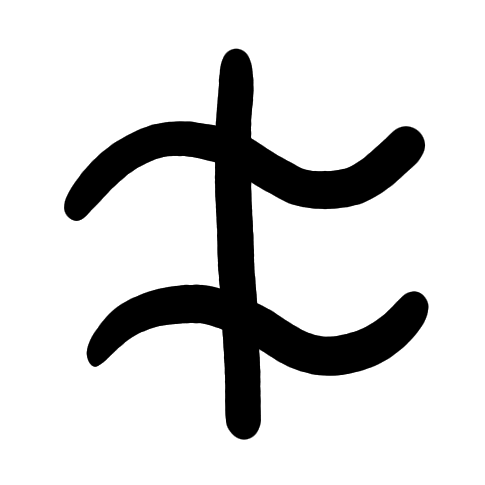
jasima

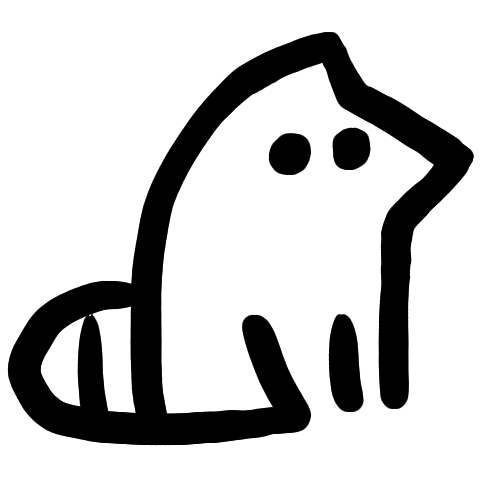
kijetesantakalu

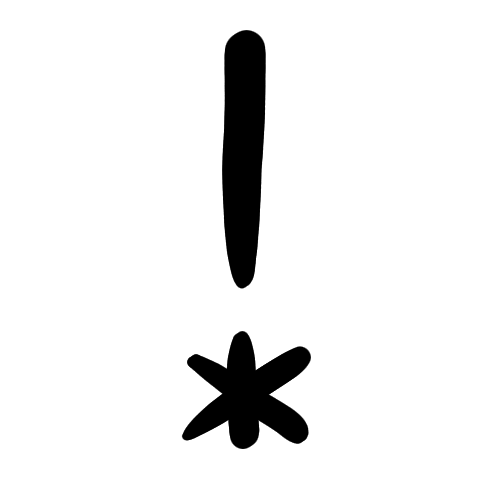
kin

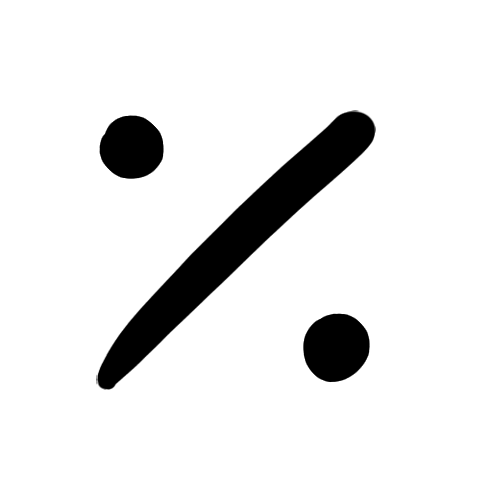
kipisi

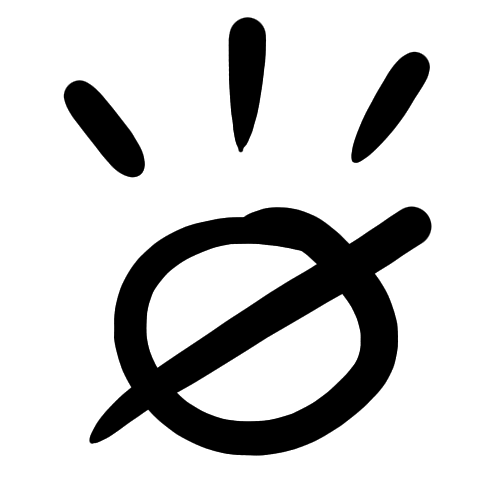
kokosila

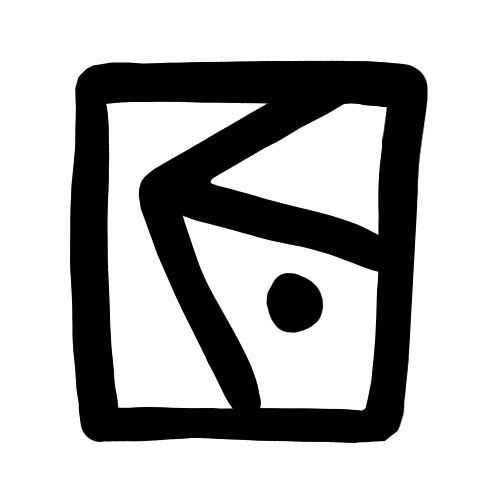
ku

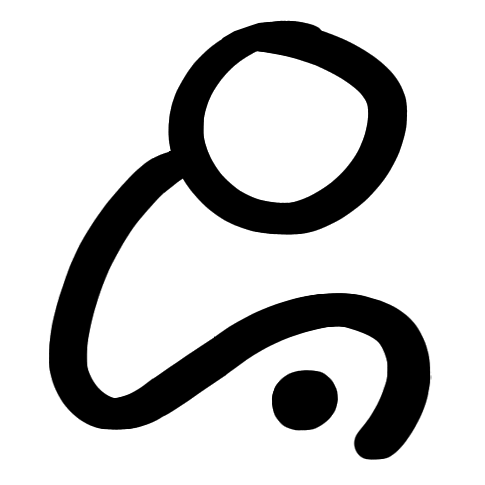
lanpan

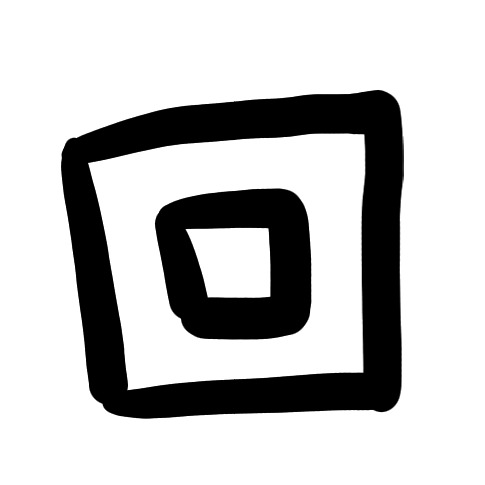
leko

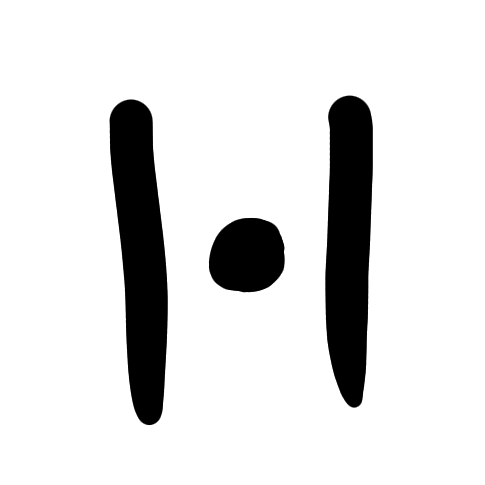
meso

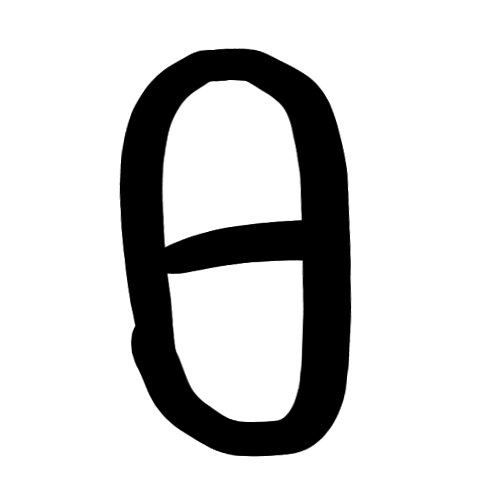
misikeke

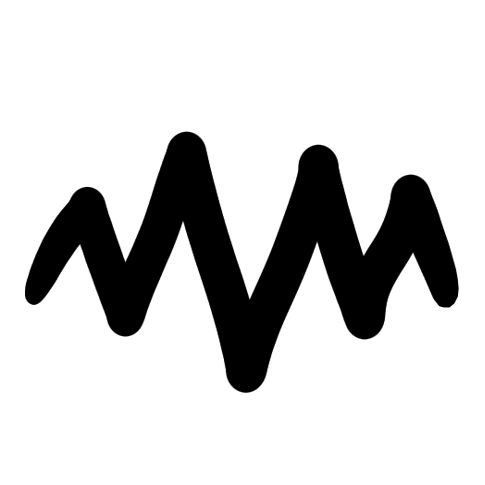
monsuta

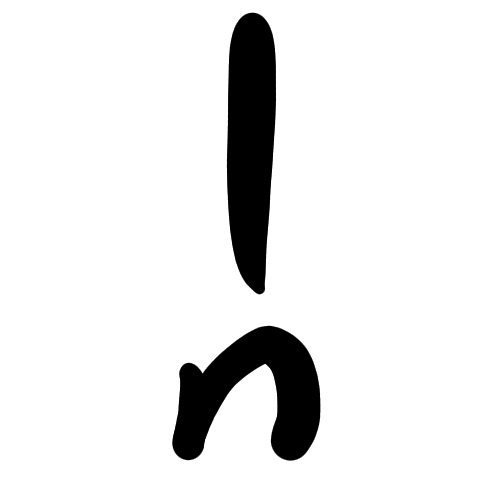
n

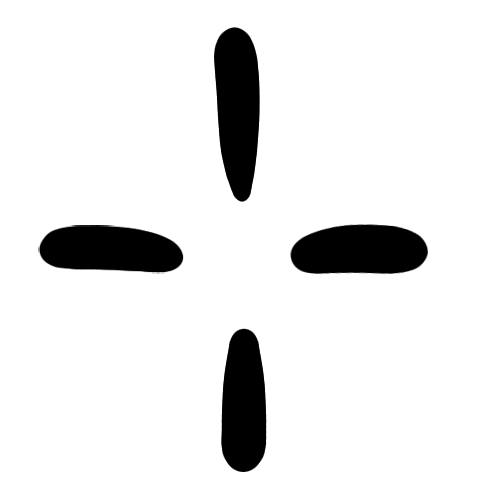
namako
(Note: sin-based variant of namako created by the community in 2016)

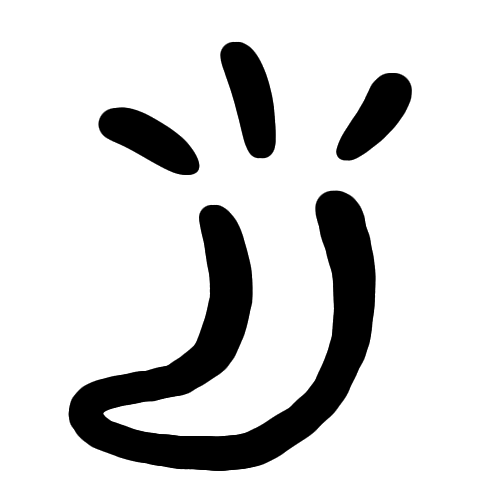
namako
(Note: Chili pepper variant of namako designed by Sonja Lang for personal use and first shared publicly in 2022)

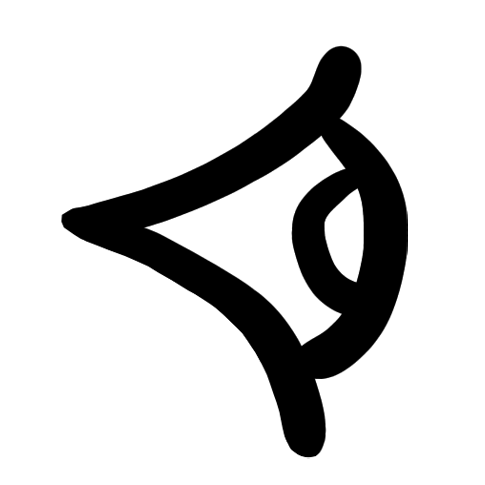
oko

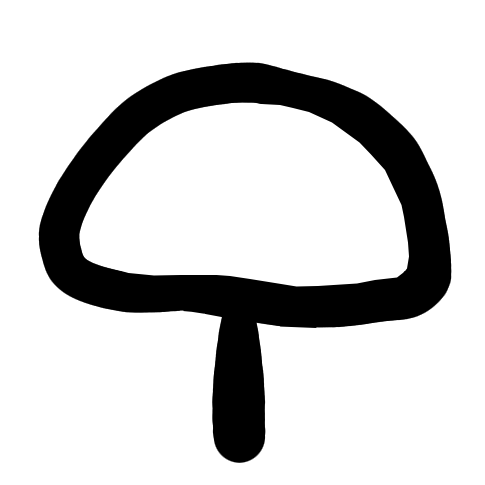
soko

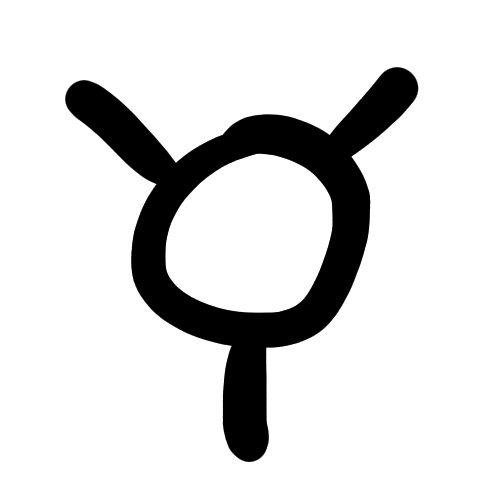
tonsi

== Encoding ==
Sitelen Pona
- Range: U+F1900..U+F19FF (256 code points)
- Plane: SPUA-A
- Scripts: Sitelen Pona
- Assigned: 155 code points
- Unused: 101 reserved code points
- Source standards: UCSUR
- Note: Part of the Private Use Area, font conflicts possible

As of October 2026, Sitelen Pona has not been encoded into Unicode. It is included in the unofficial Under-ConScript Unicode Registry since 2022, at the Private Use Area codepoints range U+F1900–U+F19FF.

Sitelen Pona^{[1]}^{[2]} Under-ConScript Unicode Registry
	0	1	2	3	4	5	6	7	8	9	A	B	C	D	E	F
U+F190x	󱤀	󱤁	󱤂	󱤃	󱤄	󱤅	󱤆	󱤇	󱤈	󱤉	󱤊	󱤋	󱤌	󱤍	󱤎	󱤏
U+F191x	󱤐	󱤑	󱤒	󱤓	󱤔	󱤕	󱤖	󱤗	󱤘	󱤙	󱤚	󱤛	󱤜	󱤝	󱤞	󱤟
U+F192x	󱤠	󱤡	󱤢	󱤣	󱤤	󱤥	󱤦	󱤧	󱤨	󱤩	󱤪	󱤫	󱤬	󱤭	󱤮	󱤯
U+F193x	󱤰	󱤱	󱤲	󱤳	󱤴	󱤵	󱤶	󱤷	󱤸	󱤹	󱤺	󱤻	󱤼	󱤽	󱤾	󱤿
U+F194x	󱥀	󱥁	󱥂	󱥃	󱥄	󱥅	󱥆	󱥇	󱥈	󱥉	󱥊	󱥋	󱥌	󱥍	󱥎	󱥏
U+F195x	󱥐	󱥑	󱥒	󱥓	󱥔	󱥕	󱥖	󱥗	󱥘	󱥙	󱥚	󱥛	󱥜	󱥝	󱥞	󱥟
U+F196x	󱥠	󱥡	󱥢	󱥣	󱥤	󱥥	󱥦	󱥧	󱥨	󱥩	󱥪	󱥫	󱥬	󱥭	󱥮	󱥯
U+F197x	󱥰	󱥱	󱥲	󱥳	󱥴	󱥵	󱥶	󱥷	󱥸	󱥹	󱥺	󱥻	󱥼	󱥽	󱥾	󱥿
U+F198x	󱦀	󱦁	󱦂	󱦃	󱦄	󱦅	󱦆	󱦇	󱦈	󱦉	󱦊	󱦋	󱦌			
U+F199x	󱦐	󱦑	󱦒	󱦓	󱦔	SP; STJ	SP; SCJ	SP; SLG	SP; ELG	SP; SGE	SP; SRLG	SP; ERLG	󱦜	󱦝	SP; CTM	
U+F19Ax	󱦠	󱦡	󱦢	󱦣	󱦤	󱦥	󱦦	󱦧	󱦨	󱦩	󱦪	󱦫	󱦬	󱦭	󱦮	󱦯
U+F19Bx	󱦰	󱦱	󱦲	󱦳	󱦴	󱦵	󱦶	󱦷	󱦸	󱦹	󱦺					
U+F19Cx																
U+F19Dx																
U+F19Ex																
U+F19Fx																
Notes: 1. Proposals 2022-01-31; revision 2022-05-20 and 2026-01-21; 2.Grey areas indicate non-assigned code points

== Publications ==
- Lang, Sonja (2014). Toki Pona: The Language of Good. Tawhid. ISBN 978-0978292300. OCLC 921253340.
- Lang, Sonja; Strake, Julius (2021). Toki Pona: Die Sprache des Guten (in German). ISBN 979-8770755251.
- Lang, Sonja (2024). The Wonderful Wizard of Oz (Toki Pona ed.). Amazon Digital Services LLC - Kdp. ISBN 978-0-9782923-7-9.
