= Quikscript =

Alternative English-language alphabet

- Script type: Alphabet
- Creator: Ronald Kingsley Read
- Period: c. 1966–present
- Direction: Left-to-right
- Language: English

Related scripts
- Parent systems: Shavian alphabet: Quikscript

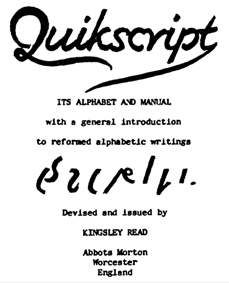
The front page of the Quikscript manual. The Quikscript text reads, "This is the way to do it."

Quikscript (also known as the Read Alphabet and Second Shaw) is a constructed alphabet intended to replace traditional English orthography. It is a revised version of the Shavian alphabet, designed to be written more quickly by hand than its predecessor and to be more universal.

== Origins and history ==
Read organized a lengthy public testing phase of Shavian by some 500 users from around the world who spoke different dialects of English. Once he had analyzed the results of those tests, Read decided to revise Shavian to incorporate a number of improvements to make it both easier and faster to write. He called the revised alphabet "Quikscript". In 1966, he published the Quikscript manual which set out the alphabet's rationale, and briefly discussed different possible methods of alphabet reform. The manual provides comprehensive instructions regarding the use of the alphabet along with reading samples.

== Description ==
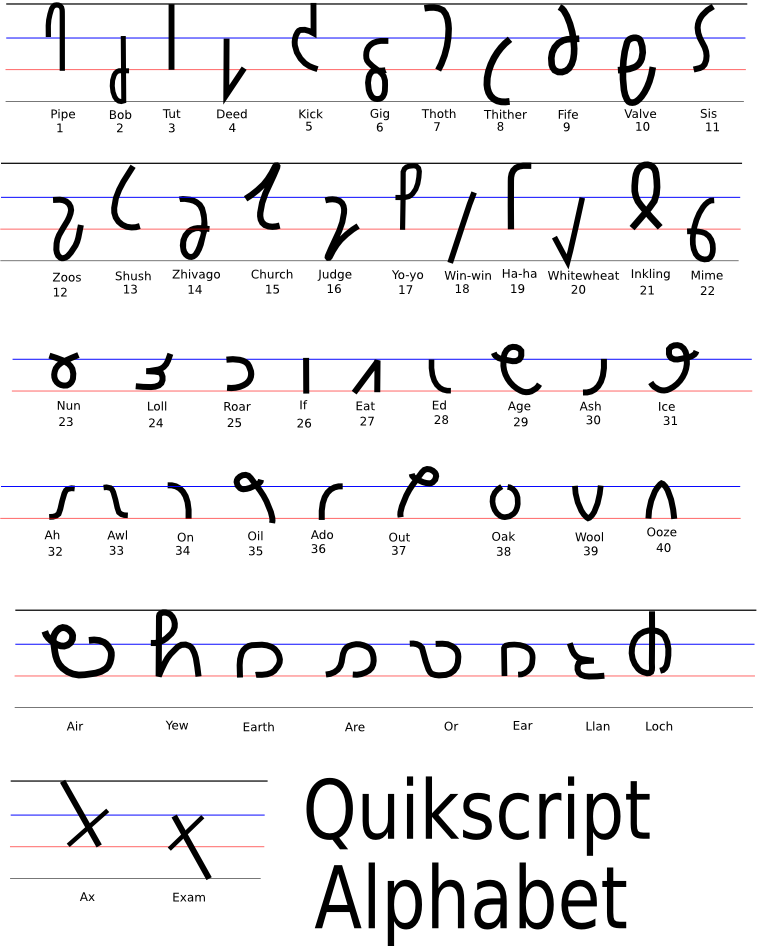
Alphabet chart with names for all letters and ligatures

Each Quikscript letter represents a single English phoneme. There are 25 consonants and 15 vowels, making 40 letters in all. The letters are designed to be written easily, each requiring only one (usually curved) pen stroke.

Just as in the Roman alphabet, there are short letters (e.g. a, c, e, m, and n), written between the base writing line and the "upper parallel" (as Read calls it), tall letters (e.g. b, d, f, k, and t), which ascend above the top of the short letters, and deep letters (e.g. g, j, p and y), which descend below the base writing line. Quikscript, however, makes better use of these possibilities with 11 tall, 11 deep, and 18 short letters. All vowels have short letter shapes, and the most common phonemes have the simplest letter shapes.

Similar-sounding phonemes have similar letter shapes, for example:

- Long vowels and glides are written with a larger bend or loop, while short vowels have a simpler shape.
- Every voiced consonant is written with a deep letter similar in shape to the corresponding voiceless consonant which is written with a tall letter.

While the Roman alphabet has two distinct forms for each letter, designated minuscule and majuscule, most letters in Quikscript have only one form. Names and proper nouns are preceded with a mid-line "name-dot" (·) which is sufficient to distinguish them from ordinary words.

=== Junior Quikscript ===
Beginners learn Junior Quikscript first, which is much more similar to the Shavian alphabet. Each word is spelled "as it is spoken". Each letter is written separately from the next so that it is equivalent to what is termed "printing" in the Roman alphabet. Some people may prefer Junior Quikscript for printed texts as readers are used to the Roman alphabet being printed in that manner.

==== Examples ====
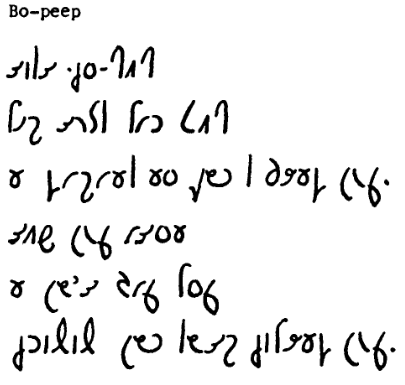
Junior Quikscript example passage from 'Little Bo Peep'

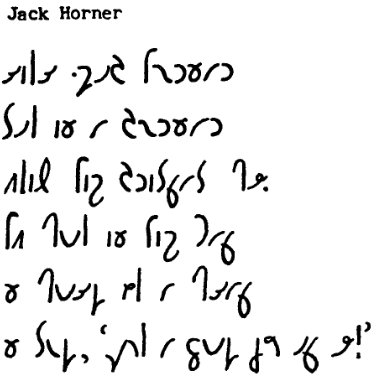
Junior Quikscript example passage from 'Little Jack Horner'

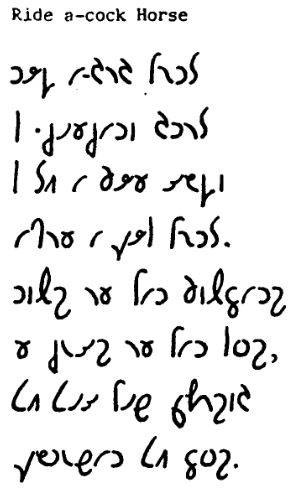
Junior Quikscript example passage from 'Ride a cock horse to Banbury Cross'

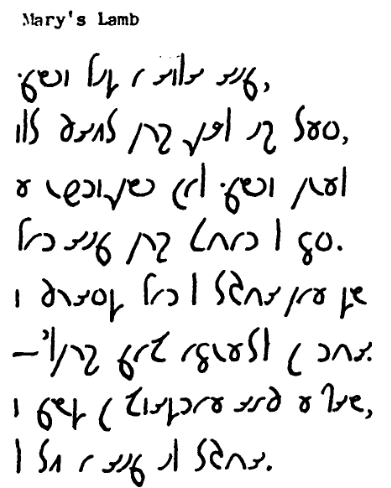
Junior Quikscript example passage from 'Mary Had a Little Lamb'

=== Senior Quikscript ===
Senior Quikscript introduces a number of advanced techniques which save time in writing, namely ligatures, cursive, alternate letter forms, abbreviations and half-letters.

==== Ligatures and cursive ====
The most obvious difference is that Senior encourages ligatures as long as the shapes of the letters are not altered. The design of the alphabet fosters these natural connections, as each Quikscript letter either begins or ends on the base line or the upper parallel. This structure permits letters to connect easily yet maintains the shapes of the individual letters because there are no connecting strokes between letters as there are in cursive Roman alphabet writing. It is common that Senior writing will have several conjoined letters in a row, but when such a connection is not possible, the letters are simply left unconnected.

==== Alternate letter forms and abbreviations ====
Read added a very small number of alternative letter forms, which permit even more letters to connect easily, along with a number of abbreviations for the most common English words, further reducing the space requirement for printed material and hence the costs of physical publication; it is the writer's choice whether to use them or not.

==== Half-letters ====
Senior Quikscript also introduces the concept of half-letters. Read recognized that the top half of several tall letters and the bottom half of several deep letters are sufficient to clearly distinguish them. Therefore, the portion of the vertical shafts of those letters which lies between the base line and upper parallel can be discarded with no effect to legibility. Half-letters increase the number of letters which can be conjoined, yielding several benefits:

1. The alphabet's appearance becomes more cursive and fluid, which is aesthetically appealing.
2. Handwriting is more efficient because fewer pen-lifts are required.
3. Word-shapes are more variable and distinct, which improves word recognition and increases the average reading speed.

==== Examples ====
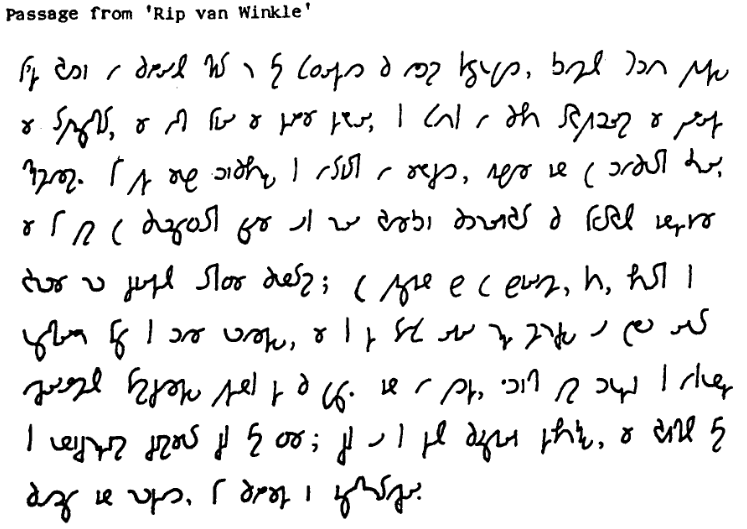
Senior Quikscript example passage from 'Rip van Winkle'

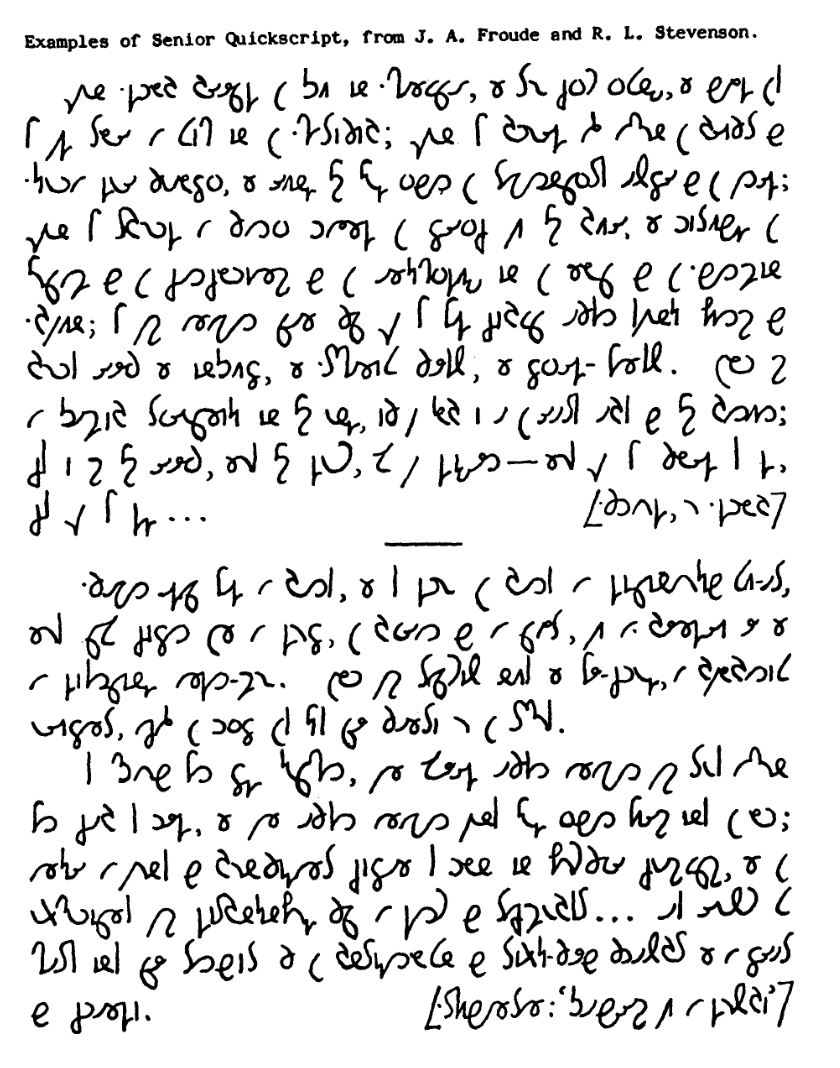
Senior Quikscript example passage from 'J. A. Froude and R. L. Stevenson'

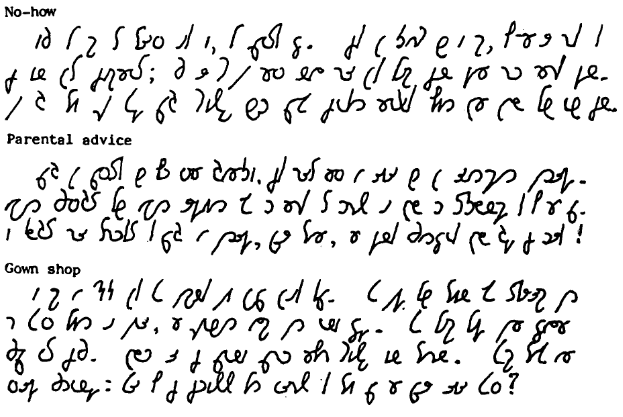
Senior Quikscript example passages

== Images ==
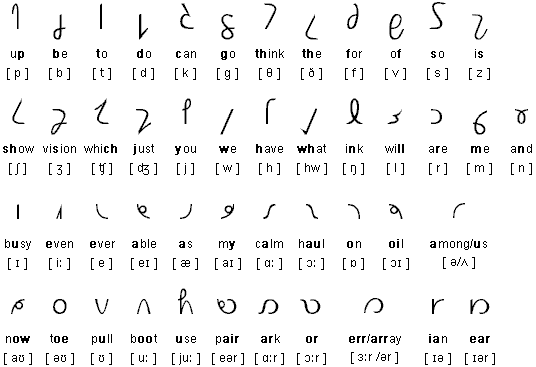
Quikscript alphabet with phonetic value of each letter

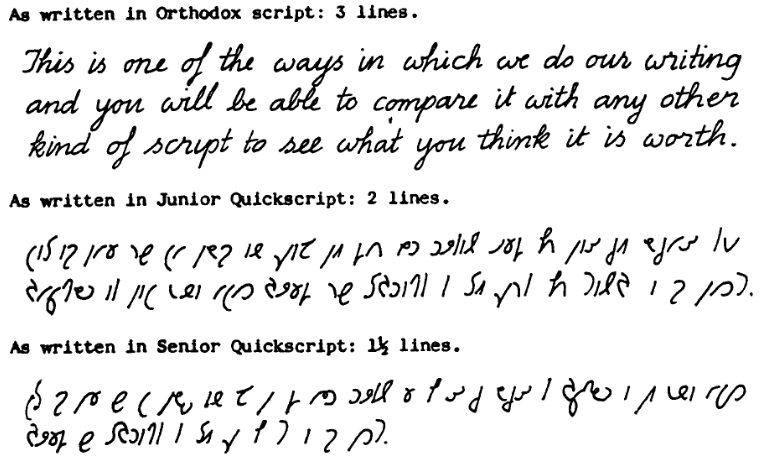
Quikscript example in latin alphabet, Junior Quikscript and Senior Quikscript

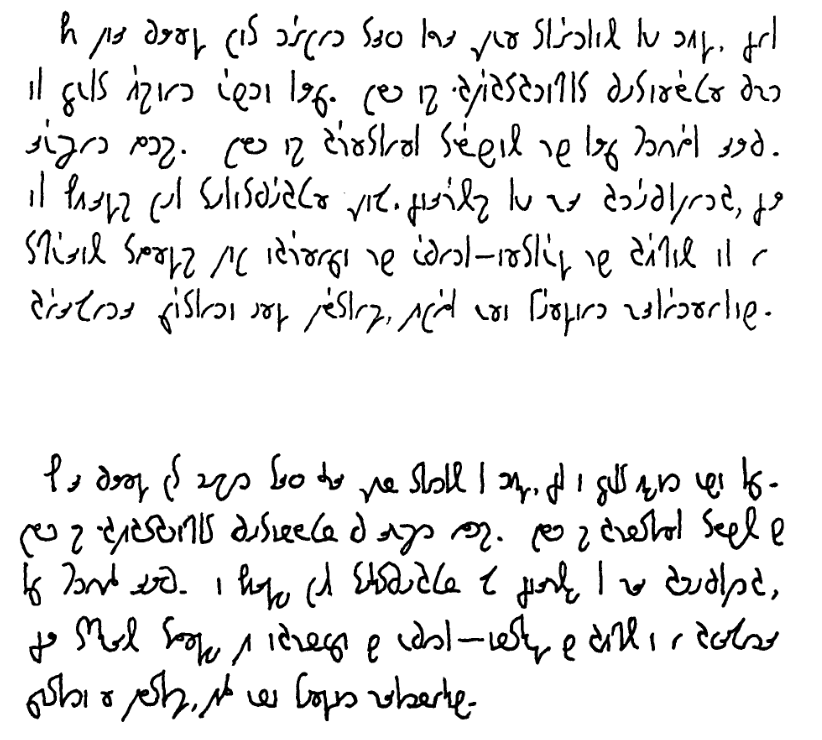
Quikscript example of the same passage in Junior Quikscript (above) and Senior Quikscript (below)

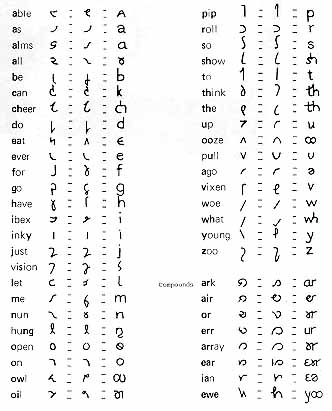
The Shaw Alphabet, Quikscript, and Readspel, printed by Read's daughter Mavis Mottram

== References in literature ==
Book two of the popular Cole's Funny Picture Books, published in Australia by E. W. Cole at the turn of the 20th century, was revised in 1979 to include an article introducing Quikscript under the name Second Shaw.

== See also ==
- Featural writing system
- Pronunciation respelling
- Language planning § Graphization
