= Shavian (Unicode block) =

- Range: U+10450..U+1047F (48 code points)
- Plane: SMP
- Scripts: Shavian
- Major alphabets: Shavian English
- Assigned: 48 code points
- Unused: 0 reserved code points
- Source standards: ConScript Unicode Registry

Unicode version history
- 4.0 (2003): 48 (+48)

Unicode documentation
- Code chart ∣ Web page

Shavian is a Unicode block containing characters of the Shavian alphabet (also known as the Shaw alphabet), an orthography invented to write English phonemically and funded by the will of George Bernard Shaw. The Shavian block was derived from an earlier private use encoding in the ConScript Unicode Registry, like the Deseret and Phaistos Disc encodings.

Shavian^{[1]} Official Unicode Consortium code chart (PDF)
| | 0 | 1 | 2 | 3 | 4 | 5 | 6 | 7 | 8 | 9 | A | B | C | D | E | F |
| U+1045x | 𐑐 | 𐑑 | 𐑒 | 𐑓 | 𐑔 | 𐑕 | 𐑖 | 𐑗 | 𐑘 | 𐑙 | 𐑚 | 𐑛 | 𐑜 | 𐑝 | 𐑞 | 𐑟 |
| U+1046x | 𐑠 | 𐑡 | 𐑢 | 𐑣 | 𐑤 | 𐑥 | 𐑦 | 𐑧 | 𐑨 | 𐑩 | 𐑪 | 𐑫 | 𐑬 | 𐑭 | 𐑮 | 𐑯 |
| U+1047x | 𐑰 | 𐑱 | 𐑲 | 𐑳 | 𐑴 | 𐑵 | 𐑶 | 𐑷 | 𐑸 | 𐑹 | 𐑺 | 𐑻 | 𐑼 | 𐑽 | 𐑾 | 𐑿 |
Notes 1.As of Unicode version 17.0

== History ==
The following Unicode-related documents record the purpose and process of defining specific characters in the Shavian block:

| Version | Final code points (Note: Proposed code points and characters names may differ from final code points and names) | Count | L2 ID | WG2 ID | Document |
|---|---|---|---|---|---|
| 4.0 | U+10450..1047F | 48 | L2/97-103 | | Jenkins, John H. (1997-05-21), Proposal to add Shavian to ISO/IEC 10646 |
| 4.0 | U+10450..1047F | 48 | | N1576 | Proposal to add Shavian, 1997-05-21 |
| 4.0 | U+10450..1047F | 48 | L2/97-288 | N1603 | Umamaheswaran, V. S. (1997-10-24), "8.24.2", Unconfirmed Meeting Minutes, WG 2 Meeting # 33, Heraklion, Crete, Greece, 20 June – 4 July 1997 |
| 4.0 | U+10450..1047F | 48 | L2/01-256 | N2362 | Everson, Michael; Jenkins, John (2001-06-03), Proposal for encoding the Shavian script in the SMP of the UCS |
| 4.0 | U+10450..1047F | 48 | L2/01-285 | N2362R | Everson, Michael; Jenkins, John (2001-07-14), Revised proposal for encoding the Shavian script in the SMP of the UCS |
| 4.0 | U+10450..1047F | 48 | L2/01-295R | | Moore, Lisa (2001-11-06), "Motion 88-M7", Minutes from the UTC/L2 meeting #88, "The UTC approves encoding the Shavian script at 10450..1047F." |
