= John W. Cowan =

American programmer

John Woldemar Cowan is an American programmer known for work with XML and Unicode. Cowan is an alumnus member of the Unicode Consortium and was an editor of the XML 1.1 specification. He is also the founder of the ConScript Unicode Registry, which is maintained by him and Michael Everson.

Until he resigned on Aug 15, 2023, he was the chair of the working group defining the R7RS Large standard of the Scheme programming language.

Cowan has revised William Strunk's The Elements of Style (now in the public domain). His revisions are "founded on the principle that rules of usage and style cannot be drawn out of thin air, nor constructed a priori according to logic; they must depend on the actual practice of those who are generally acknowledged to be good writers".

Cowan is also the author of a comprehensive reference grammar of the constructed language Lojban.
