= Ronald Kingsley Read =

Creator of Shavian alphabet and Quikscript

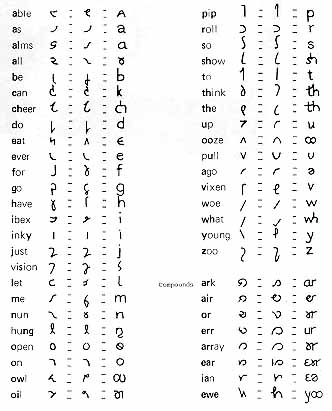
Read's three inventions: the Shaw alphabet, Quikscript, and Readspel, printed by Read's daughter Mavis Mottram

Ronald Kingsley Read (19 February 1887 – February 1975) was one of four contestants chosen in 1959 to share the prize money for the design of the Shavian alphabet, a completely new alphabet intended for the writing of English. In 1960, he was appointed sole responsible designer of the alphabet.

In the early 1960s, Read produced the quarterly journal Shaw-script, which was printed using the Shavian alphabet.

In 1966, after extensive testing of Shavian with English speakers from around the world, Read introduced Quikscript, a revised form of his Shavian alphabet. Quikscript, also known as the "Read alphabet", has more ligatures than Shavian, which makes it easier to write by hand. Its appearance is more cursive than Shavian.

A few days before his death, he completed a new alphabet called Soundspell (now Readspel; not to be confused with Soundspel), based, probably for increased chances of popular acceptance, on the Latin script.
