= Shavian alphabet =

Phonemic, featural alphabet for English

Shavian alphabet 𐑖𐑱𐑝𐑾𐑯 𐑨𐑤𐑓𐑩𐑚𐑧𐑑
- Script type: Alphabet
- Creator: Ronald Kingsley Read
- Period: 1960–present
- Direction: Left-to-right
- Languages: English, Esperanto

Related scripts
- Parent systems: (Constructed writing system): Shavian alphabet
- Child systems: Quikscript, Ŝava

ISO 15924
- ISO 15924: Shaw (281), Shavian (Shaw)

Unicode
- Unicode alias: Shavian
- Unicode range: U+10450–U+1047F

The Shaw Alphabet Edition of Androcles and the Lion, 1962. Paperback cover design by Germano Facetti

The Shavian alphabet (/ˈʃeɪviən/ SHAY-vee-ən; also known as the Shaw alphabet) is a constructed alphabet conceived as a way to provide simple, phonemic orthography for the English language to replace the inefficiencies and difficulties of conventional spelling using the Latin alphabet. It was posthumously funded by and named after the playwright George Bernard Shaw and designed by Ronald Kingsley Read, a professional signwriter and letterer.

Shaw set three main criteria for the new alphabet:

1. at least 40 letters (it ended up with 48, including ligatures);
2. as phonetic as possible (that is, letters should have a 1:1 correspondence to phonemes);
3. distinct from the Latin alphabet (to avoid the impression that the new spellings were simply misspellings).

== Letters ==
The Shavian alphabet consists of three types of letters: tall (with an ascender), deep (with a descender) and short. All vowels but the consonant–vowel ligature yew are short. Among consonants, the short letters are liquids (r, l) and nasals (m, n); these, the semivowels (y, w) and the heng letters (h, ng) are derived from each other through rotation or reflection. Tall letters are voiceless consonants, excepting Yea 𐑘 and Hung 𐑙. A tall letter rotated 180°, with the tall part now extending below the baseline, becomes a deep letter, representing the corresponding voiced consonants (except Haha 𐑣). These rotation pairs, with the exception of the heng consonants, are the same letters that are paired in Pitman shorthand. Affricates, several diphthongs, and rhotic vowels are ligatures. The alphabet is therefore to some extent featural.

Tall and deep letters:
Shavian letter
Unicode text	𐑐 𐑚	𐑑 𐑛	𐑒 𐑜	𐑓 𐑝	𐑔 𐑞
Pronunciation (may vary, see below)	/p/ /b/	/t/ /d/	/k/ /ɡ/	/f/ /v/	/θ/ /ð/
Name/example	peep bib	tot dead	kick gag	fee vow	thigh they
𐑕 𐑟	𐑖 𐑠	𐑗 𐑡	𐑘 𐑢	𐑙 𐑣
/s/ /z/	/ʃ/ /ʒ/	/tʃ/ /dʒ/	/j/ /w/	/ŋ/ /h/
so zoo	sure measure	church judge	yea woe	hung ha-ha
Short letters:
𐑤 𐑮	𐑥 𐑯	𐑦 𐑰	𐑧 𐑱	𐑨 𐑲
/l/ /r/	/m/ /n/	/ɪ/ /iː/	/ɛ/ /eɪ/	/æ/ /aɪ/
loll roar	mime nun	if eat	egg age	ash ice
𐑩 𐑳	𐑪 𐑴	𐑫 𐑵	𐑬 𐑶	𐑭 𐑷
/ə/ /ʌ/	/ɒ/ /oʊ/	/ʊ/ /uː/	/aʊ/ /ɔɪ/	/ɑː/ /ɔː/
ado up	on oak	wool ooze	out oil	ah awe
Ligatures:
𐑸 𐑹	𐑺 𐑻	𐑼 𐑽	𐑾 𐑿
/ɑːr/ /ɔːr/	/ɛər/ /ɜːr/	/ər/ /ɪər/	/iə/ /juː/
are or	air err	array ear	Ian yew

There are no separate uppercase or lowercase letters as in the Latin script; instead of using capitalization to mark proper nouns, a "namer-dot" (·) is placed before a name. Sentences are typically not started with a namer-dot, unless it is otherwise called for. All other punctuation and word spacing is similar to conventional orthography.

Each character in the Shavian alphabet requires only a single stroke to be written on paper. The writing utensil needs to be lifted up only once when writing each character, thus enabling faster overall writing than Latin script.

Spelling in Androcles follows the phonemic distinctions of Received Pronunciation except for explicitly indicating vocalic "r" with the above ligatures. Most dialectal variations of English pronunciation can be regularly produced from this spelling, but those who do not make certain distinctions, particularly in the vowels, find it difficult to produce the canonical spellings spontaneously. For instance, most North American dialects merge 𐑭 /ɑː/ and 𐑪 /ɒ/ (the father–bother merger), though standard English orthography is a guide.

There is no ability to indicate word stress, so billow /ˈbɪloʊ/ and below /bɪˈloʊ/ are both spelled 𐑚𐑦𐑤𐑴, and diploid /ˈdɪplɔɪd/ and deployed /dɪˈplɔɪd/ are both spelled 𐑛𐑦𐑐𐑤𐑶𐑛. However, in most cases the reduction of unstressed vowels is sufficient to distinguish word pairs that are distinguished only by stress in spoken discourse. For instance, the noun convict /ˈkɒnvɪkt/ and the verb convict /kənˈvɪkt/ can be spelled 𐑒𐑪𐑯𐑝𐑦𐑒𐑑 kɒnvɪkt and 𐑒𐑩𐑯𐑝𐑦𐑒𐑑 kənvɪkt, respectively.

Additionally, five common words are abbreviated as single letters. The words the (𐑞), of (𐑝), and (𐑯), to (𐑑), and for (𐑓) are written with the single letters indicated.

== History ==
Libraries were furnished with free hardcover copies of Androcles and the Lion: Shaw Alphabet Edition, 1962. Cover design by Germano Facetti

George Bernard Shaw, the writer, critic and playwright, was a vocal critic of English spelling because it often deviates from the alphabetic principle. Shaw had served from 1926 to 1939 on the BBC's Advisory Committee on Spoken English, which included several exponents of phonetic writing. He also knew Henry Sweet, creator of Current Shorthand (and a prototype for the character of Henry Higgins), although Shaw himself for years wrote his literary works in Pitman shorthand. However, he found its limitations frustrating as well and realized that it was not a suitable replacement for traditional orthography, making the production of printed material difficult and impossible to type. Shaw desired and advocated a phonetic spelling reform, and this called for a new alphabet.

All of his interest in spelling and alphabet reform was made clear in Shaw's will of June 1950, in which provision was made for (Isaac) James Pitman, with a grant in aid from the Public Trustee, to establish a Shaw Alphabet. Following Shaw's death in November 1950, and after some legal dispute, the Trustee announced a worldwide competition to design such an alphabet, with the aim of producing a system that would be an economical way of writing and of printing the English language. A contest for the design of the new alphabet was won by four people, including Ronald Kingsley Read who had corresponded extensively with Shaw for several years regarding such an alphabet. Read was then appointed to amalgamate the four designs to produce the new alphabet.

Due to the contestation of Shaw's will, the trust charged with developing the new alphabet could afford to publish only one book: a version of Shaw's play Androcles and the Lion, in a bi-alphabetic edition with both conventional and Shavian spellings (1962 Penguin Books, London). Copies were sent to major libraries in English-speaking countries.

In 1963, Imperial Typewriter Company produced the world's first portable typewriter "carrying the full Shavian alphabet, figures and punctuation marks plus one normal alphabet with which to address envelopes, etc."

== Other print literature ==
Between 1963 and 1965, 8 issues of the journal, Shaw-script, were published by Read in Worcester, U.K. The journal used Shaw's Alphabet, and much of the content was submitted by Shaw enthusiasts. In more recent years, there have been several published works of classical literature transliterated into Shavian.

The first, released in 2012, was the works of Edgar Allan Poe entitled Poe Meets Shaw: The Shaw Alphabet Edition of Edgar Allan Poe, by Tim Browne. This book was published via Shaw Alphabet Books and had two editions in its original release. One, like Androcles and the Lion, had Shavian side-by-side with the Latin equivalent and the other was a Shavian-only edition.

The second, released in 2013, was an edition of Alice's Adventures in Wonderland, transcribed into Shavian by Thomas Thurman. This was published as a Shaw-only edition with no side-by-side Latin equivalent. The Shavian fonts were designed by Michael Everson.

In 2019, a print version of Pride and Prejudice was published in Shaw-only form by the website Shavian.info.

== Variants ==
=== Quikscript ===
Some years after the initial publication of the Shaw alphabet, Read expanded it to create Quikscript, also known as the Read Alphabet or the Second Shaw Alphabet. Quikscript is intended to be more useful for handwriting, and to that end is more cursive and uses more ligatures. It is also intended to be closer to shorthand, with a "senior Quikscript" mode providing many more shortenings. Some letter forms are roughly the same in both alphabets, though the rotation symmetry of tall–deep pairs is sacrificed for connected handwriting. See the separate article for more details.

=== Shavian in Esperanto (Ŝava alfabeto) ===
The Shavian alphabet adapted to write Esperanto: alphabet and ligatures

An adaptation of Shavian to another language, Esperanto, was developed by John Wesley Starling; though not widely used, at least one booklet has been published with transliterated sample texts. As that language is already spelled phonemically, direct conversion between Latin and Shavian letters can be performed, though several ligatures are added for the common combinations of vowels with n and s and some common short words. Vowels use the letters of the orthographically equivalent short vowels in English (i.e. ă ĕ ĭ ŏ ŭ), except that o and u are reversed, as are j and w. The oo-vowel letters are reassigned to m and n, and the unneeded letters for th and ng are assigned to c and ĥ.

Pronunciations that differ from their English values are marked bold.

Ŝava letter	𐑨	𐑚	𐑔	𐑗	𐑛	𐑧	𐑓	𐑜	𐑡	𐑣	𐑙	𐑦	𐑢	𐑠
Pronunciation	[a]	[b]	[ts]	[tʃ]	[d]	[e]	[f]	[ɡ]	[dʒ]	[h]	[x]	[i]	[j]	[ʒ]
Conventional orthography	a	b	c	ĉ	d	e	f	g	ĝ	h	ĥ	i	j	ĵ
Conventional orthography	𐑒	𐑤	𐑫	𐑵	𐑩	𐑐	𐑮	𐑕	𐑖	𐑑	𐑪	𐑘	𐑝	𐑟
Conventional orthography	[k]	[l]	[m]	[n]	[o]	[p]	[r]	[s]	[ʃ]	[t]	[u]	[w]	[v]	[z]
Conventional orthography	k	l	m	n	o	p	r	s	ŝ	t	u	ŭ	v	z
Conventional orthography	Short words
Conventional orthography	la	kaj	aŭ

== Unicode ==
Shavian was added to the Unicode Standard in April 2003 with the release of version 4.0. Esperanto ligatures are not supported.

=== Block ===
The Unicode block for Shavian is U+10450–U+1047F and is in Plane 1 (the Supplementary Multilingual Plane).

Shavian^{[1]} Official Unicode Consortium code chart (PDF)
	0	1	2	3	4	5	6	7	8	9	A	B	C	D	E	F
U+1045x	𐑐	𐑑	𐑒	𐑓	𐑔	𐑕	𐑖	𐑗	𐑘	𐑙	𐑚	𐑛	𐑜	𐑝	𐑞	𐑟
U+1046x	𐑠	𐑡	𐑢	𐑣	𐑤	𐑥	𐑦	𐑧	𐑨	𐑩	𐑪	𐑫	𐑬	𐑭	𐑮	𐑯
U+1047x	𐑰	𐑱	𐑲	𐑳	𐑴	𐑵	𐑶	𐑷	𐑸	𐑹	𐑺	𐑻	𐑼	𐑽	𐑾	𐑿
Notes 1.As of Unicode version 18.0

=== Fonts ===
While the Shavian alphabet was added to Unicode 4.0 in 2003, Unicode Shavian fonts are still quite rare. A brief list of fonts with known Shavian coverage can be found on https://shavian.info. Before it was standardized, fonts were made that include Shavian letters in the places of Roman letters, and/or in an agreed-upon location in the Unicode private use area, allocated from the ConScript Unicode Registry and now superseded by the official Unicode standard.

== See also ==
- Quikscript
- Esperanto
- Pitman shorthand
- Gregg shorthand
- Deseret alphabet
- Unifon alphabet
- English-language spelling reform
