= Toki Pona =

Minimalist language by Sonja Lang

- toki pona
- Logo of Toki Pona, presenting the words toki pona written in Sitelen Pona
- Pronunciation: [ˈtoki ˈpona]
- Created by: Sonja Lang
- Date: 2001
- Setting and usage: Testing principles of minimalism, the Sapir–Whorf hypothesis and pidgins
- Users: 500–5000 (2021)
- Purpose: Constructed language, combining elements of the subgenres personal language and philosophical language
- Writing system: Latin script (sitelen Lasina); Sitelen Pona; Sitelen Sitelen; Numerous other community-made scripts
- Signed forms: luka pona (sign language); toki pona luka (manually-coded)
- Sources: A posteriori language, with elements of English, Tok Pisin, Finnish, Georgian, Dutch, Acadian French, Esperanto, Serbo-Croatian and Chinese

Language codes
- ISO 639-3: tok
- Glottolog: toki1239
- IETF: tok

Toki Pona (/ˈtoʊ.ki ˈpoʊ.nə/; toki pona, (Note: When writing in Toki Pona, capital letters are used only for proper names, such as the names of people.) pronounced [ˈto.ki ˈpo.na], lit. 'the language of good') is a philosophical and artistic constructed language designed for its small vocabulary, simplicity, and ease of acquisition. It was created by Canadian translator and polyglot Sonja Lang with the stated purpose of simplifying her thoughts and communication. The first drafts were published online in 2001, while the complete form was published in the 2014 book Toki Pona: The Language of Good (referred to as lipu pu in Toki Pona). Lang also released the Toki Pona Dictionary (lipu ku) in July 2021, describing the language as used by its community of speakers. In 2024, a third book was released, a Toki Pona adaptation of The Wonderful Wizard of Oz, written in Sitelen Pona.

Toki Pona is an isolating language with only 14 phonemes and an underlying feature of minimalism. It focuses on simple, near-universal concepts to maximize expression from very few words. In Toki Pona: The Language of Good, Lang presents around 120 words, while the later Toki Pona Dictionary lists 137 "essential" words and a small number of less-used ones. (Note: Prior to the publication of Toki Pona: The Language of Good, the language grew to 118 root words. Between then and the publication of Toki Pona Dictionary, varying counts were given for the number of words in the former (nimi pu, lit. 'words of the official Toki Pona book'), ranging between 120 and 125. The Toki Pona Dictionary added 16 new "essential" words (nimi ku suli, lit. 'important dictionary words'), and states on its back cover that there are a total of 137. It also includes several less-used words (nimi ku pi suli ala or nimi ku lili, lit. 'dictionary words of little importance').) Its words are easy to pronounce across language backgrounds, which allows it to serve as a bridge for people of different cultures. However, it was not created as an international auxiliary language. Partly inspired by Taoist philosophy, the language is designed to help users concentrate on basic things and to promote positive thinking, in accordance with the Sapir–Whorf hypothesis. Despite the small vocabulary, speakers can understand and communicate, mainly relying on context, combinations of words, and expository sentences to express more specific meanings.

After its initial creation, a small community of speakers developed in the early 2000s. While activity mainly takes place online in chat rooms, on social media, and in other online groups, there have been a few organized in-person meetups.

== Etymology ==
The name of the language has two parts: toki 'language', derived from Tok Pisin tok, which itself comes from English talk; and pona 'good, simple', from Esperanto bona, from Latin bonus. (Note: "Toki Pona word origins". tokipona.org. 28 September 2009.) The name toki pona therefore means 'good language', 'the language of good' and 'simple language', emphasizing that the language encourages speakers to find joy in simplicity.

== Purpose ==
Toki Pona was designed both as a personal artistic language and a philosophical language focused on minimalism. It is designed to express maximal meaning with minimal complexity. Inspired by pidgins, it focuses on simple concepts and elements that are common among cultures. Its minimal vocabulary and 14 phonemes are devised to be easy to pronounce for speakers of various language backgrounds.

Partly inspired by Taoist philosophy, another goal of Toki Pona is to help its speakers focus on the essentials by reducing complex concepts to basic elements. From these simple notions, more complex ideas can be built up by simple combining. Some argue that this allows the users to see the fundamental nature and effect of the ideas expressed. It was designed for the speakers to become aware of the present moment and pay more attention to the surroundings and the words people use. According to its author, Toki Pona is meant to be "fun and cute".

On the basis of the Sapir–Whorf hypothesis, which states that a language influences the way its speakers think and behave, Toki Pona was designed to induce positive thinking.

Although it was not intended as an international auxiliary language, a worldwide online community uses it for communication.

== History ==
Toki Pona was developed by the Canadian polyglot and translator Sonja Lang. Born in 1978 in Moncton, New Brunswick, Lang grew up in a bilingual family; her mother spoke French, and her father spoke English. During and after her high school years, she became fluent in five languages, including Esperanto. Esperanto was the inspiration for her creation of constructed languages.

In 2001, Lang was experiencing depression and started working on Toki Pona as a way to simplify her thoughts. In the same year, an early version of the language was published online, and it quickly gained popularity. An early community formed in a Yahoo group created by Lang. She was inspired by hunter-gatherers, saying in an interview with The Atlantic: "I thought, what would it have been like to just be a person in nature, interacting with things in a primitive way?"

Click to access a PDF of Toki Pona: The Language of Good

In 2014, Lang released her first book on the language, Toki Pona: The Language of Good, which features 120 main words, plus 3 words presented as synonyms of these, (Note: While some sources consider ale and ali separate words, they are just variations of the same word.) though generally in use with different meanings, and provides a completed form of the language based on how Lang used the language at the time. In 2016, the book was also published in French, and versions in German, Esperanto, and Persian have since been completed. In April 2026, Lang posted a declaration on X.com dedicating the original English edition of the book to the public domain.

In 2021, Lang released her second book, Toki Pona Dictionary, a comprehensive two-way Toki Pona–English dictionary including more than 11,000 entries detailing the use of the language as she gathered from polls conducted in the ma pona pi toki pona Discord server over a few months. The book presents the original 120 words plus 16 nimi ku suli (lit. 'major dictionary words') as gathered from at least over 40% of respondents. It also contains 45 words given by 40% or less of respondents, referred to as nimi ku pi suli ala (lit. 'minor dictionary words'), sometimes also called nimi ku lili.

After two failed applications for an ISO 639-3 code, a third request was filed in August 2021, which resulted in the ISO 639-3 code tok being adopted in January 2022.

Toki Pona was the subject of some scientific works, and it has also been used for artificial intelligence and software tools. One psychiatrist has studied a therapeutic method for eliminating negative thinking by having patients keep track of their thoughts in the language. In 2010, it was chosen for the first version of the vocabulary for the ROILA project. The purpose of the study was to investigate the use of an artificial language on the accuracy of machine speech recognition, and it was revealed that the modified vocabulary of Toki Pona significantly outperformed English.

In February of 2024, Lang released the book The Wonderful Wizard of Oz (Toki Pona edition), the first in a planned series of illustrated storybooks written in Sitelen Pona (referred to collectively as lipu su).

== Phonology ==
=== Phonemic inventory ===
Toki Pona has nine consonants (/p, t, k, s, m, n, l, j, w/) and five vowels (/a, e, i, o, u/). Stress falls on the initial syllable of a word, and it is marked by an increase in loudness, length, or pitch. There are no diphthongs, vowel hiatus, contrasting vowel length, consonant clusters (except those starting with the nasal coda), or tones. Both its sound inventory and phonotactics are compatible with the majority of human languages, and are therefore readily accessible.

Consonants
| | Labial | Coronal | Dorsal |
|---|---|---|---|
| Nasal | m | n | |
| Stop | p | t | k |
| Fricative | | s | |
| Approximant | w | l | j |

Vowels
| | Front | Back |
|---|---|---|
| Close | i | u |
| Mid | e | o |
| Open | a | |

=== Distribution ===
The statistical vowel spread is fairly typical when compared with other languages. Counting each word once, 32% of vowels are /a/, 25% are /i/, with /e/ and /o/ a bit over 15% each, and 10% are /u/. The usage frequency from the official Toki Pona mailing list and websites of fluent speakers was slightly more skewed: 34% /a/, 30% /i/, 15% each /e/ and /o/, and 6% /u/.

Of the syllable-initial consonants, /l/ is the most common, at 20% total; /k, s, p/ are over 10%, then the nasals /m, n/ (not counting final n), with the least common, at little more than 5% each, being /t, w, j/. The high frequency of /l/ and low frequency of /t/ is somewhat unusual among the world's languages.

=== Phonotactics ===
The first syllable of a word follows the form (C)V(N), i.e. an optional consonant, a vowel, and an optional final nasal. Subsequent syllables follow the same form, except that the leading consonant is required. Syllables can thus be CV, CVN, V, or VN. As in most languages, CV is the most common syllable type, at 75% (counting each word once).

The following sequences are not allowed: * /wu, wo, ji, ti/, nor may a syllable's final nasal occur immediately before /m/ or /n/ in the same word.

Proper nouns are usually converted into Toki Pona proper adjectives using a set of guidelines. The native, or even colloquial, pronunciation is used as the basis for the subsequent sound conversion. Thus, English becomes Inli and John becomes San.

Valid syllables in Toki Pona
| | -a | -an | -e | -en | -i | -in | -o | -on | -u | -un |
|---|---|---|---|---|---|---|---|---|---|---|
| ∅- | a | an | e | en | i | in | o | on | u | un |
| p- | pa | pan | pe | pen | pi | pin | po | pon | pu | pun |
| t- | ta | tan | te | ten | —N/a | | to | ton | tu | tun |
| k- | ka | kan | ke | ken | ki | kin | ko | kon | ku | kun |
| m- | ma | man | me | men | mi | min | mo | mon | mu | mun |
| n- | na | nan | ne | nen | ni | nin | no | non | nu | nun |
| s- | sa | san | se | sen | si | sin | so | son | su | sun |
| l- | la | lan | le | len | li | lin | lo | lon | lu | lun |
| w- | wa | wan | we | wen | wi | win | —N/a | | | |
| j- | ja | jan | je | jen | —N/a | | jo | jon | ju | jun |

=== Allophony ===
Because of its small phoneme inventory, Toki Pona allows for extensive allophonic variation. For example, /p t k/ may be pronounced [b d ɡ] as well as [p t k], along with /t/ being either dental, alveolar, or retroflex, /s/ as [z] or [ʃ] as well as [s], /l/ as [ɾ] as well as [l], and vowels may be either long or short.

Furthermore, while written as n, the nasal at the end of a syllable can be pronounced as any nasal stop, and it is normally assimilated to the following consonant.

== Writing systems ==
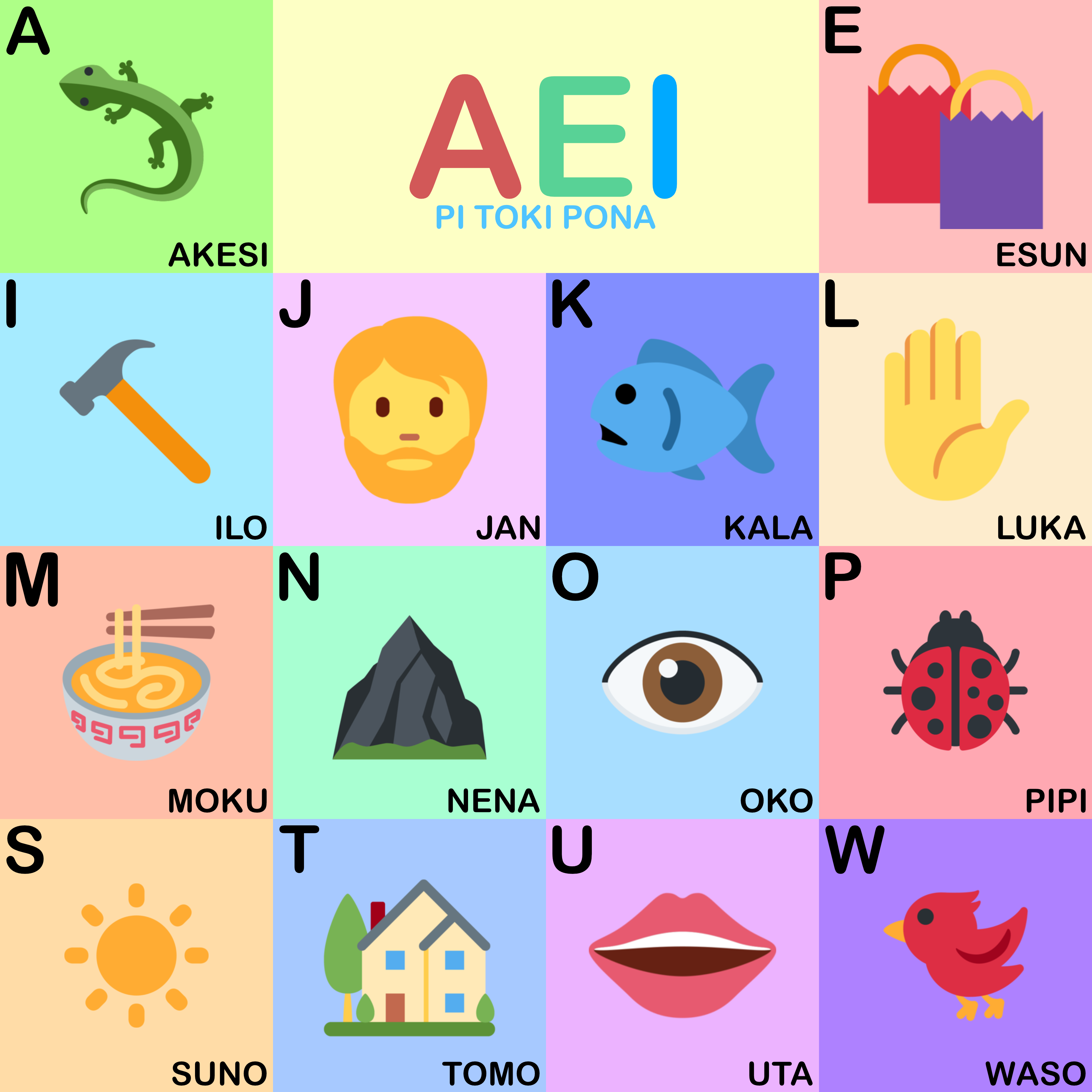
Latin alphabet chart for Toki Pona

Fourteen letters of the Latin alphabet (Note: Commonly referred to as sitelen Lasina in Toki Pona)—a, e, i, j, k, l, m, n, o, p, s, t, u, w—are used to write the language. They have the same values as in the International Phonetic Alphabet: j sounds like English y (as in many Germanic and Slavic languages) and the vowels are like those of Spanish, Modern Greek, or Modern Hebrew. Capital initials are used to mark proper names, while common words are always written with lowercase letters, even when they start a sentence.

Besides the Latin alphabet, which is the most common way of writing the language, many alternative writing systems have been developed for and adapted to Toki Pona. Most successful and widespread are two logographic writing systems, Sitelen Pona and Sitelen Sitelen. Both were included in the book Toki Pona: The Language of Good.

=== Sitelen Pona ===
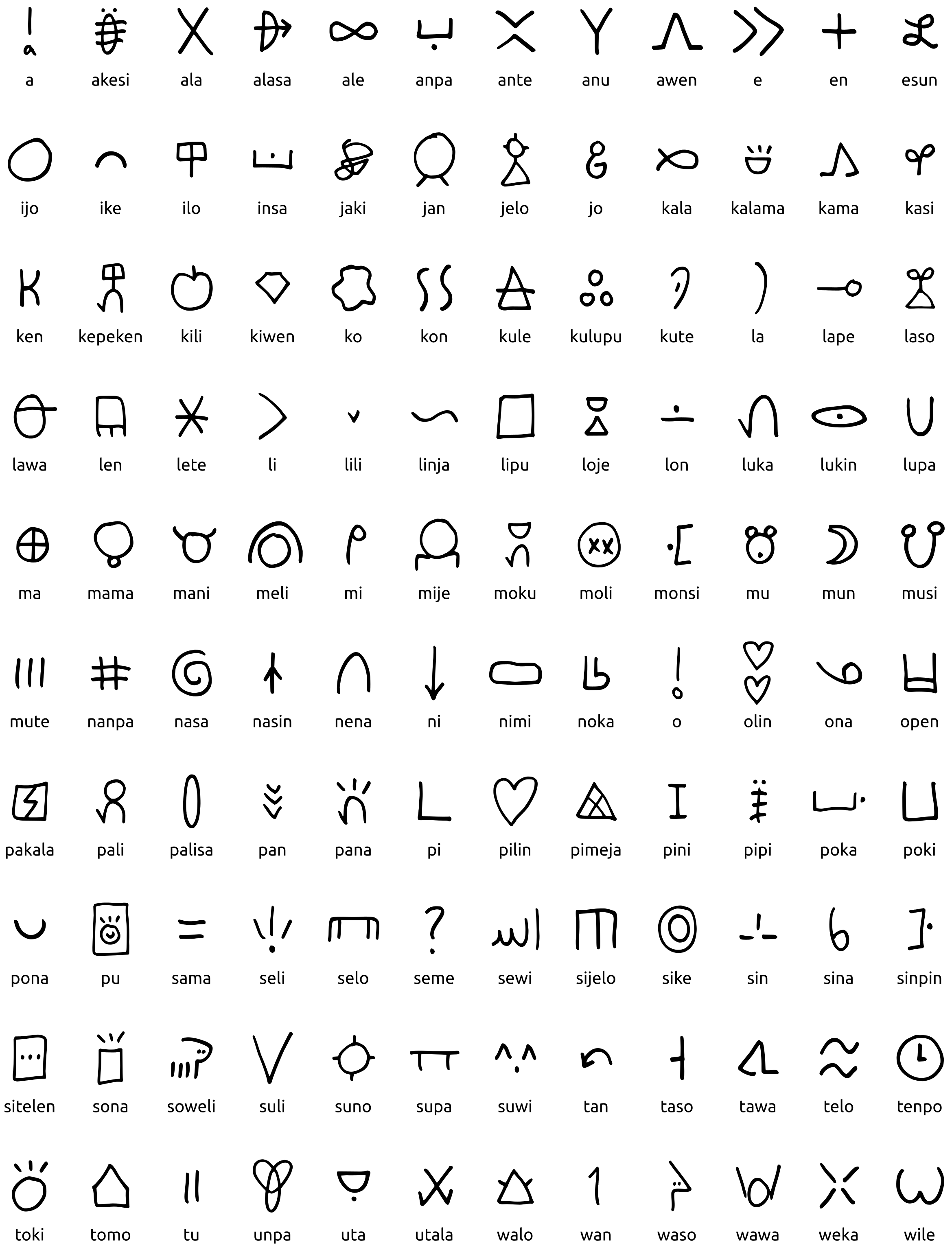
Sitelen Pona hieroglyphs from Toki Pona: The Language of Good by Sonja Lang

Sitelen Pona (lit. 'good/simple writing/drawing') is a logographic writing system devised by Lang as an alternative writing system for Toki Pona, and first published in her book Toki Pona: The Language of Good in 2014. As a logography, each word is represented by its own symbol. It has been described as "a hieroglyphic-like script that makes use of squiggles and other childlike shapes".

Symbols representing a single adjective may be written inside or above the symbol for the preceding word that they modify. The symbol of the language is written in Sitelen Pona, with the symbol (pona) written inside the symbol (toki).

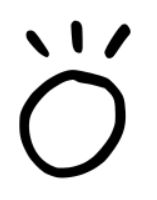
toki (language)

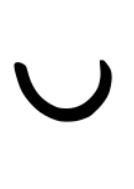
pona (good, simple)

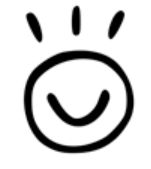
toki pona (the language of good)

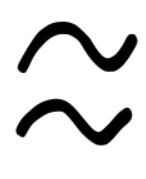
telo (water, liquid)

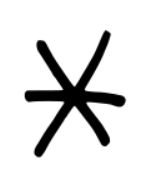
lete (cold)

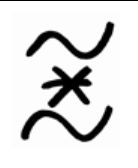
telo lete (cold water)

=== Sitelen Sitelen ===
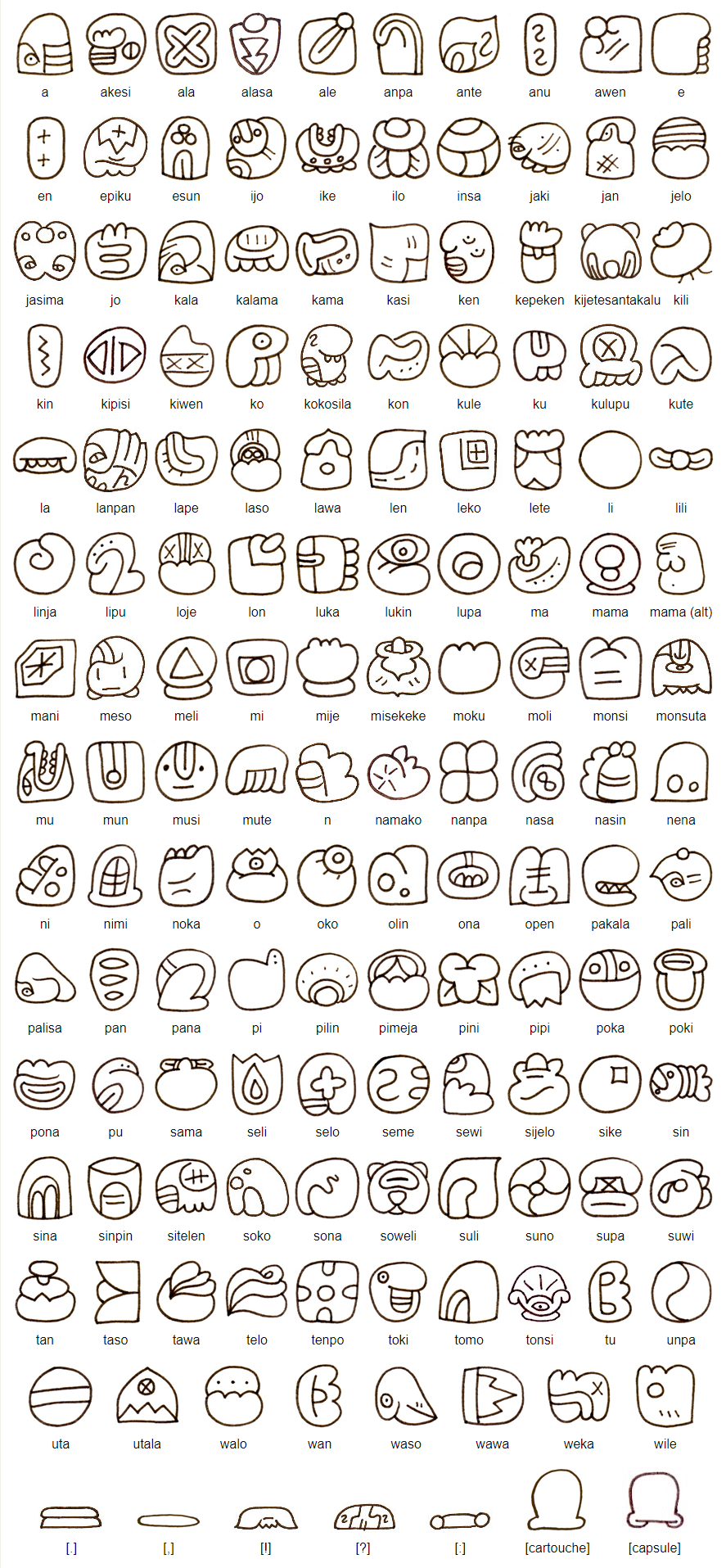
The word symbols and punctuation of Sitelen Sitelen

Sitelen Sitelen (lit. 'drawn writing'), alternatively known as sitelen suwi (lit. 'cute writing'), is a mixed writing system for Toki Pona created by Jonathan Gabel. This more elaborate non-linear system combines a logographic script with an abugida for writing syllables (especially for proper names). The complex artful designs of the glyphs are chosen to help people who use this writing system to slow down and explore how not only the language but also the method of communication can influence their thinking.

Sitelen Sitelen's overall aesthetics are inspired by US west-coast comix artists such as Jim Woodring and US east-coast graffiti artists such as Kenny Scharf. The designs of many individual characters are inspired by characters and principles from various other writing systems, including Egyptian hieroglyphs, Linear B, Chinese characters, Maya script, Mi'kmaw hieroglyphs, Dongba symbols, as well as early Pagan and Christian signs and symbols.

jan
(person, people)

ale
(all)

li
(particle)

kepeken
(use)

e
(particle)

toki
(language)

sama
(same)

== Grammar ==
Toki Pona's word order is subject–verb–object. The particle li introduces the predicate (marking the main verb phrase, including any preverbs), and the particle e introduces direct objects. Toki Pona is head-initial: a noun or verb is followed by its modifiers.

Some words are grammatical particles, while the others are content words with lexical meanings. The content words do not fall into most traditional parts of speech; they may be used as nouns, verbs, modifiers, or interjections. A content word's position in a sentence and phrase determines its role, allowing the limited number of words to serve many purposes. Thus, the word moku means "to eat" in the verb position following li, but means "food" (that which is eaten) in a noun position, and might mean "edible" (of or relating to eating) as an adjective.

Toki Pona has more complicated sentence structures as well. There are closed classes of content words that can act as preverbs and prepositions in specific parts of a sentence. Preverbs are catenative and are inserted between li and the main verb. Prepositional phrases follow the objects. The particle la ends a phrase or clause that comes before the subject to add additional context.

=== Sentence structures ===
A sentence may be an interjection, statement, wish/command, or question. While the exclamation and question marks are often used for clarity, they do not affect the meaning of the sentence. Instead, the type of sentence is an inherent feature defined by words.

For example, interjections such as a, ala, ike, jaki, mu, pakala, pona, toki, etc. can stand alone as a sentence.

Full sentences all follow the subject–predicate order with an optional la phrase at the beginning. In statements, the word li precedes the predicate unless the subject is mi or sina. The marker e comes before direct objects. More li and e markers can present more predicates and direct objects respectively. Vocative phrases come before the main sentence and are marked with o at the end of the phrase, after the addressee. o at the start of a sentence indicates an imperative. It can also replace li, or come after the subjects mi or sina, to indicate the subjunctive.

There are two ways to form yes–no questions in Toki Pona. One method is to use the A-not-A construction, "verb ala verb", in which ala comes in between a duplicated verb, auxiliary verb, or other predicates. Another way is to put the question tag anu seme? (lit. 'or what?') after the phrase being inquired about.

Non-polar questions are formed by replacing the unknown information with the interrogative word seme.

=== Pronouns ===
Toki Pona has four basic pronouns: mi (first person), sina (second person), ona (third person), and ni (demonstrative). As with content words in general, number and gender are not obligatorily marked, but can be specified with additional modifiers to the pronouns.

=== Nouns ===
Noun phrases express concepts beyond Toki Pona's basic vocabulary. Each Sitelen Pona symbol in the above image represents one word.

With such a small vocabulary, Toki Pona relies heavily on noun phrases, where a noun is modified by a following word, to make more complex meanings. A typical example is combining jan (person) with utala (fight) to make jan utala (fighter, soldier, warrior).

Nouns do not decline according to number; jan can mean person, people, humanity, somebody depending on context. Adding wan, tu, or mute as needed specifies singular, dual, or plural, respectively.

Toki Pona does not use isolated proper nouns; instead, they must modify a preceding noun. For this reason, they may be called "proper adjectives" or simply "proper words" instead of "proper nouns". For example, names of people and places are used as modifiers of the common word for "person" and "place", e.g. ma Kanata (lit. 'Canada land') or jan Lisa (lit. 'Lisa person').

=== Modifiers ===
Phrases in Toki Pona are head-initial; modifiers always come after the word that they modify. Therefore, soweli utala (lit. 'animal of fighting'), can be a fighting animal, whereas utala soweli (lit. 'fighting of animal'), can mean animal war.

When a second modifier is added to a phrase, for example jan pona mute, it modifies all that comes before it, so jan pona mute might mean many good people, with both pona (good) and mute (many) modifying jan (person). The particle pi is placed before two or more modifiers to group them into another phrase that functions as a unit to modify the head: In jan pi pona mute, pona mute as a unit means much goodness, to together mean very good person. mute modifies pona, and pona mute as a whole modifies jan.

Demonstratives, numerals, and possessive pronouns come after the head like other modifiers.

=== Verbs ===
Toki Pona does not inflect verbs according to person, tense, mood, or voice, as the language features no inflection whatsoever. Person is indicated by the subject of the verb; time is indicated through context or by a temporal adverb in the sentence.

Prepositions can be used in the predicate in place of a regular verb. This expresses the verb and preposition senses in one. For example, tawa means "to go toward" in this case.

== Vocabulary ==
Toki Pona has around 120 to 137 words. Each is polysemous, and covers a range of similar concepts, so suli not only means big or long, but also important. Their use relies heavily on context. To express more complex thoughts, the words can be combined. For example, jan pona can mean friend, although it translates to good person, and telo nasa (lit. 'strange liquid'), could be understood to mean alcohol or alcoholic beverage depending on the context. The verb to teach can be expressed by pana e sona (lit. 'give knowledge'). Essentially identical concepts can be described by different words as the choice relies on the speaker's perception and experience.

=== Colors ===
Many colors can be expressed by using subtractive colors.

Toki Pona has five words for colors: pimeja (black), walo (white), loje (red), jelo (yellow), and laso (blue and green). Although the simplified conceptualization of colors tends to exclude a number of colors that are commonly expressed in Western languages, speakers sometimes may combine these five words to make more specific descriptions of certain colors. For instance, "purple" may be represented by combining laso and loje. The phrase laso loje means "a reddish shade of blue" and loje laso means "a bluish shade of red". More specific colors may be expressed by comparison with objects, or other shared context. A common example amongst English speakers is laso kasi - combining "blue–green" with "plant" to mean green.

=== Numbers ===
Toki Pona has words for one (wan), two (tu), and many (mute). In addition, ala can mean zero (its main meaning being no, none), and ale (lit. 'all') can express an infinite or immense amount.

The simplest number system uses these five words to express any amount necessary. For numbers larger than two, speakers would use mute which means many.

A more complex system expresses larger numbers additively by using phrases such as tu wan for three, tu tu for four, and so on. This feature purposely makes it impractical to communicate large numbers. This system, described in Lang's book, also uses luka (lit. 'hand') to signify five, mute (lit. 'many') to signify twenty, and ale (lit. 'all') to signify hundred. For example, using this structure ale tu would mean 102 and mute mute mute luka luka luka tu wan would signify 78.

=== Vocabulary history ===
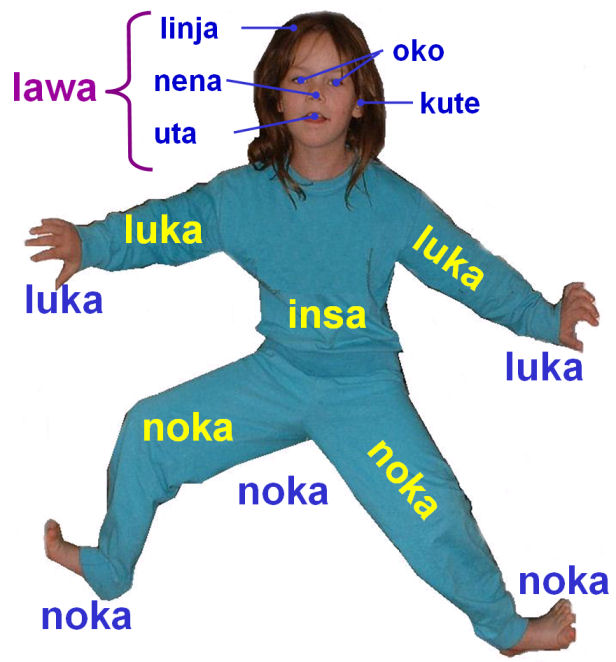
Body parts in Toki Pona. The words oko, uta, lawa, luka, and noka have Slavic, particularly Serbo-Croatian, roots: oko, usta, glava, ruka, and noga.

Some words have obsolete synonyms. For example, nena replaced kapa (protuberance) early in the language's development for unknown reasons. Later, the pronoun ona replaced iki (he, she, it, they), which was sometimes confused with ike (bad). Similarly, ali was added as an alternative to ale (all) to avoid confusion with ala (no, not) among people who reduce unstressed vowels, though both forms are still used.

Originally, oko meant eye and lukin was used as a verb to see. In Toki Pona: The Language of Good, the meanings were merged into lukin, oko being the alternative.

Words that were simply removed from the lexicon include leko (block, stairs), monsuta (monster, fear), majuna (old), kipisi (cut), and pata (sibling). These words were considered outdated because they were not included in the official book. However, oko, leko, monsuta, and kipisi retained enough usage in the community that they were re-included in the lexicon as nimi ku suli (lit. 'major Toki Pona Dictionary words') in Toki Pona Dictionary. (Note: Lang 2021, p. 22.)

Besides nena and ona, which replaced existing words, a few words were added to the original 118: pan (grain, bread, pasta, rice), esun (market, shop, trade), alasa (hunt, gather), and namako (extra, additional, spice), another word for sin (new, fresh).

=== Provenance ===
Origin language of Toki Pona words (Note: Only words that were published in Toki Pona: The Language of Good are counted.)
1. Finnish 16 (13.2%)
2. Tok Pisin 16 (13.2%)
3. Esperanto 13 (10.7%)
4. Serbo-Croatian 13 (10.7%)
5. Dutch 11 (9.09%)
6. Acadian French 11 (9.09%)
7. Georgian 8 (6.61%)
8. English 8 (6.61%)
9. Cantonese 4 (3.31%)
10. Mandarin Chinese 4 (3.31%)
11. other languages (Note: Lojban, Japanese, Tongan, and Welsh each originate one word.) 4 (3.31%)
12. multiple languages 8 (6.61%)
13. onomatopoeia 3 (2.48%)
14. a priori 1 (0.83%)
15. unknown 1 (0.83%)

Most Toki Pona words come from English, Tok Pisin, Finnish, Georgian, Dutch, Acadian French, Esperanto, and Serbo-Croatian, with a few from Chinese (Mandarin and Cantonese).

Many of these derivations are transparent. For example, toki (speech, language) is similar to Tok Pisin tok and its English source talk, while pona (good, positive), from Esperanto bona, reflects generic Romance bon, buona, English bonus, etc. However, the changes in pronunciation required by the simple phonetic system often make the origins of other words more difficult to see. The word lape (sleep, rest), for example, comes from Dutch slapen and is cognate with English sleep; kijetesantakalu (any animal from the superfamily Musteloidea) from Finnish kierteishäntäkarhu; kepeken (use) is somewhat distorted from Dutch gebruiken, and akesi from hagedis (lizard) is scarcely recognizable. (Because *ti is an illegal syllable in Toki Pona, Dutch di becomes si.)

Although only 14 words (12%) are listed as derived from English, a large number of the Tok Pisin, Esperanto, and other words are transparently cognate with English, raising the English-friendly portion of the vocabulary to about 30%. The portions of the lexicon from other languages are 15% Tok Pisin, 14% Finnish, 14% Esperanto, 12% Serbo-Croatian, 10% Acadian French, 9% Dutch, 8% Georgian, 5% Mandarin, 3% Cantonese; one word each from Welsh, Tongan (an English borrowing) and Akan, four phonesthetic words (two which are found in English, one from Japanese, and one which was made up); and one other made-up word (the grammatical particle e).

=== Signed Toki Pona and luka pona ===
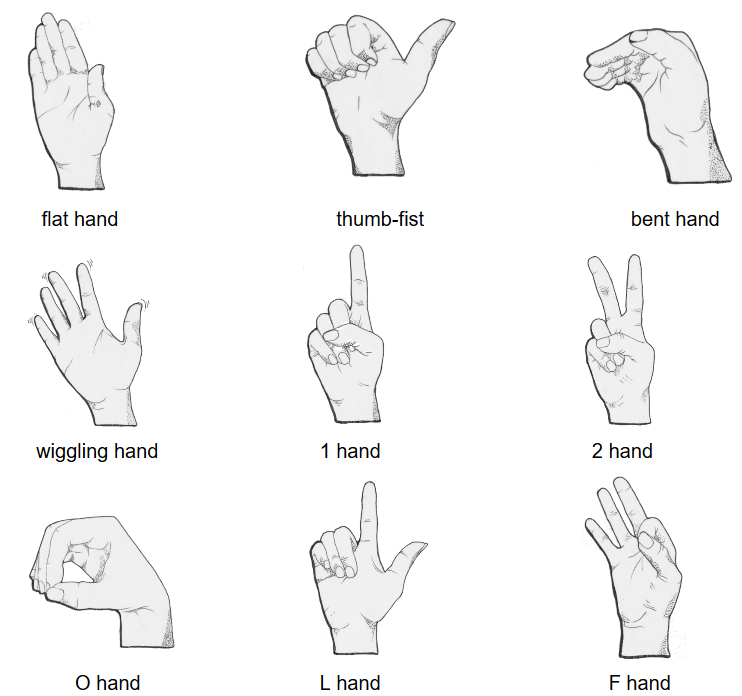
Hand shapes of Signed Toki Pona and Luka Pona

Signed Toki Pona, or toki pona luka, is a manually coded form of Toki Pona. Each word and letter has its own sign, which is distinguished by the handshape, location of the hand on the body, palm or finger orientation, and the usage of one or both hands. Most signs are performed with the right hand at the required location. A few signs, however, are performed with both hands in a symmetrical way. To form a sentence, each of the signs is performed using the grammar and word order of Toki Pona.

A more naturalistic constructed sign language called luka pona also exists, and is more widely used in the Toki Pona community than toki pona luka. It is a separate language with its own grammar, but has a vocabulary that generally parallels Toki Pona. luka pona's signs have increased iconicity as compared to toki pona luka, and many signs are loan-words from natural sign languages. Its grammar is subject-object-verb, and, like natural sign languages, it makes use of classifier constructions and signing space. In Toki Pona Dictionary, Sonja Lang recommends learning luka pona instead of toki pona luka.

== Community ==
sitelen soweli: a short animated film in Toki Pona

The language is fairly well known among Esperantists, who often offer courses and conversation groups at their meetups. In 2007, Lang said that at least 100 people speak Toki Pona fluently and estimated that a few hundred have a basic knowledge of the language. One-hour courses of Toki Pona were taught on various occasions by the Massachusetts Institute of Technology during their Independent Activities Period.

The language is used mainly online on social media, in forums, and other online groups. Users of the language are spread out across multiple platforms. A Yahoo! group existed from about 2002 to 2009, when it moved to a forum on a phpBB site.

The largest groups exist on Facebook, Discord, and Reddit. Two large groups exist on Facebook: one designated for conversation in Toki Pona and English, and the other for conversation in only Toki Pona. The former of the two is the more popular.

Memrise has user-created materials for learning Toki Pona.

In-person meetups have been organized by the community, including in Sarajevo, Vienna, Maastricht, Berlin, Seattle, and Amsterdam.

== Literature ==
The first issue of lipu tenpo

There are a few published books and many other works in Toki Pona. Most of the published works are language-learning books for beginners like akesi seli lili and meli olin moli. Many other works are translations of original literature in other languages.

Starting in 2020, a group has been working on and publishing a zine in Toki Pona called lipu tenpo (lit. 'book of time'), and it is officially registered as a zine in the United Kingdom.

== Sample texts ==
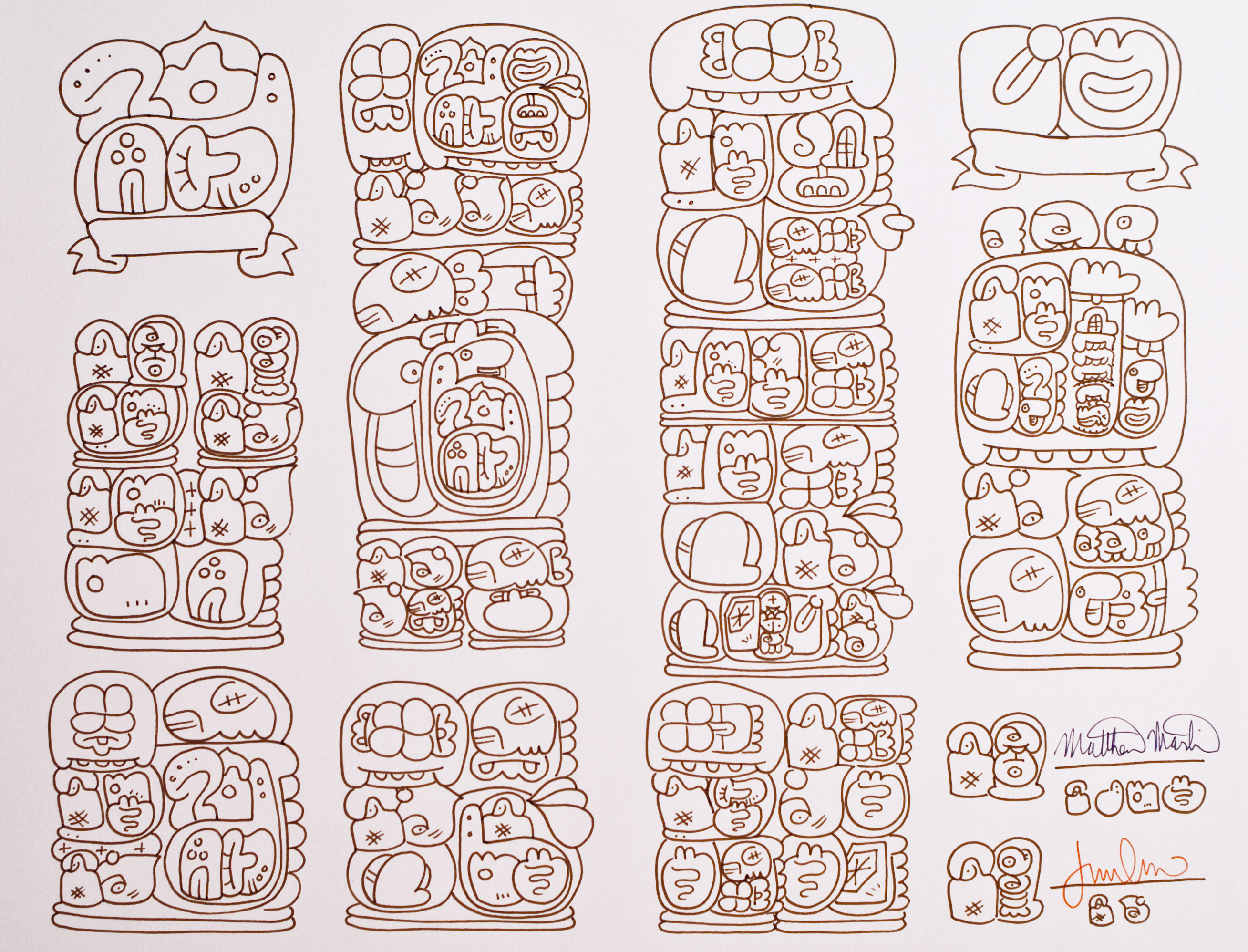
A legal contract in Sitelen Sitelen, created in 2012 by Jonathan Gabel

=== tenpo li lili ===
An original poem about time by jan Jasun, which won first place in a 2023 poetry contest.

ona li wawa li lawa li tawa
ali la ona li ken awen ala
ona li mute li suli li lon
li kama e moli
li weka e kon
tenpo
li lili
e musi e mi
e ken pali ali pi jan pali ni
tenpo li moku e tenpo mi sona
mi wile e tenpo tan wile mi pona

=== jan Sitata (excerpt) ===
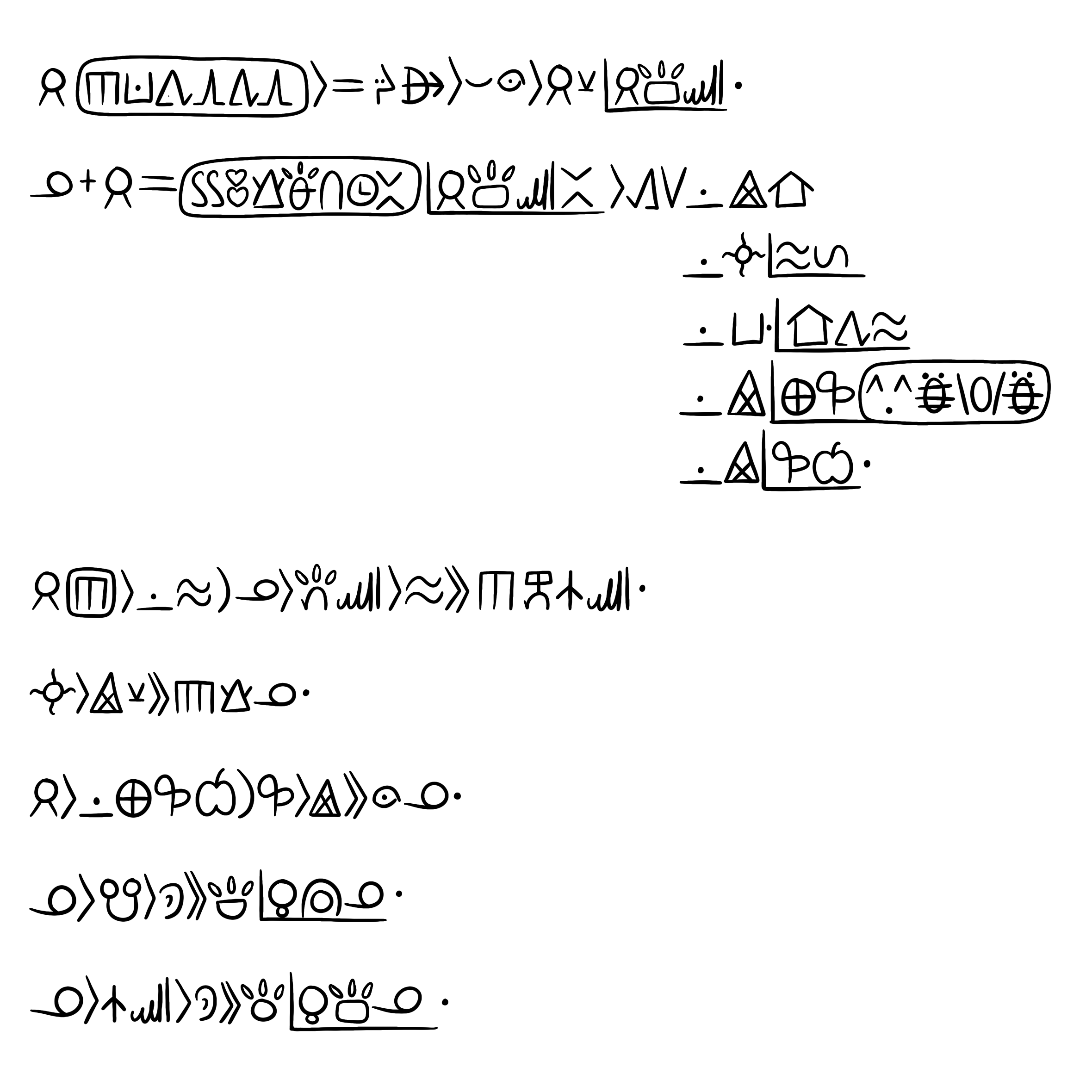
The opening lines of the novel Siddhartha by Hermann Hesse, translated by jan Kala, and written in Sitelen Pona by jan Majeka

The opening lines of jan Sitata by jan Kala, a 2022 Toki Pona translation of the novel Siddhartha by Hermann Hesse, follow below. The text uses interpuncts as markers for the ends of the sentences.

jan Sitata li sama waso alasa li pona lukin li jan lili pi jan sona sewi · ona en jan sama Kowinta pi jan sona sewi ante li kama suli lon pimeja tomo, lon suno pi telo linja, lon poka pi tomo tawa telo, lon pimeja pi ma kasi Sawa, lon pimeja pi kasi kili · jan Sitata li lon telo la ona li pana sewi li telo e sijelo kepeken nasin sewi · suno li pimeja lili e selo walo ona · jan Sitata li lon ma kasi kili la kasi li pimeja e lukin ona · ona li musi li kute e kalama pi mama meli ona · ona li nasin sewi li kute e toki pi mama sona ona ·

Back-translation in English:

Siddhartha was like a bird of prey, handsome, and the child of a religious scholar. He and his fellow Govinda, who was from another religious scholar, grew up in the shade of the house, in the sun of the river, near the boats, in the shade of the Salwald forest, in the shade of the fruit tree. When Siddhartha was in the water, he gave sacred offerings and washed himself in the holy manner. The sun tanned his pale skin. When Siddhartha was in the fruit tree grove, the trees shaded his eyes. He played, and heard the song of his mother. He followed the sacred ways, and listened to the teachings of his learned father.

== See also ==
- Engineered language
- Sitelen Pona
- List of constructed languages

== Publications ==
- Lang, Sonja (2014). Toki Pona: The Language of Good. Tawhid. ISBN 978-0978292300. OCLC 921253340.
  - Lang, Sonja (2016). Toki Pona : la langue du bien [Toki Pona: The Language of Good] (in French). Tawhid. ISBN 978-0978292355.
  - Lang, Sonja (1 December 2021). Toki Pona: Die Sprache des Guten [Toki Pona: The Language of Good] (in German). Translated by Strake, Julius. ISBN 979-8770755251. Archived from the original on 20 July 2022.
  - Lang, Sonja (1 October 2022). Tokipono: La lingvo de bono [Toki Pona: The Language of Good] (in Esperanto). Translated by van der Meulen, Spencer. Tawhid. ISBN 978-0978292355.
- Lang, Sonja (2021). Toki Pona Dictionary. Illustrated by Vacon Sartirani. Tawhid. ISBN 978-0978292362.
- Lang, Sonja (2024). The Wonderful Wizard of Oz (Toki Pona ed.). Amazon Digital Services LLC - Kdp. ISBN 978-0-9782923-7-9.
- Cárdenas, Eliazar Parra (2013). Toki pona en 76 ilustritaj lecionoj [Toki Pona in 76 illustrated lessons] (in Esperanto). Translated by Blahuš, Marek. Partizánske, Slovakia: Espero. ISBN 978-80-89366-20-0.
- Toki Pona Stories: akesi seli lili [The Little Dragon]. 2020. ISBN 979-8637271252.
- Samys, Ret (6 September 2021). ma pi kulupu tu [The Land of Two Peoples] (in German). Berlin, Germany: Holtzbrinck Publishing Group. ISBN 9783754161654. Archived from the original on 27 June 2022.
  - Samys, Ret (6 September 2021). ma pi kulupu tu [The Land of Two Peoples]. Berlin, Germany: Holtzbrinck Publishing Group. ISBN 9783754161647. Archived from the original on 27 June 2022.
