= Phaistos Disc (Unicode block) =

- Range: U+101D0..U+101FF (48 code points)
- Plane: SMP
- Scripts: Common (45 char.); Inherited (1 char.)
- Assigned: 46 code points
- Unused: 2 reserved code points

Unicode version history
- 5.1 (2008): 46 (+46)

Unicode documentation
- Code chart ∣ Web page

Phaistos Disc is a Unicode block containing the characters found on the undeciphered Phaistos Disc artefact.

== Block ==
Phaistos Disc^{[1]}^{[2]} Official Unicode Consortium code chart (PDF)
	0	1	2	3	4	5	6	7	8	9	A	B	C	D	E	F
U+101Dx	𐇐	𐇑	𐇒	𐇓	𐇔	𐇕	𐇖	𐇗	𐇘	𐇙	𐇚	𐇛	𐇜	𐇝	𐇞	𐇟
U+101Ex	𐇠	𐇡	𐇢	𐇣	𐇤	𐇥	𐇦	𐇧	𐇨	𐇩	𐇪	𐇫	𐇬	𐇭	𐇮	𐇯
U+101Fx	𐇰	𐇱	𐇲	𐇳	𐇴	𐇵	𐇶	𐇷	𐇸	𐇹	𐇺	𐇻	𐇼	𐇽		
Notes 1.As of Unicode version 17.0 2.Grey areas indicate non-assigned code points

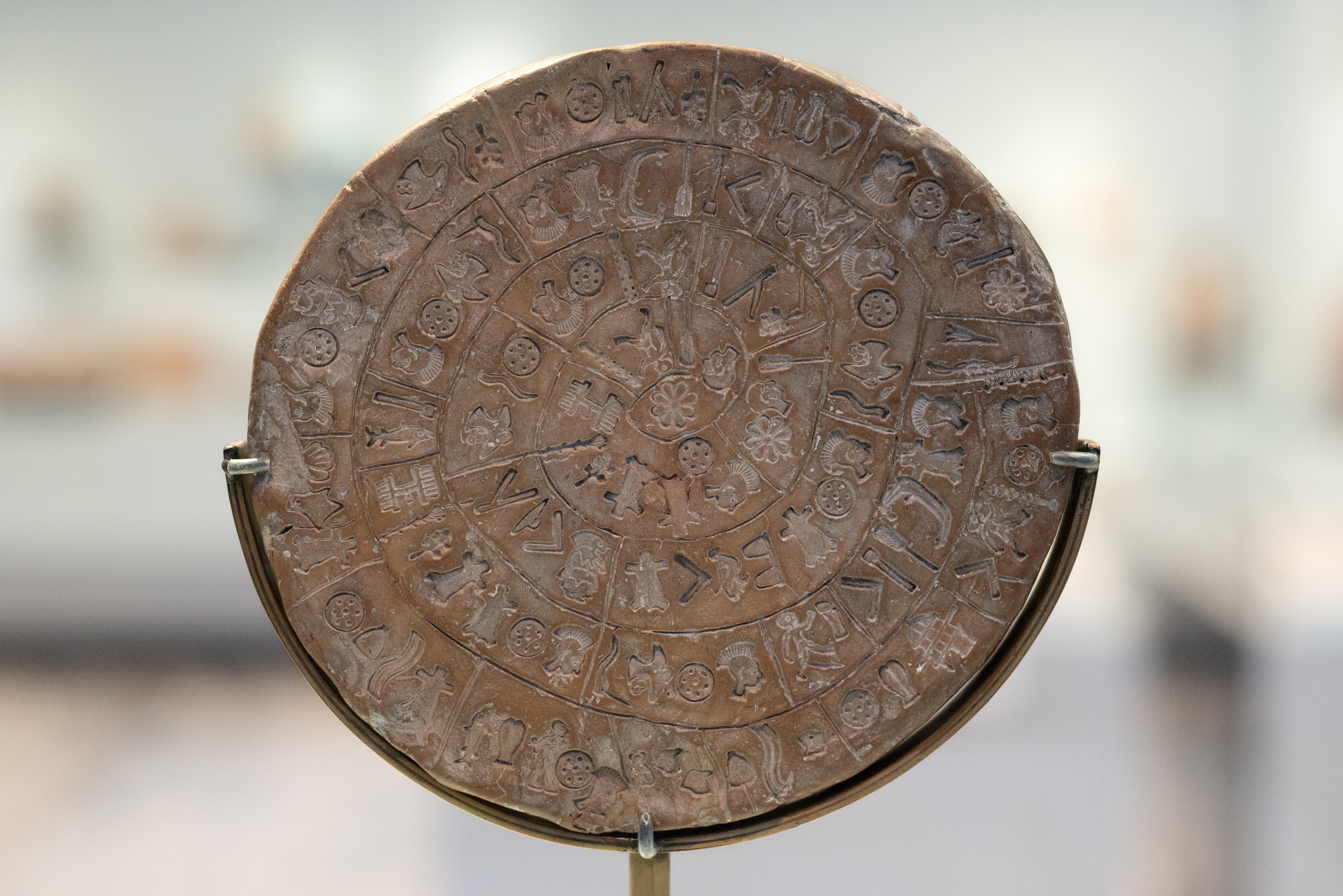
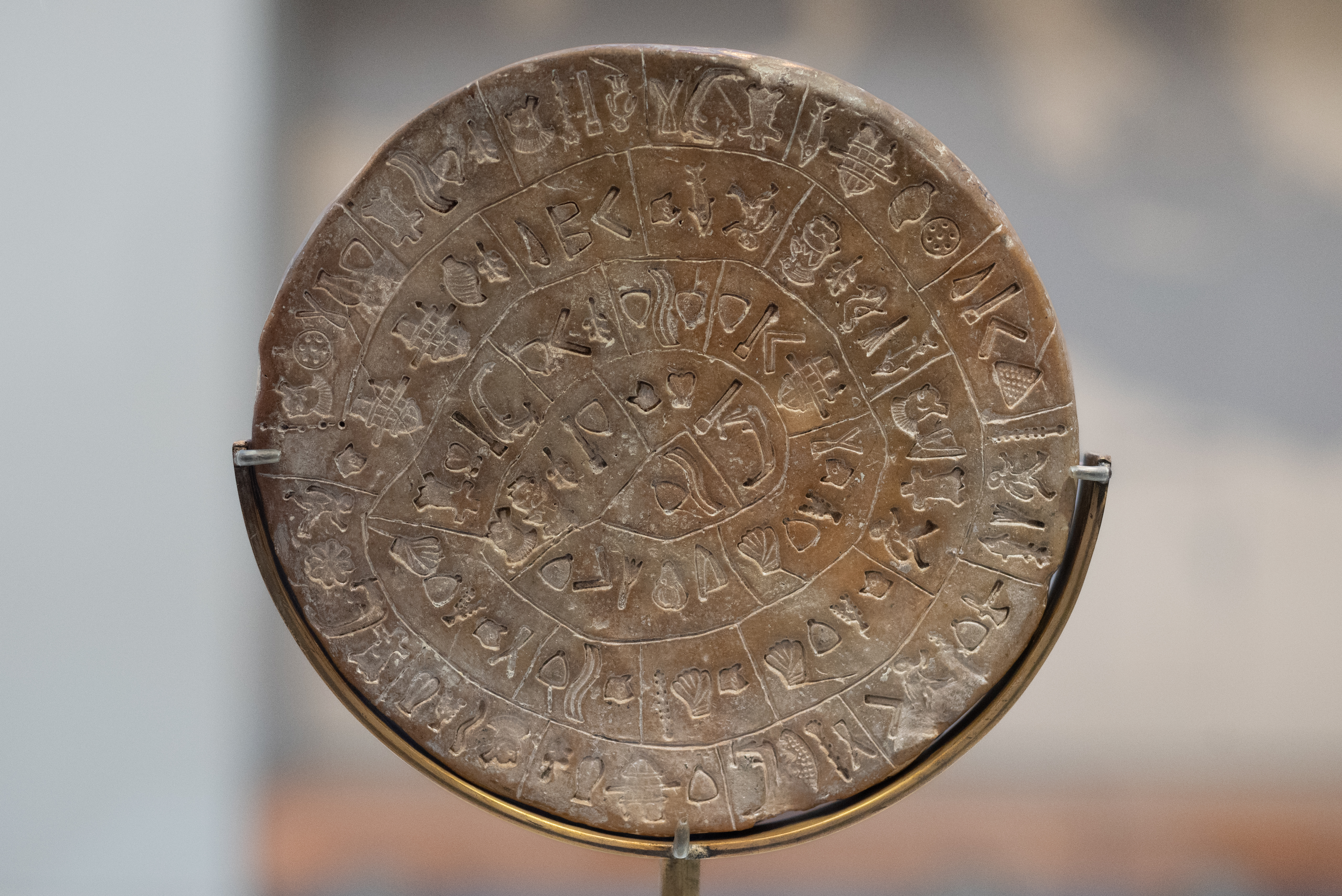
The Phaistos Disc, side A (top), side B (bottom)

While the consensus of scholars is that the text on the disk should be read in right-to-left order (counterclockwise from the edge inwards, with the start of the text at the bottom), most published works about the disk in languages with left-to-right reading order show the text in left-to-right reading order too. Taking account of this fact, the Unicode directionality property of the characters was set to "left-to-right" (LTR), and the sign images in most Unicode fonts are left-to-right reversed compared to their appearance on the disk.

Some signs occur in the disk in two or more orientations, rotated by 90 or 180 degrees. Therefore, the "normal" orientation of those signs is not known, and may be undefined; each Unicode font may make its own choice.

== History ==
The addition of Phaistos disk signs to Unicode was first proposed by John H. Jenkins in 1997, but the addition was approved only after a new proposal by Michael Everson and John Jenkins in 2006. Their proposal followed included the 45 symbols defined by Arthur Evans in 1909 (and used in practically all scholarly articles) as well as the sign modifier U+101FD PHAISTOS DISK SIGN COMBINING OBLIQUE STROKE (the short diagonal stroke added below some symbols) and the punctuation symbols U+101FE PHAISTOS DISK SIGN SEPARATOR (the radial line between "words") and U+101FF PHAISTOS DISK SIGN START OF TEXT (a radial line with five dots). The sign names and the corresponding reference images were taken from a 1995 article by Louis Godart.

The Unicode consortium adopted most of their proposal for inclusion in version 5.1 (2008), except the two alleged "punctuation" symbols U+101FE and U+101FF. These two code points are still unassigned as of Unicode version 17.0.

The following Unicode-related documents record the purpose and process of defining specific characters in the Phaistos Disc block:

Version	Final code points (Note: Proposed code points and characters names may differ from final code points and names)	Count	L2 ID	WG2 ID	Document
5.1	U+101D0..101FD	46	L2/97-105	N1575	Jenkins, John H. (1997-05-21), Overview of the Aegean scripts
5.1	U+101D0..101FD	46	L2/97-106		Jenkins, John H. (1997-05-22), Proposal to add Phaistos Disk script to ISO/IEC 10646
5.1	U+101D0..101FD	46	L2/97-288	N1603	Umamaheswaran, V. S. (1997-10-24), "8.24.1", Unconfirmed Meeting Minutes, WG 2 Meeting # 33, Heraklion, Crete, Greece, 20 June – 4 July 1997
5.1	U+101D0..101FD	46	L2/06-095R	N3066R	Everson, Michael; Jenkins, John (2006-04-01), Proposal for encoding the Phaistos Disc characters
5.1	U+101D0..101FD	46	L2/06-108		Moore, Lisa (2006-05-25), "C.8", UTC #107 Minutes
5.1	U+101D0..101FD	46		N3103 (pdf, doc)	Umamaheswaran, V. S. (2006-08-25), "M48.13", Unconfirmed minutes of WG 2 meeting 48, Mountain View, CA, USA; 2006-04-24/27
5.1	U+101D0..101FD	46	L2/07-019		McGowan, Rick (2007-01-16), Phaistos Disc Property Assignments
5.1	U+101D0..101FD	46	L2/11-126		Anderson, Deborah (2011-05-02), Phaistos Disc Glyph Errata
5.1	U+101D0..101FD	46	L2/11-166		Everson, Michael (2011-05-06), Response to L2/11-126 Phaistos Disc Errata
