= John Davie (activist) =

Scottish draper and social reformer (1800–1891)

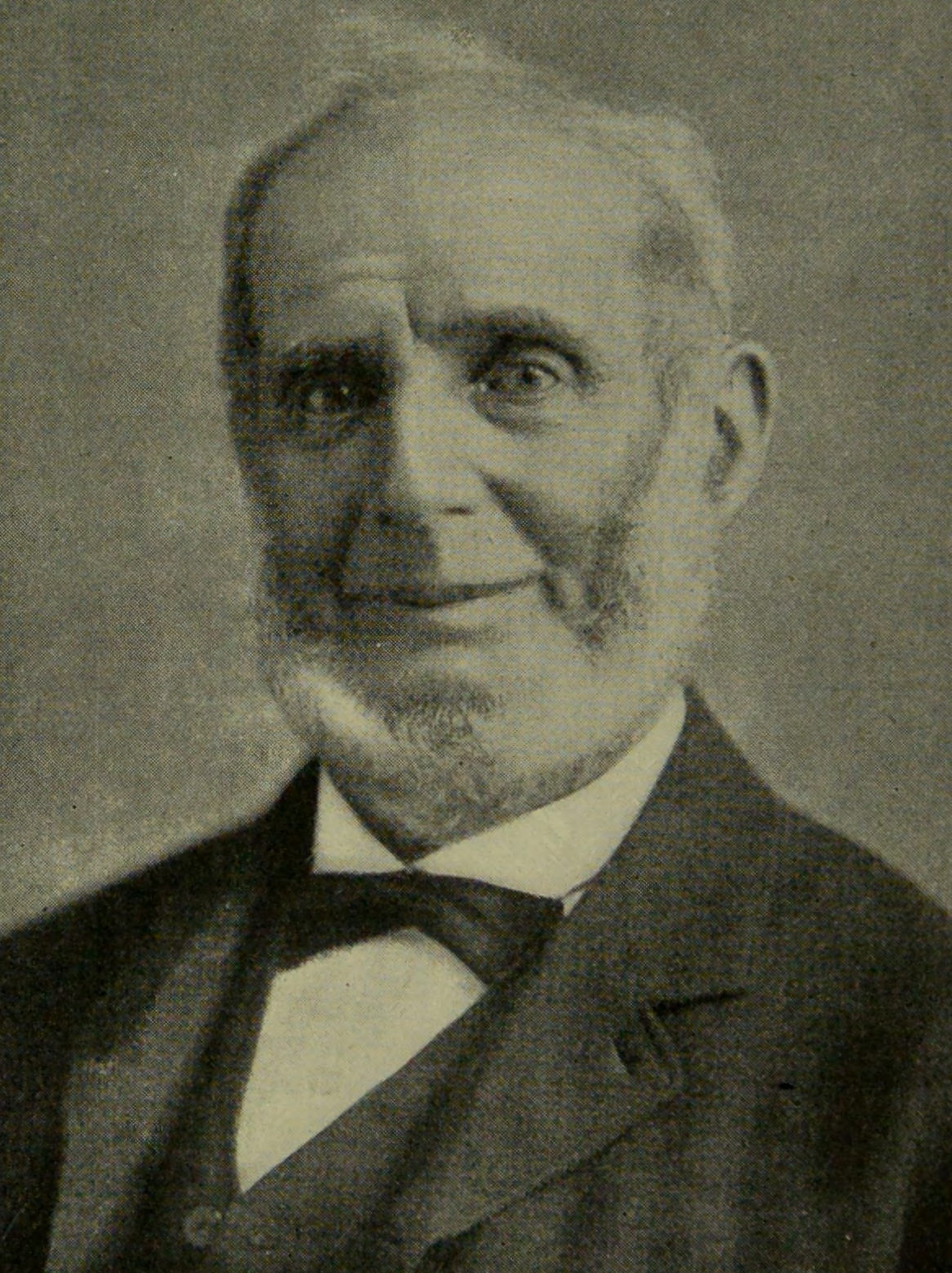
- Davie in Fifty Years of Food Reform (1898)
- Born: 13 March 1800; Butterflat, Stirling, Scotland
- Died: 4 March 1891 (aged 90); Dunfermline, Scotland
- Resting place: Kirkcaldy Old Kirk Graveyard
- Occupations: Draper; social reformer
- Years active: c. 1830 – c. 1890
- Organizations: Vegetarian Society; London Society for the Abolition of Compulsory Vaccination
- Known for: Temperance and vegetarianism advocacy
- Spouses: Margaret Smith (died 1884) Mary Livingston (m. 1890)

John Davie (13 March 1800 – 4 March 1891) was a Scottish draper and social reformer based in Dunfermline. After retiring from business, he became active in the Scottish temperance movement, including as a founder of the Dunfermline Total Abstinence Society. He was also active in vegetarianism advocacy; he was honorary secretary of the Dunfermline Vegetarian Society and served as secretary, treasurer, and later a vice-president of the Vegetarian Society. He was also a vice-president of the London Society for the Abolition of Compulsory Vaccination, and was associated with a range of other Victorian reform causes, including opposition to vivisection and capital punishment, support for Chartism and women's suffrage, and promotion of hydrotherapy, including as managing director of the Waverly Hydrotherapy Institution at Melrose.

== Biography ==
=== Early life and education ===
John Davie was born at Butterflat, a small farm near Stirling, on 13 March 1800. His father was a farmer.

Davie was educated at the parish school of St Ninians. He was an avid reader from an early age and was described as a gifted scholar.

=== Business career ===
Davie showed little interest in an agricultural career and was instead apprenticed to a draper in Stirling. After briefly working as a journeyman in Kirkcaldy and Edinburgh, he spent the fifth year of his apprenticeship in Dunfermline. There he entered into a business partnership with David Reid, which proved successful enough for Davie to retire from business 14 years later.

=== Social reform ===
Davie served as a vice-president of the London Society for the Abolition of Compulsory Vaccination and was a member of the Anti-Corn Law League.

In 1830, Davie and other members of the Dunfermline Temperance Society formed the Dunfermline Total Abstinence Society, the first of its kind in Scotland.

He opposed alcohol, tobacco, vaccination, vivisection, and capital punishment. He supported Chartism, peace, women's suffrage, and hydrotherapy.

=== Vegetarianism ===
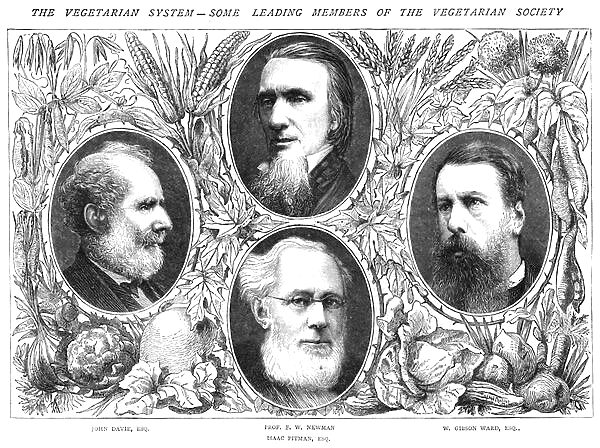
Four leading vegetarians (The Graphic, 1874), featuring Davie (left), Francis William Newman (top), Isaac Pitman (bottom), and W. Gibson Ward (right)

At the age of 46, Davie became a vegetarian after reading John Smith's Fruits and Farinacea and on the advice of a doctor, who suggested a vegetarian diet to help his dyspepsia.

Davie was honorary secretary of the Dunfermline Vegetarian Society. For a period he served as secretary of the Vegetarian Society. He also served as treasurer and later as a vice-president. Davie distributed vegetarian literature and arranged for the Society's brochures to be inserted into periodicals by booksellers.

He was one of the originators of the Waverly Hydrotherapy Institution at Melrose and served as its managing director. He promoted vegetarianism at the institution.

In 1874, The Graphic described Davie, Francis William Newman, Isaac Pitman, and W. Gibson Ward as "four leading vegetarians" in England.

The Vegetarian Society presented an address to Davie in March 1890 to mark his 90th year. In September of that year, he attended the second International Vegetarian Congress in London.

=== Personal life and death ===
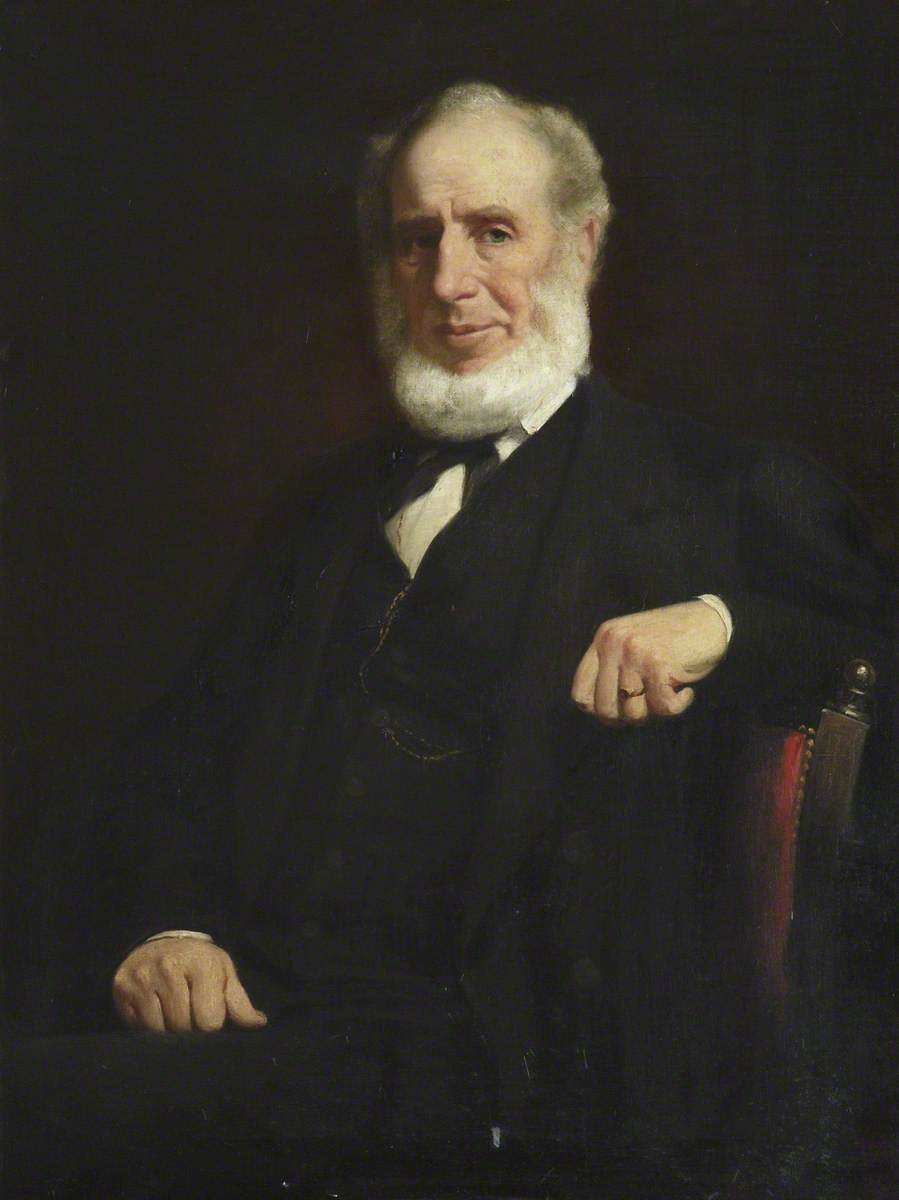
Portrait by John MacLaren Barclay

Davie married three times. His wife, Margaret Smith, was born in Kirkcaldy in 1799 and died on 22 February 1884. She was buried in Kirkcaldy Old Kirk Graveyard. His third wife was Mary Livingston, the daughter of Archibald Livingston, a Glasgow writer; they married in September 1890.

Davie served as an elder in the United Presbyterian Church.

Davie died at his home, Newlands Hill House in Dunfermline, on 4 March 1891, aged 90, after an illness of about a week. He was buried in Kirkcaldy Old Kirk Graveyard alongside his wife Margaret Smith. His books were bequeathed to a public library. Mary Livingston died on 4 March 1892 and was buried alongside him.

== See also ==
- History of vegetarianism
- Vegetarianism in the Victorian era
