= St Paul's and St George's Church =

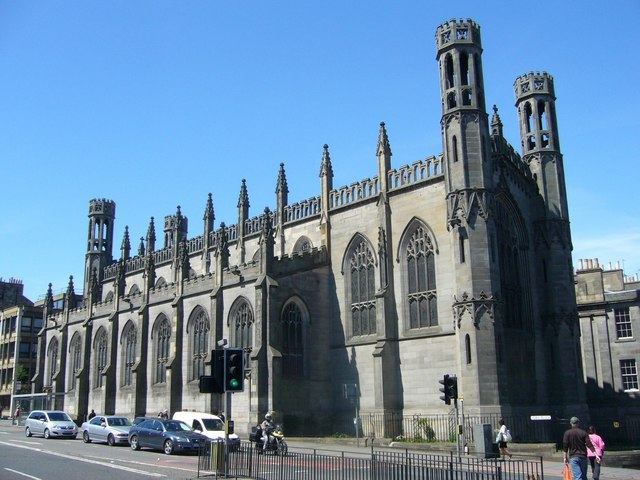
- St Paul's and St George's Church

- Location in Edinburgh
- 55°57′24.47″N 3°11′18.81″W
- Location: Edinburgh
- Country: Scotland
- Denomination: Scottish Episcopal Church
- Churchmanship: Evangelical
- Website: psandgs.org.uk

History
- Former name: St Paul's Chapel

Architecture
- Heritage designation: Category A listed building
- Designated: 1966
- Architect: Archibald Elliot
- Style: Gothic Revival nave-and-aisle
- Years built: 1816-1818

Administration
- Province: Scotland
- Diocese: Edinburgh

Clergy
- Rector: Andy Croft

St Paul's and St George's Church (known colloquially as "Ps and Gs") is an evangelical church of the Scottish Episcopal Church in central Edinburgh, Scotland. It is located on the corner of Broughton Street and York Place in the east end of Edinburgh's New Town, and is protected as a category A listed building.

The building was erected as St Paul's Church, replacing a chapel in the Cowgate. It was designed by Archibald Elliot between 1816 and 1818, and was extended by Peddie and Kinnear in the 1890s. In 1932 the congregation merged with that of St George's Church, also located on York Place. The east window is by Francis Eginton of Birmingham.

In 2008 a £5.6 million building project to improve facilities in the church was completed.

== History ==
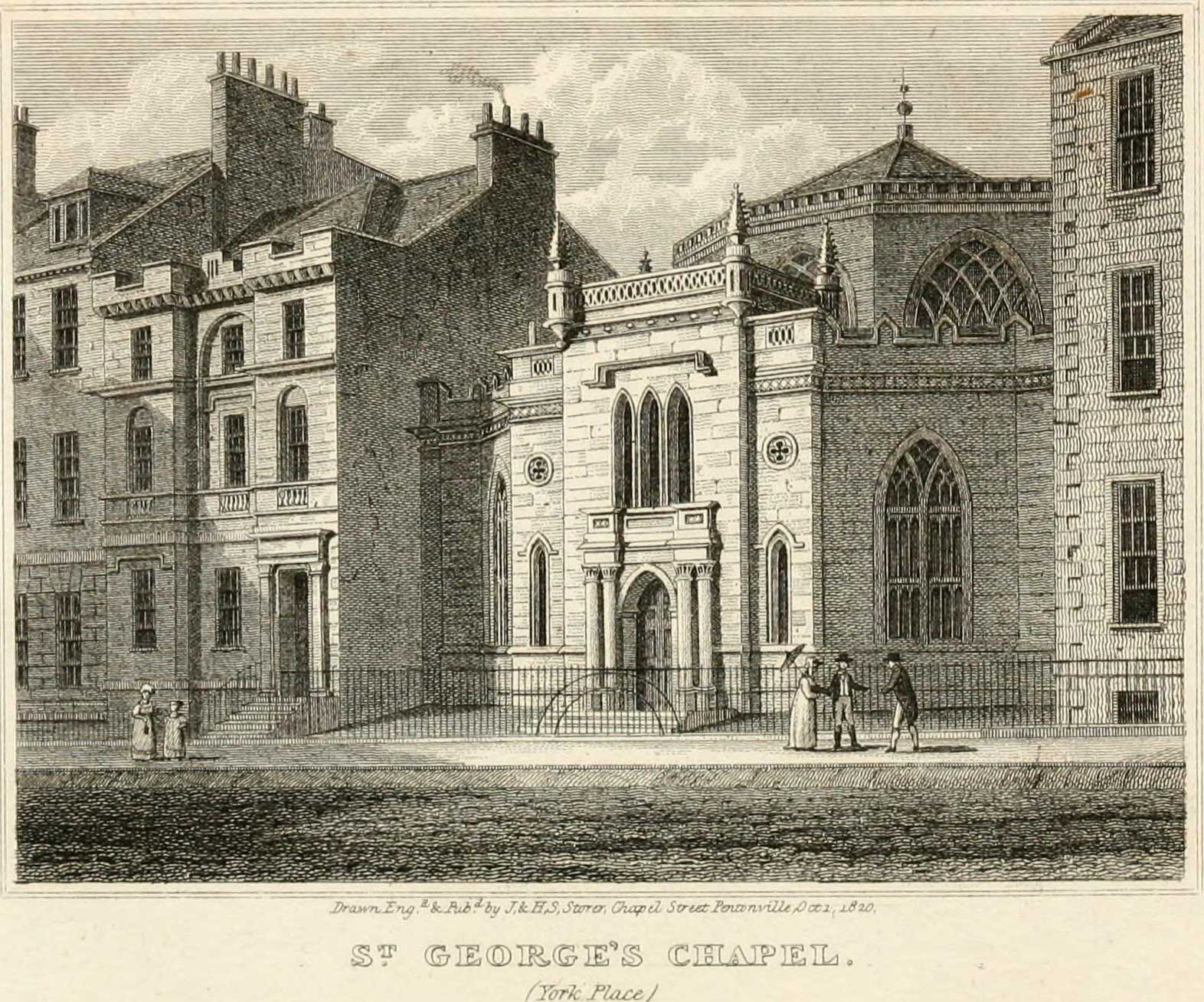
The former St George's Chapel, York Place (closed 1932)

In 18th-century Edinburgh, Episcopalians met for worship in small chapels around the city. There were three Non-Juror Chapels and three Qualified Chapels. On 18 August 1708, George Haliburton, Bishop of Aberdeen, licensed Robert Blair to be the first Episcopalian priest of a new congregation which began its life meeting in a room in Half Moon Close on the Castle Hill in Edinburgh. This new congregation was founded by John Smith, a barrister, who came to Scotland following the Union of the Parliaments in 1707, to serve as Chief Baron of the Court of Exchequer of Scotland. Rent for the new meeting house amounted to £6 per year.

The church was later made a collegiate church and as the congregation grew, John Smith looked to build a permanent place of worship, and in 1722 the New Chapel was opened near the foot of Blackfriars Wynd (now Street) in the Cowgate. In 1745, after further expansion, the congregation bought the adjoining building in order to enlarge the chapel.

In 1774, the congregation moved to their newly built church at the east end of the Cowgate (now St Patrick’s RC). Soon after, however, many of its well-to-do congregation began to move out of the Old Town into the townhouses of the emerging New Town, and it became necessary for the congregation to relocate once again. St Paul's and St John's considered uniting and building a large church on The Mound, but it was decided to have two chapels, one in the west end (St John's) and one in the east end.

The present building was built at this time. The new church, St Paul’s Chapel, was consecrated on the 30 January 1818. The architect was Archibald Elliot whose plans were based on the design of King's College Chapel, Cambridge. The first rectors of the new church were the clergyman and writer Archibald Alison, and Robert Morehead.

The building cost £12,000, raised by voluntary subscription. The pew which Walter Scott's family used may now be seen in the side chapel in St Mary's Cathedral in Palmerston Place.

The site at the east end of York Place had previously been occupied by some small buildings and backed onto Brown's Coachyard, which had been the main coach station for Edinburgh for some years. The wall at the back of the Church is the original wall behind which the horses and coaches were prepared. This trade diminished with the advent of the railways. By 1891 it was decided to alter the building and enlarge it from a Chapel into a Church. The Chancel was built, extending the Church eastwards and the door into the Church was moved further West along York Place to where the red door now is.

An Episcopalian chapel already existed on York Place, St George's, built in 1794 by James Adam. In 1932 the two neighbouring congregations amalgamated at St Paul's, which was renamed St Paul's and St George's Church. The old St George's Church was closed and the building is now in use as a casino.

Inside the Church the balconies were taken down, staircases removed and the organ moved from the West End to its current position. A new pulpit, rood screen and reredos were commissioned from John Dick Peddie and David Forbes Smith, the reredos beautifully portraying Christ with the little children and flanked by St Paul on the left and St Cuthbert on the right.

A small new chapel was made inside the old entrance. This was later dedicated to the fallen of the First World War. The current great west window, originally in the East end, was rebuilt into the West end, and a new East Window and new Chancel windows were introduced depicting a number of early Celtic saints, mostly associated with this area of Scotland. A small stained glass window from the Cowgate Chapel is in the Vestry.

The organ, by John Snetzler, was originally in the Cowgate Chapel, but was rebuilt in the York Place building by J Bruce in 1818. After several refurbishments, it was enlarged by Harrison & Harrison in 1906.

On the North-East corner there is a bell tower with a single bell, moved there in 1818, originally one of a peal of 3 bought for the coronation of Charles I at Holyrood Abbey in 1633. The bell is still operational but is no longer used.

In the later years of the 20th century, numbers attending St Paul's and St George's had dwindled. In 1985, the Bishop of Edinburgh Alastair Haggart installed Rev Roger Simpson as rector and members from the Evangelical Episcopal Church of St Thomas in Corstorphine came to the York Place church. Within 10 years, the church congregation had grown significantly as a result of the change in churchmanship to a more Evangelical style.

=== Rectors ===
Past rectors of St Paul's (and later St Paul's and St George's) Church have included:

- Archibald Alison (1818-1830)
- Robert Morehead (1818-)

? Wilson -1897 Earnest Hilton Molesworth 1897-1905

- William Henderson Begg (1932–34)
- Theodore Edgar Keyden (1934–37)
- Claude Philip Moor (1938–45)
- William Benjamin Harvey (1945–55)
- Thomas Veitch (1956–84)
- Roger Westgarth Simpson (1985–95)
- David Richards (1995-2026)
- Andy Croft (2026-)

== Architecture ==
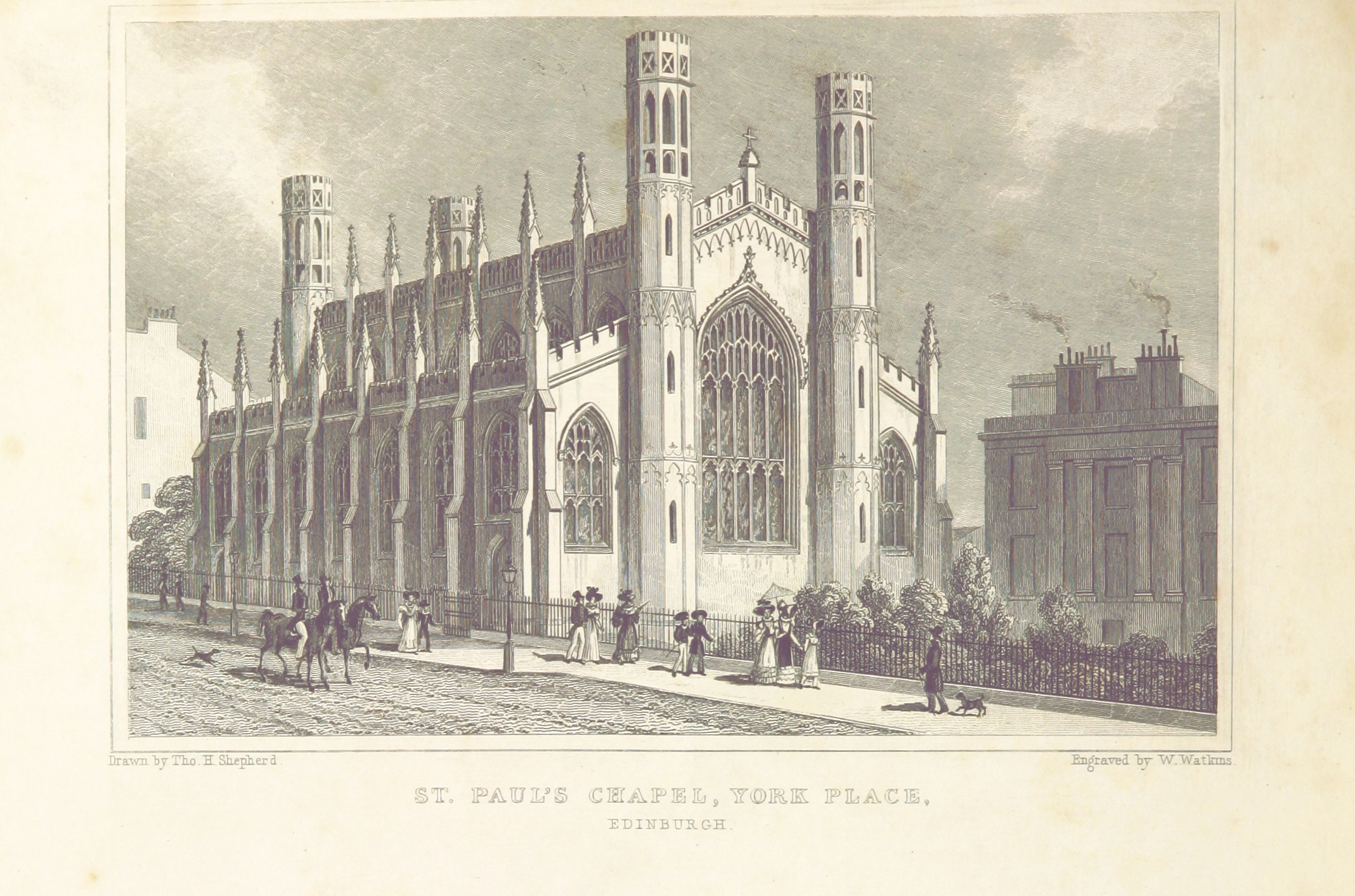
Archibald Elliot's St Paul's Chapel (prior to the 1892 extension)

St Paul's and St George's Church is a noted structure in the early part of Edinburgh's New Town, and stands out as one of the few Gothic Revival buildings in an area largely made up of Georgian Neoclassical architecture. The Scottish architect Archibald Elliot began work on the new church of St Paul in 1816. Designing it in a Perpendicular style on a nave-and-aisle floorplan, he modelled the building on King's College Chapel, Cambridge, complete with crocketted pinnacles and buttresses and four octagonal turrets on the corners, inspired by those on St Mary's Church, Beverley in Yorkshire. The exterior sandstone is richly decorated with Gothic strapwork and topped with a crenellated parapet.

The interior consists of a long nave flanked by tall aisles and arched stone columns. On the north wall is a stone tabernacle topped with a Gothic ogee arch, designed by David Bryce. There are marble monuments by Scottish sculptors Sir John Steell and David Watson Stevenson.

In 1891–2, the east end of the church was extended by Peddie and Kinnear, turning the original chancel into a choir. The renovating architects also added a rib-vaulted south-east porch, installed new furnishings and removed the aisle galleries.

A growing congregation created a need to accommodate a larger number of worshippers, and in the early 21st century a project was undertaken by Lee Boyd architects to renovate the church. New glass-fronted aisle galleries were constructed (re-instating the interior balconies that had been removed in the 1890s) and doubling the capacity of the church. A steel and glass entrance pavilion was also constructed outside the west door, and the church hall was demolished and replaced. The £5.6 million building project was completed in 2008 was named Building of the Year in the 2009 Edinburgh Architectural Association Awards.

=== Architectural elements ===
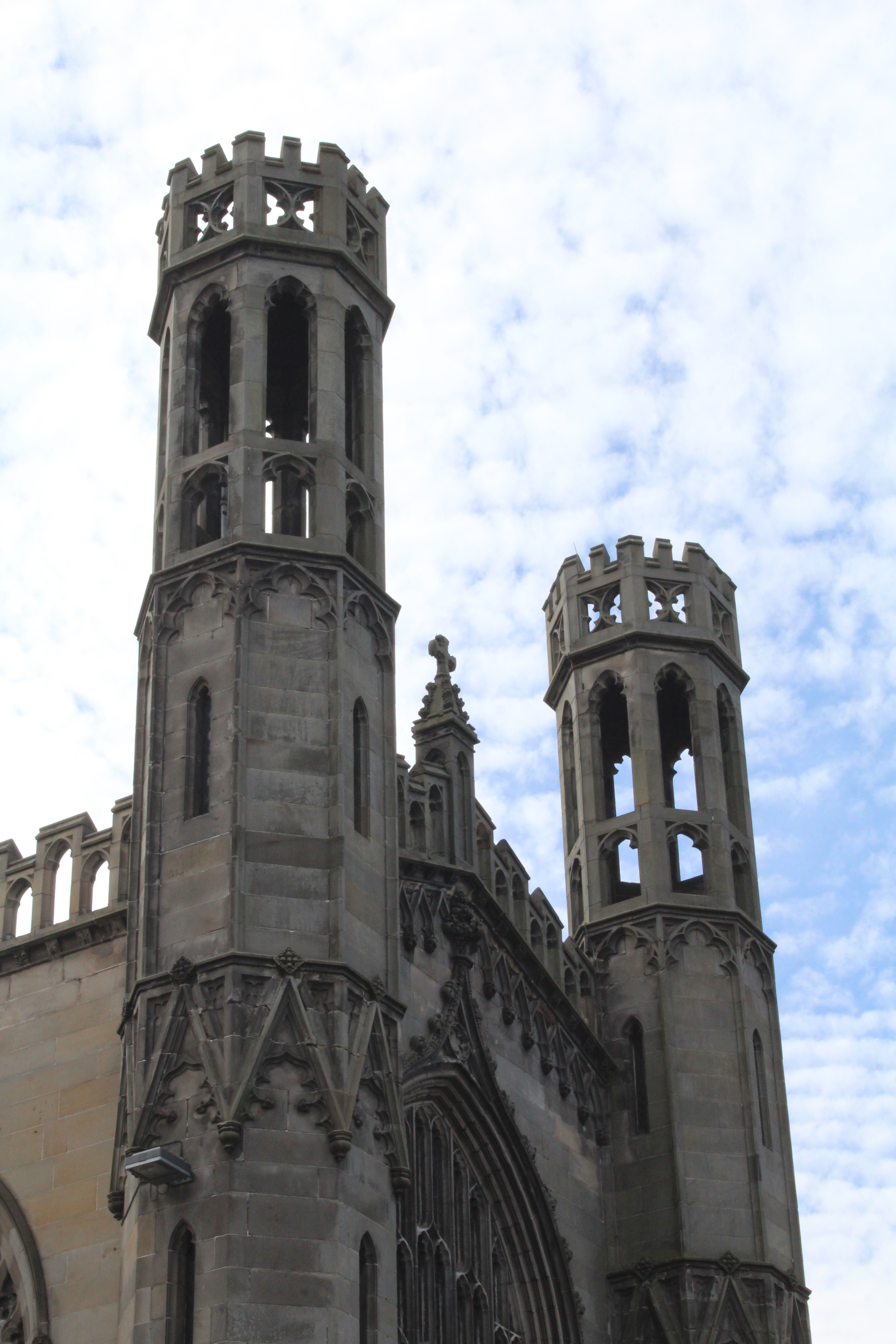
Elliot's octagonal turrets on St Paul's and St George's

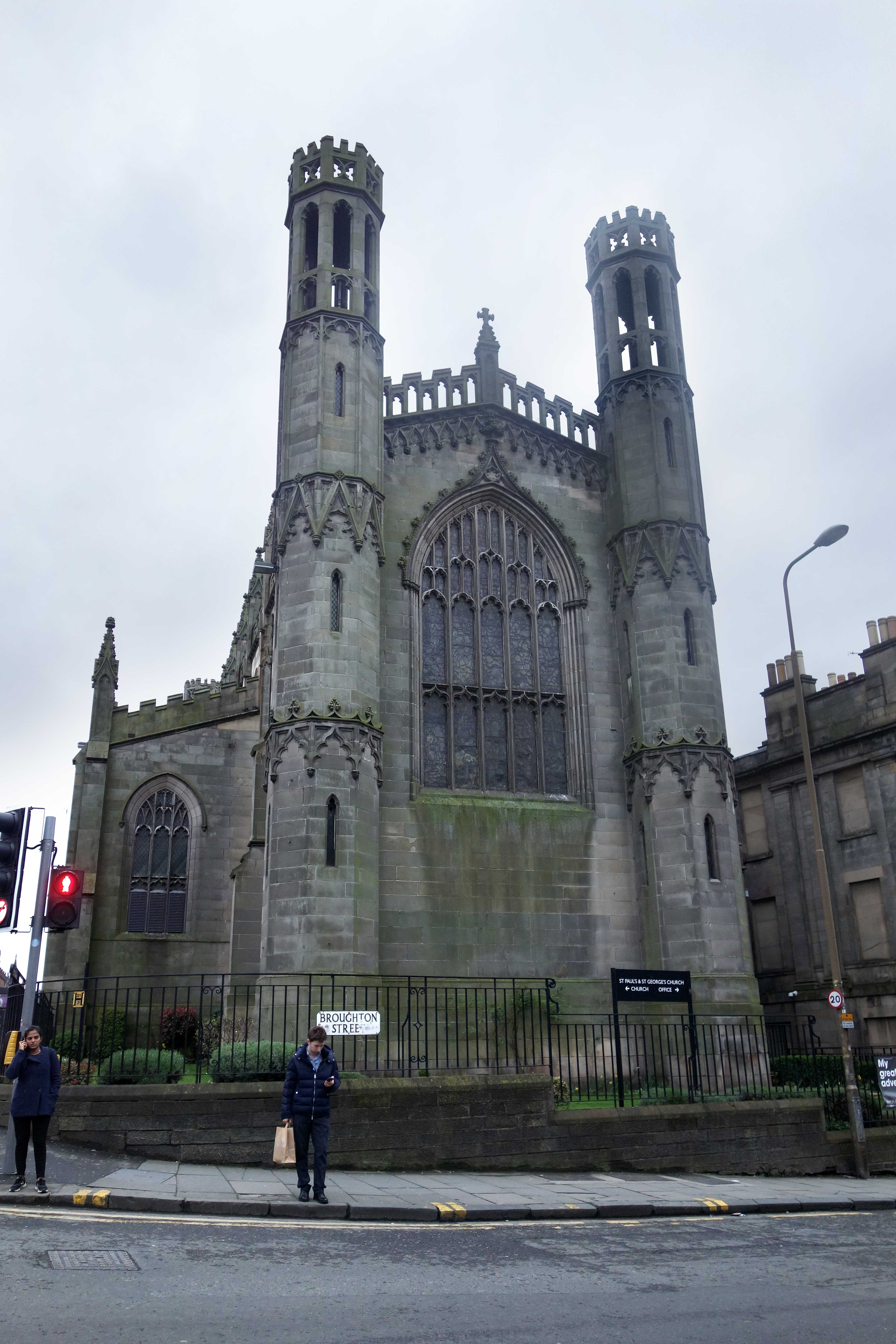
The east window of Peddie and Kinnear's 1892 extension

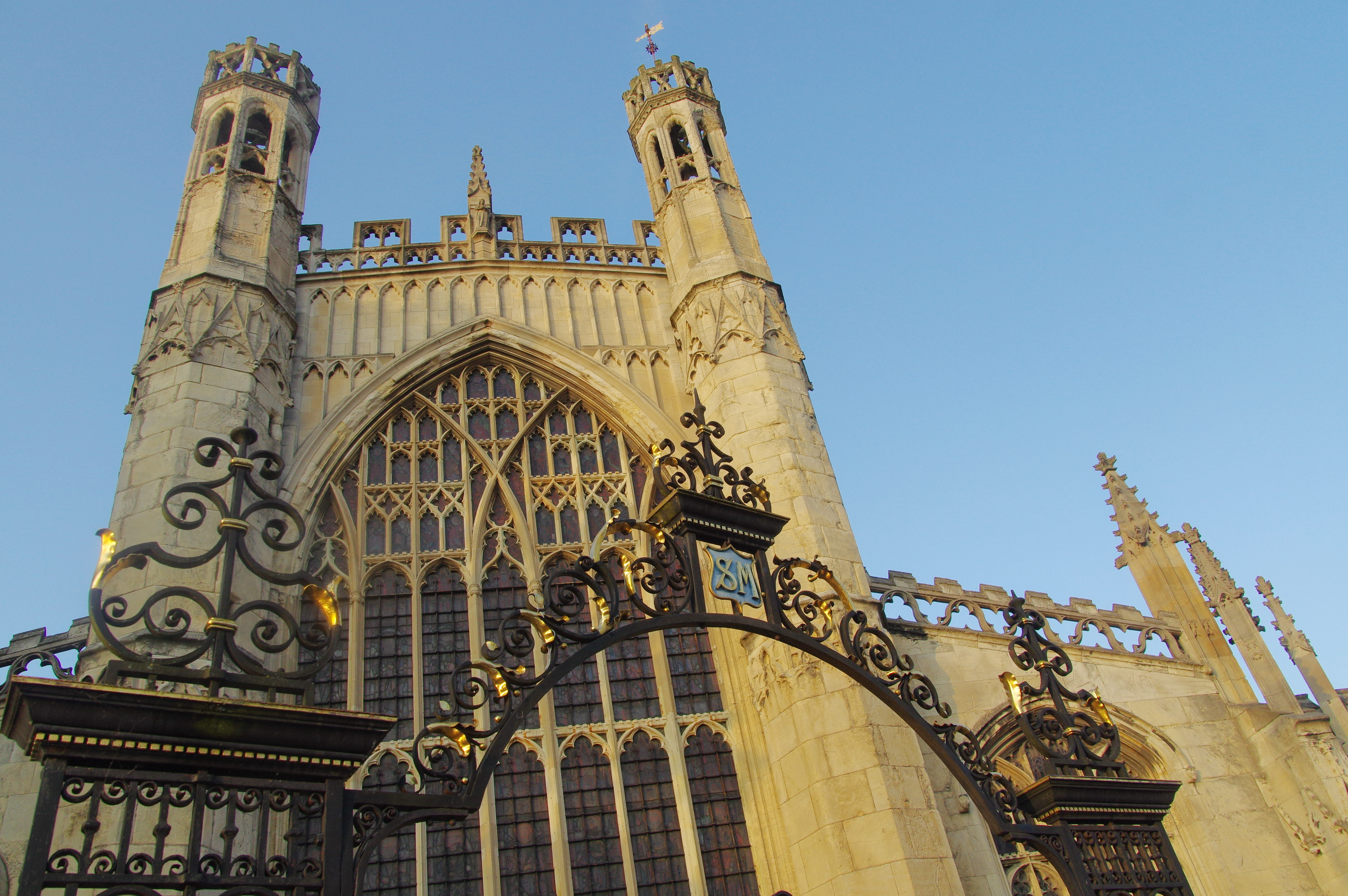
Octagonal turrets on St Mary's Beverley

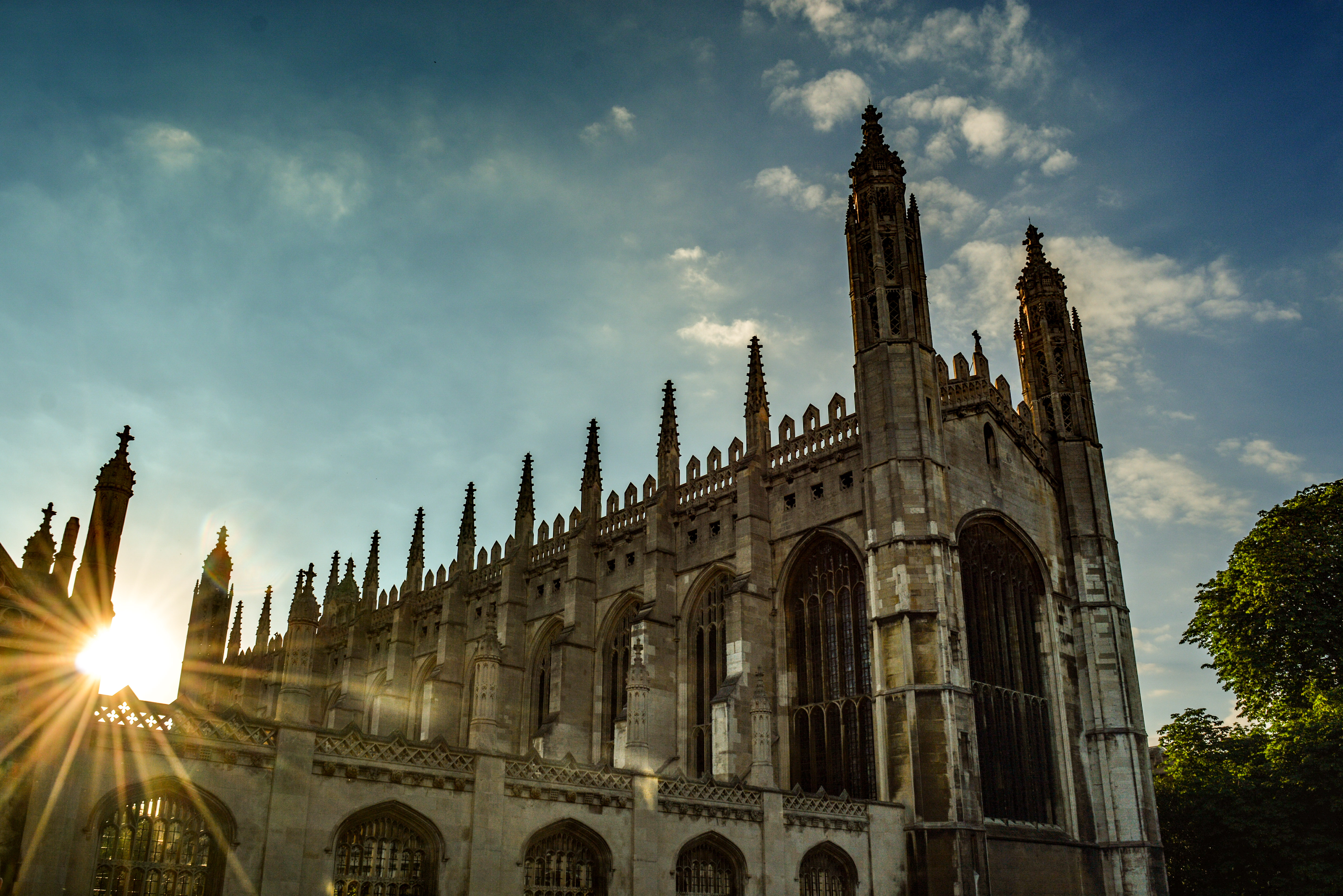
The nave-and-aisle chapel at King's College, Cambridge

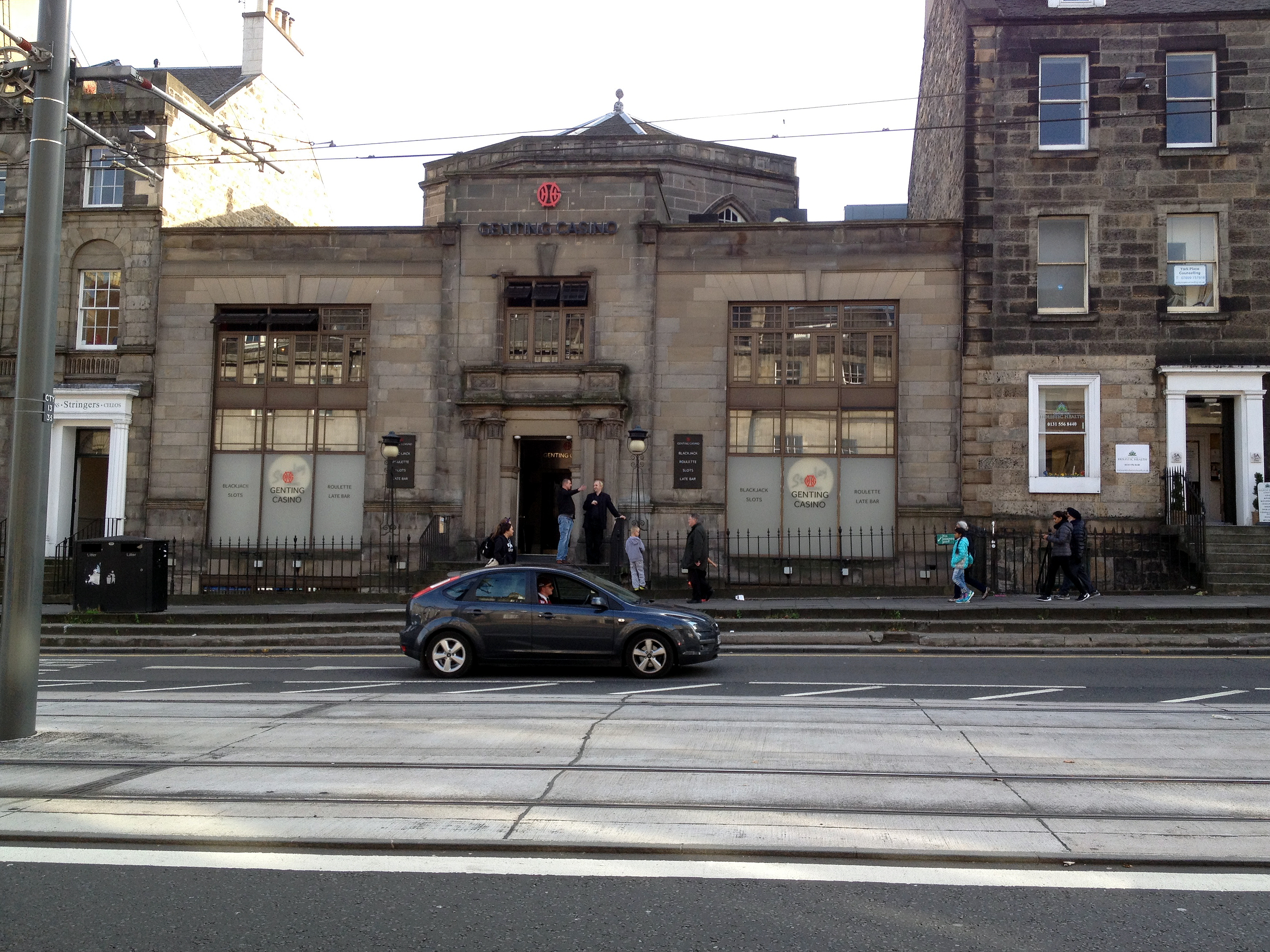
St George's Chapel, York Place, now a casino

== Notable members ==
- Thomas Suther
