= Isaac Pitman =

British linguist (1813–1897)

Sir Isaac Pitman
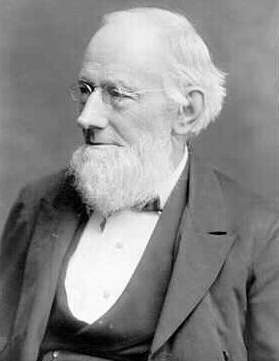
- Born: 4 January 1813; Trowbridge, Wiltshire, England
- Died: 22 January 1897 (aged 84); Bath, Somerset, England
- Occupations: Publisher, teacher
- Known for: Inventing Pitman shorthand
- Children: 2
- Relatives: Benjamin Pitman (brother); Jacob Pitman (brother); Frederick Pitman (brother)

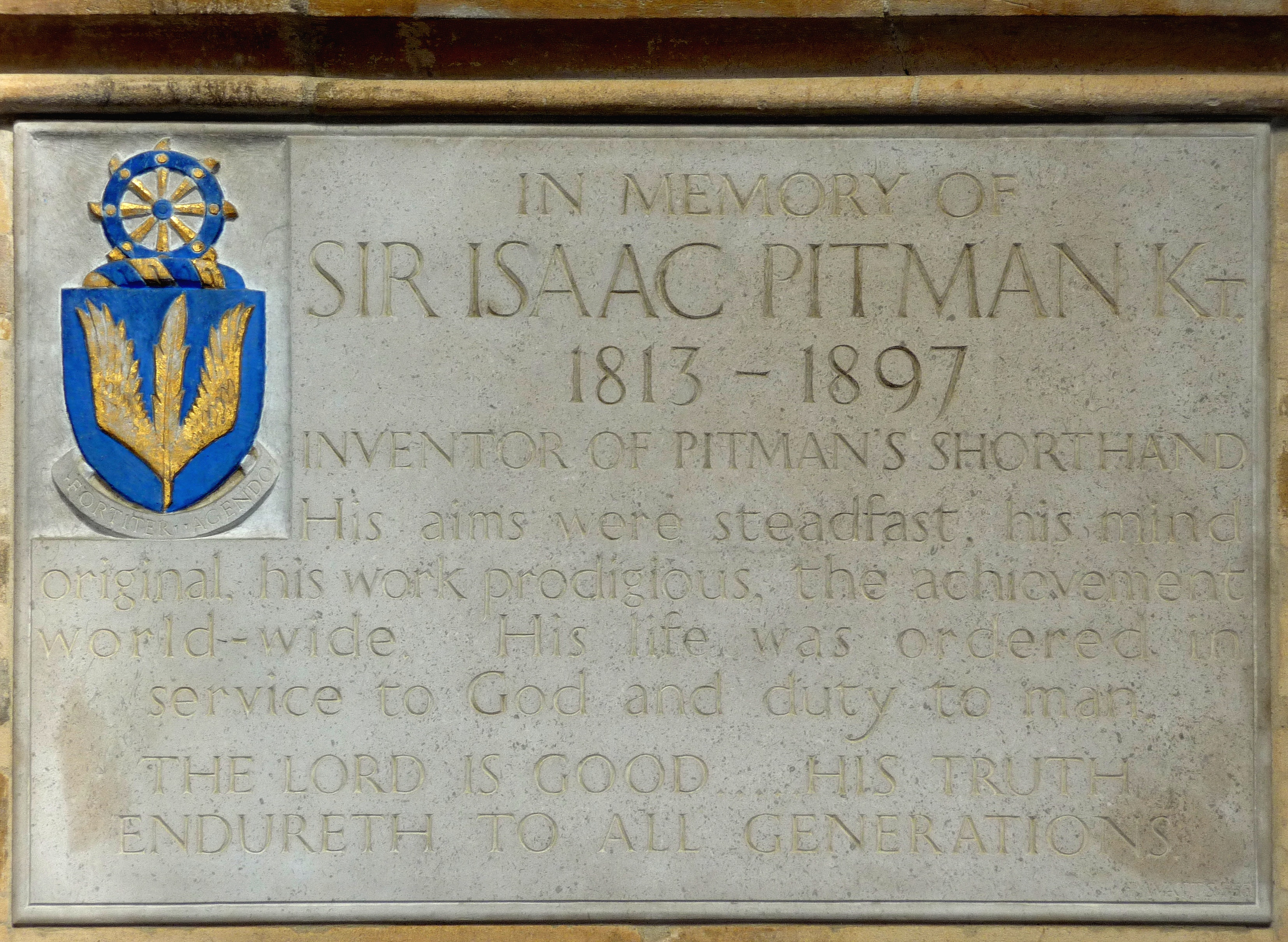
Memorial plaque of Isaac Pitman in Bath Abbey

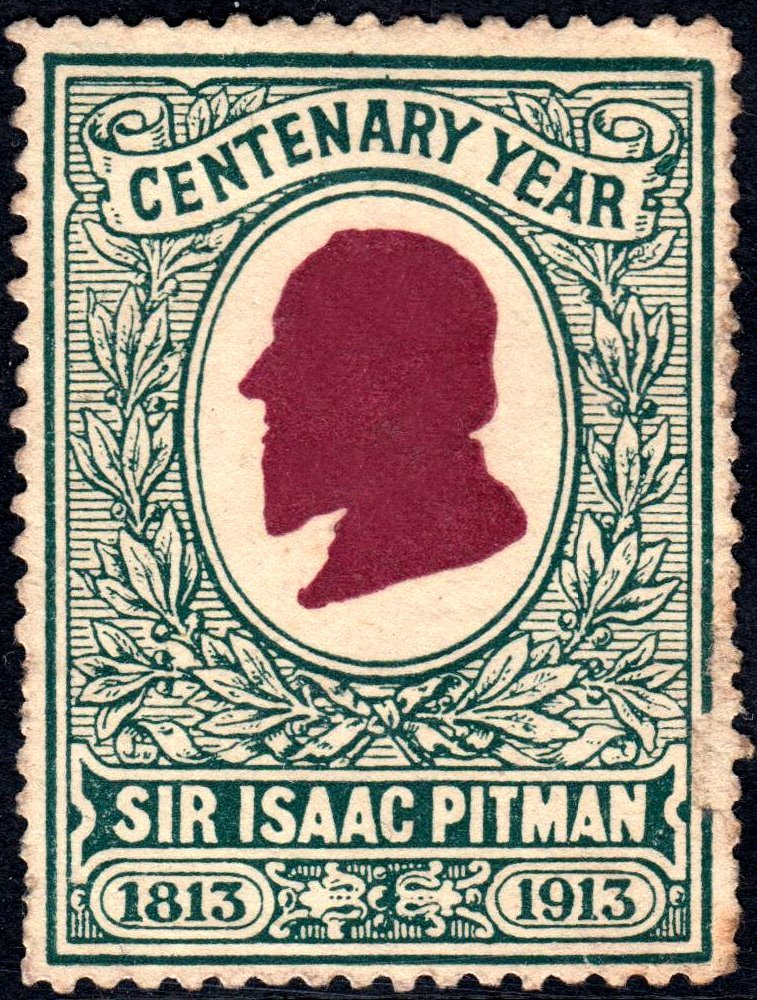
Stamp issued to mark the centenary of Pitman's birth.

Sir Isaac Pitman (4 January 1813 – 22 January 1897) was an English publisher and teacher of the English language who developed the most widely used system of shorthand, known now as Pitman shorthand. He first proposed this in Stenographic Soundhand in 1837. He was vice-president of the Vegetarian Society. Pitman was knighted by Queen Victoria in 1894.

== Background ==
Pitman was born in Trowbridge, Wiltshire in England. One of his cousins was Abraham Laverton. In 1831 he had five months' training at the Training College of the British and Foreign School Society, which was sufficient to qualify him as a teacher. He started teaching at Barton-upon-Humber, Lincolnshire. In 1835 he married a widow, and moved in 1836 to Wotton-under-Edge, Gloucestershire, where he started his own school. In 1839 he moved to Bath, where he opened a small school.

In the 1851 census he appears in Bath aged 38, living with his wife, Mary, aged 58, born in Newark-on-Trent, Nottinghamshire. He married Isabella Masters in 1861, and he appears in the 1871 census, aged 58, with his new wife Isabella, aged 46.

== Spelling reform and shorthand ==
Pitman was a lifelong advocate of spelling reform for the English language, producing many pamphlets during his lifetime on spelling reform. His motto was "time saved is life gained."

One of the outcomes of his interest in spelling reform was the creation of his system of phonetic shorthand which he first published in 1837, in a pamphlet titled Sound-Hand. Among the examples in this pamphlet, were Psalm 100, the Lord's Prayer, and Emanuel Swedenborg's Rules of Life. By 1843, his business of preparing and publishing had expanded sufficiently for him to give up teaching and to set up his own printing press, as well as compositing and binding. In 1844, he published Phonotypy, his major work on spelling reform. In 1845 he published the first version of the English Phonotypic Alphabet.

In the 1881 census, his name was spelled phonetically as Eisak Pitman. In the 1891 census he was again listed as Isaac, but his birthplace was changed to Bath.

== Printer and publisher ==
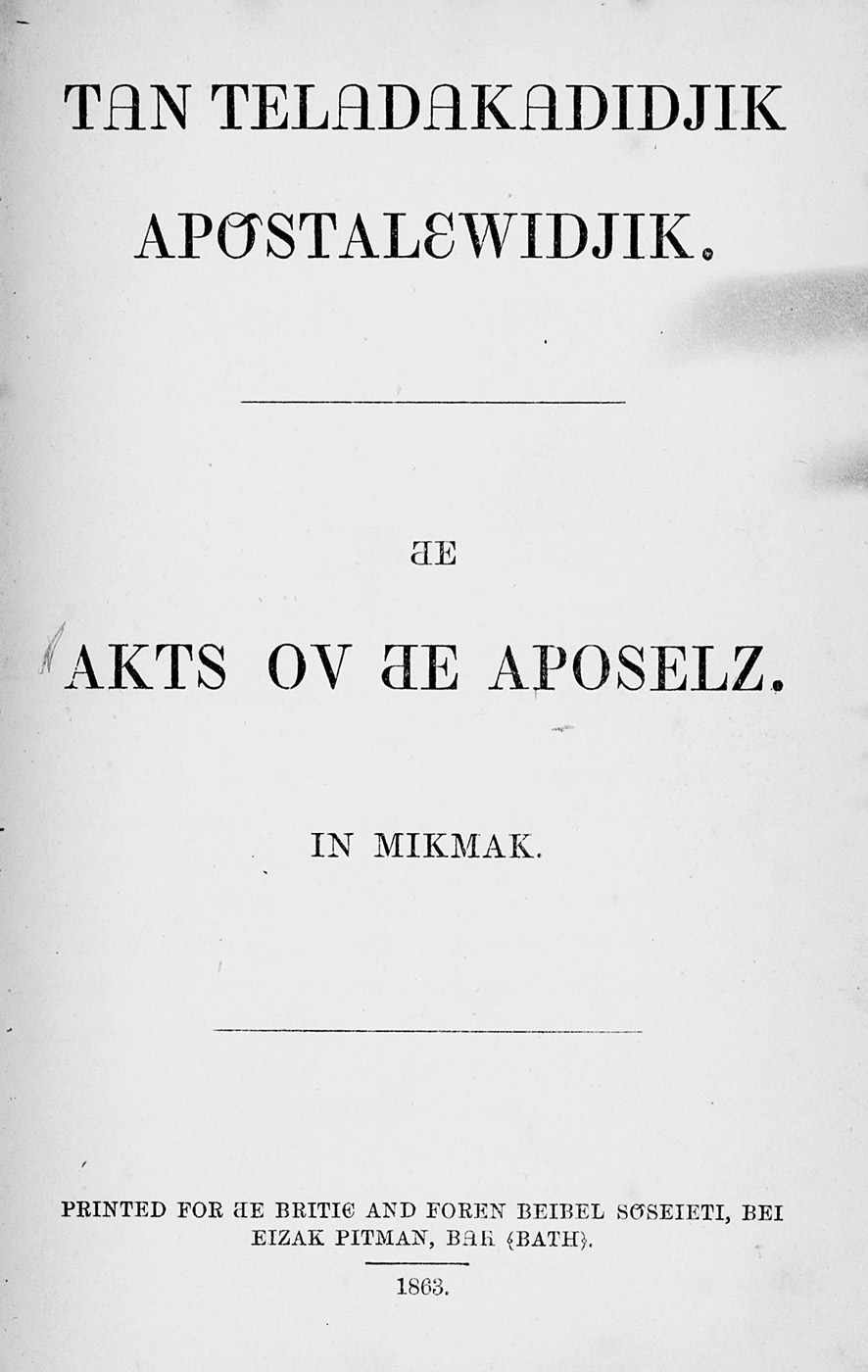
The Bible in the Miꞌkmaq language, printed by Pitman in 1863

In the 1860s, Pitman printed books for the British and Foreign Bible Society.

In 1886, he went into partnership with his sons Alfred and Ernest to form Isaac Pitman and Sons, later Sir Isaac Pitman and Sons.

In the same year the millionth copy of the Phonographic Teacher was sold in Great Britain. Isaac Pitman and Sons was to become one of the world's leading educational publishers and training businesses with offices in London, Bath, New York City, Melbourne, Johannesburg, Toronto and Tokyo. The publishing division, Pitman Ltd, was bought by rival Pearson Plc in 1985. The training business evolved into two separate businesses: Pitman Training and JHP Training (now learndirect).

== Distance learning ==
The first distance education course in the modern sense was provided by Sir Isaac Pitman in the 1840s, who taught a system of shorthand by mailing texts transcribed into shorthand on postcards and receiving transcriptions from his students in return for correction. The element of student feedback was a crucial innovation of Pitman's system. This scheme was made possible by the introduction of uniform postage rates across Britain in 1840.

== Personal life ==
Isaac Pitman was fervently Swedenborgian. Not only did he read The Writings of Emanuel Swedenborg daily, he also devoted much time and energy to educating the world about them. He published and distributed books and tracts by and about Swedenborg. Among the authors he encouraged was Thomas Child.

Pitman was active in the local New Church congregation in Bath while living on Royal Crescent. He was one of the founding members, when this congregation was formed in 1841. He served as president of this society from 1887 to his death in 1897. His contribution to this church was honoured by the congregation with a stained glass window depicting the golden cherub in the temple of wisdom described in Swedenborg's True Christian Religion No. 508. The window was dedicated on 5 September 1909.

His memorial plaque on the north wall of Bath Abbey reads, "His aims were steadfast, his mind original, his work prodigious, the achievement world-wide. His life was ordered in service to God and duty to man."

Pitman was the grandfather of James Pitman, who developed the Initial Teaching Alphabet. His grand-daughter, Honor Isabel Salmon (b.1912, née Pitman) was killed while piloting an Airspeed Oxford for the Air Transport Auxiliary in 1943.

His great-grandson John Hugh Pitman was appointed an OBE in 2010 for services to vocational training.

== Vegetarianism ==
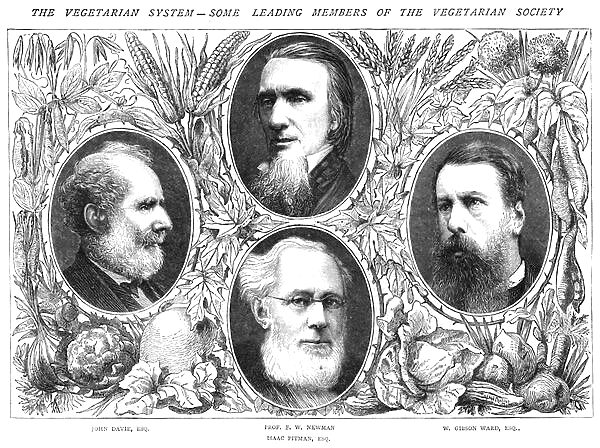
Pitman (bottom-centre) pictured along with other leading members of the Vegetarian Society, John Davie (left; 1800–1891), Francis William Newman (top-centre; 1805–1897), William Gibson Ward (right; 1819–1882)

In 1837, at the age of 34, Pitman discontinued the use of all alcoholic beverages and became a vegetarian, both lifelong practices. He also did not smoke.

Pitman advocated a simple vegetarian diet. He was Vice-President of the Vegetarian Society. In an 1879 letter to The Times (London), he attributed his excellent health and his ability to work long hours to his vegetarian diet and abstinence from alcohol. He commented that "I attribute my health and power of endurance to abstinence from flesh meat and alcoholic drinks. I can come to no other conclusion when I see the effect of such extended hours of labour on other men who eat meat and drink wine or beer". His brother Benjamin noted that Pitman "became a vegetarian, not for religious, but humanitarian and physiological reasons."

The Pitman Vegetarian Hotel was named after Pitman.

== See also ==
- Jacob Pitman (1810–1890) a settler in South Australia, founded a Swedenborg Church there, and taught Pitman shorthand in New South Wales. Mentions Uncle William (1801–1859), who also emigrated to South Australia with his large family.
