= Archibald Elliot =

Scottish architect (1761-1823)

- Born: August 1761; Scotland
- Died: 16 June 1823 (aged 61); Edinburgh, Scotland
- Occupation: Architect
- Buildings: Stobo Castle

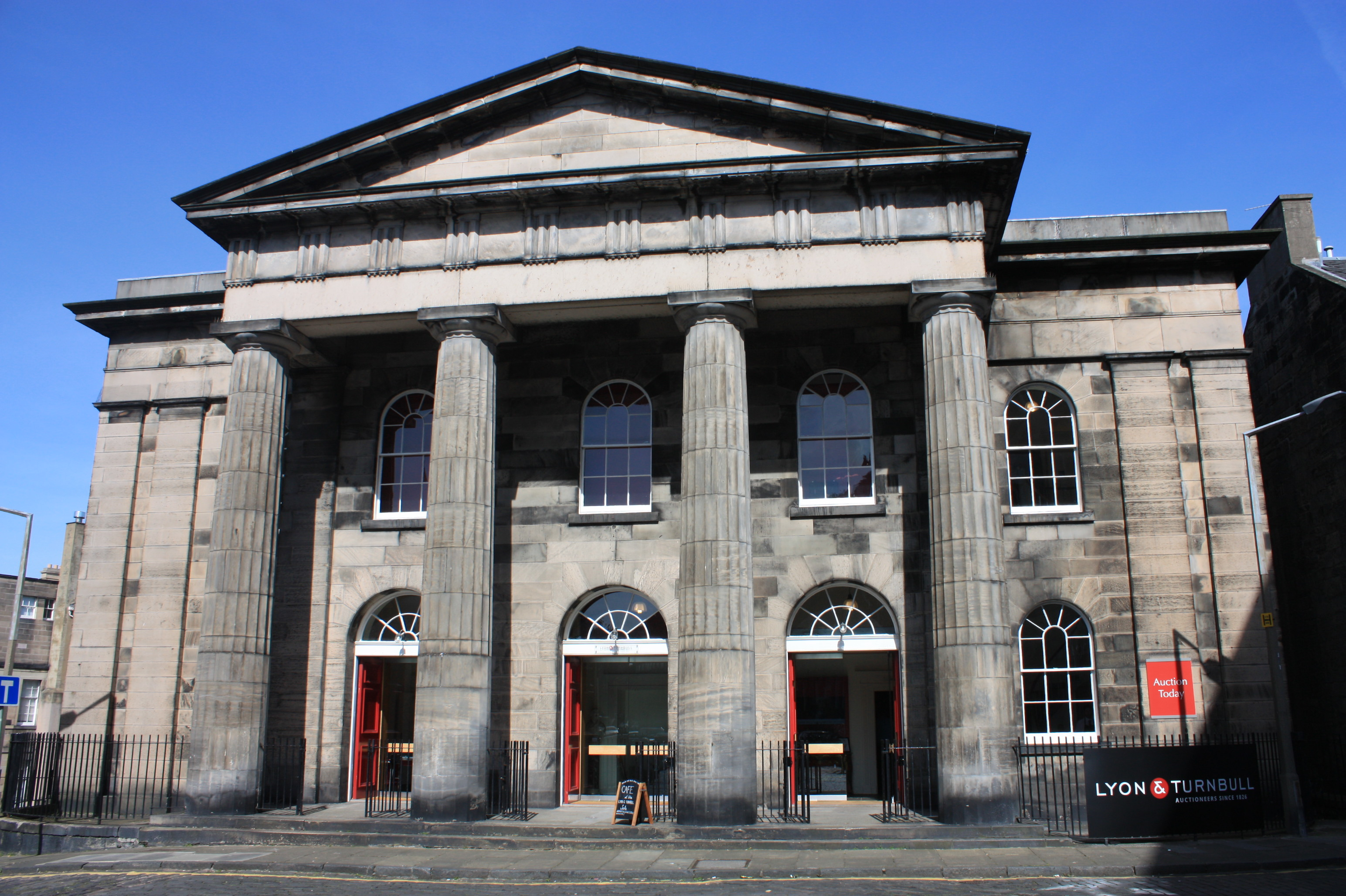
Broughton McDonald Church in Edinburgh

Archibald Elliot (August 1761 – 16 June 1823) was a Scottish architect based in Edinburgh. He had a very distinctive style, typified by square plans, concealed roofs, crenellated walls and square corner towers. All may be said to derive from the earlier local example of Melville Castle by James Playfair. Many of his works have been demolished.

== Life ==
He was born in Ancrum, Roxburghshire the son of a carrier. After training as a joiner he moved to cabinet design, working then in London, and appears to have then trained as an architect before returning to Scotland to work in Edinburgh.

Archibald Elliot ran an architecture practice in London and Edinburgh with his brother James Elliot. Following James's death in 1810, Archibald ran the company on his own. It was later taken over by Archibald's son, Archibald Elliot Junior.

He contributed to many significant buildings and streets in Edinburgh, including St Paul's and St George's Church, Rutland Square, the Regent Bridge, Waterloo Place and Calton Prison (now demolished). He was also involved with work on many country houses in Scotland, including Blair Castle and Taymouth Castle in Perthshire, Loudoun Castle in Ayrshire, and Stobo Castle in Peeblesshire.

He is buried near the centre of New Calton Cemetery, close to his works on Waterloo Place. A son, William Elliot (1796–1828) lies with him.

His younger brother, James Elliot (1770–1810), worked with him from 1800 until his early death.

Archibald's sons, Archibald Elliot (died 1843) and Alexander Elliot, ran a practice in London. Archibald inherited his father's practice on his death.

== Main works ==
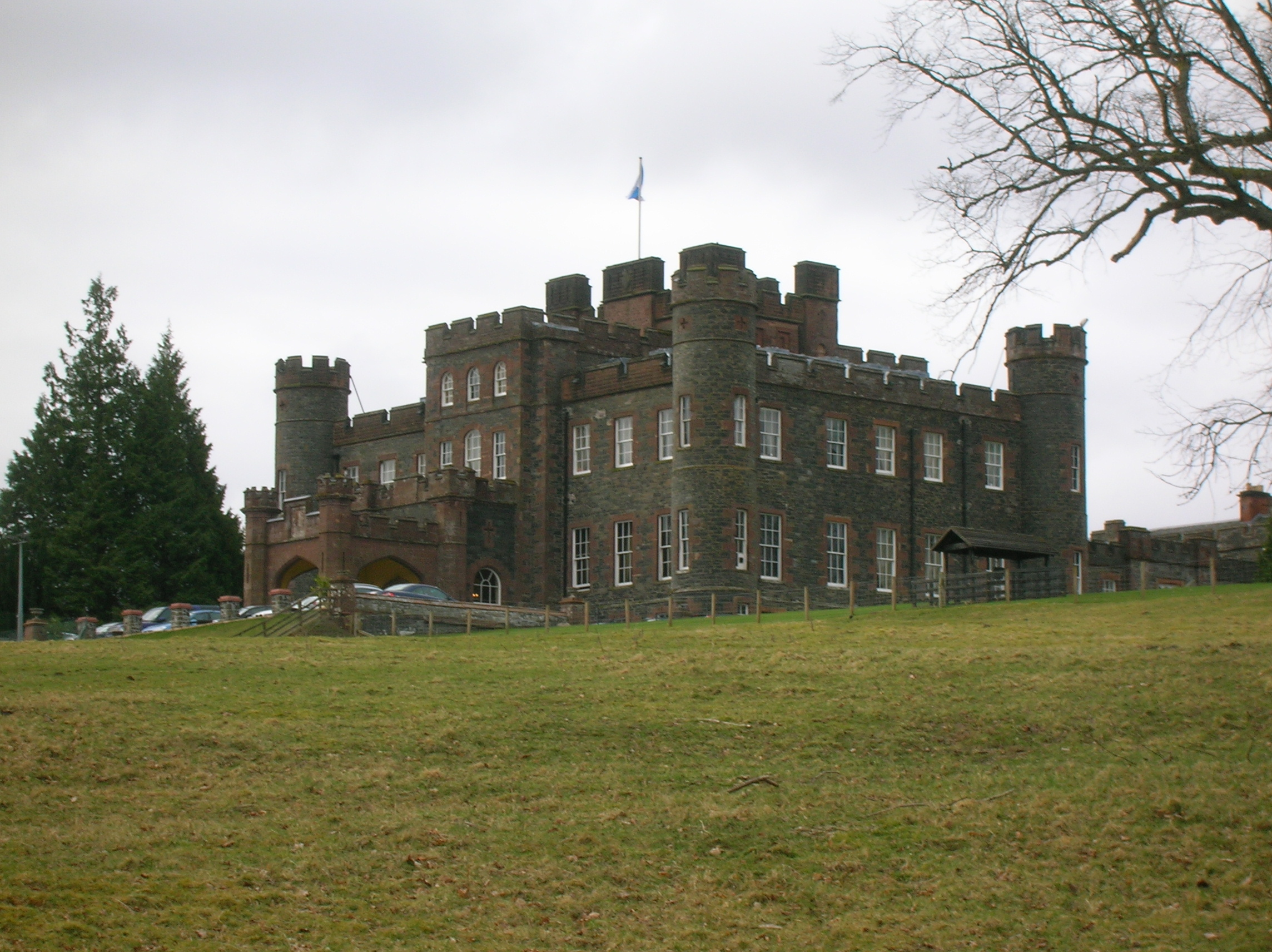
Stobo Castle

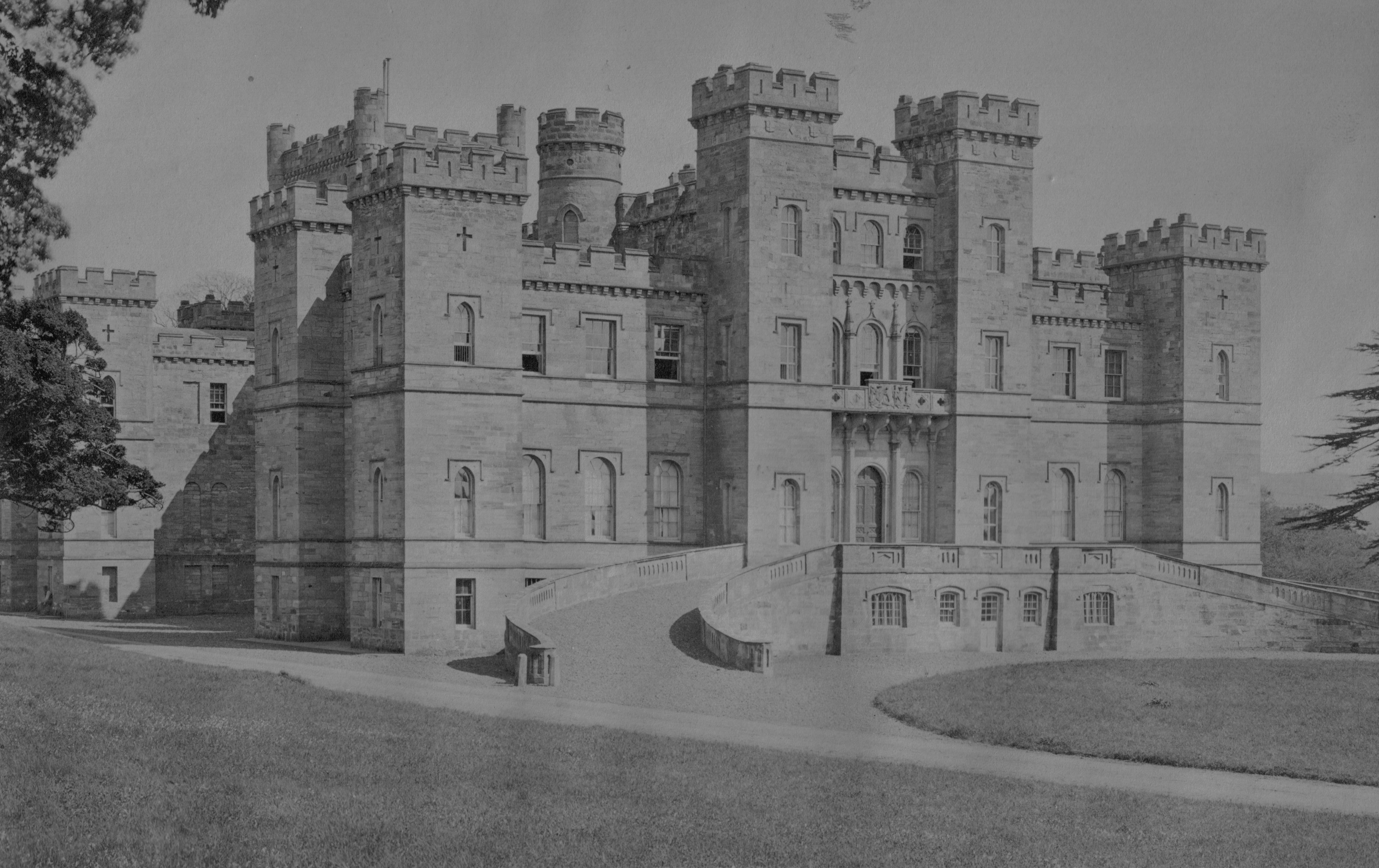
Entrance front of Loudoun Castle in the 1890s

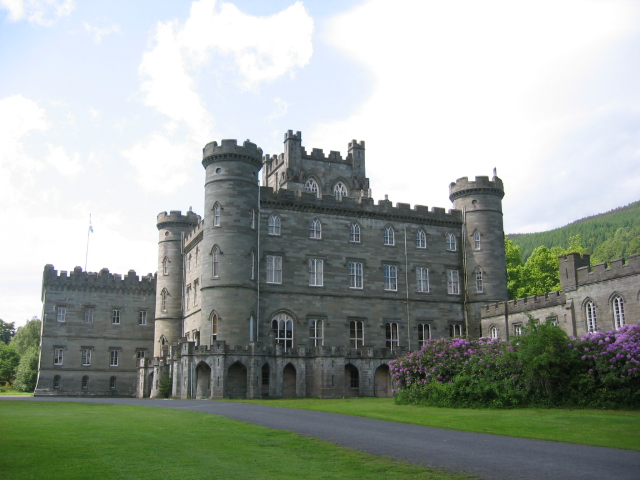
Taymouth Castle's eastern façade

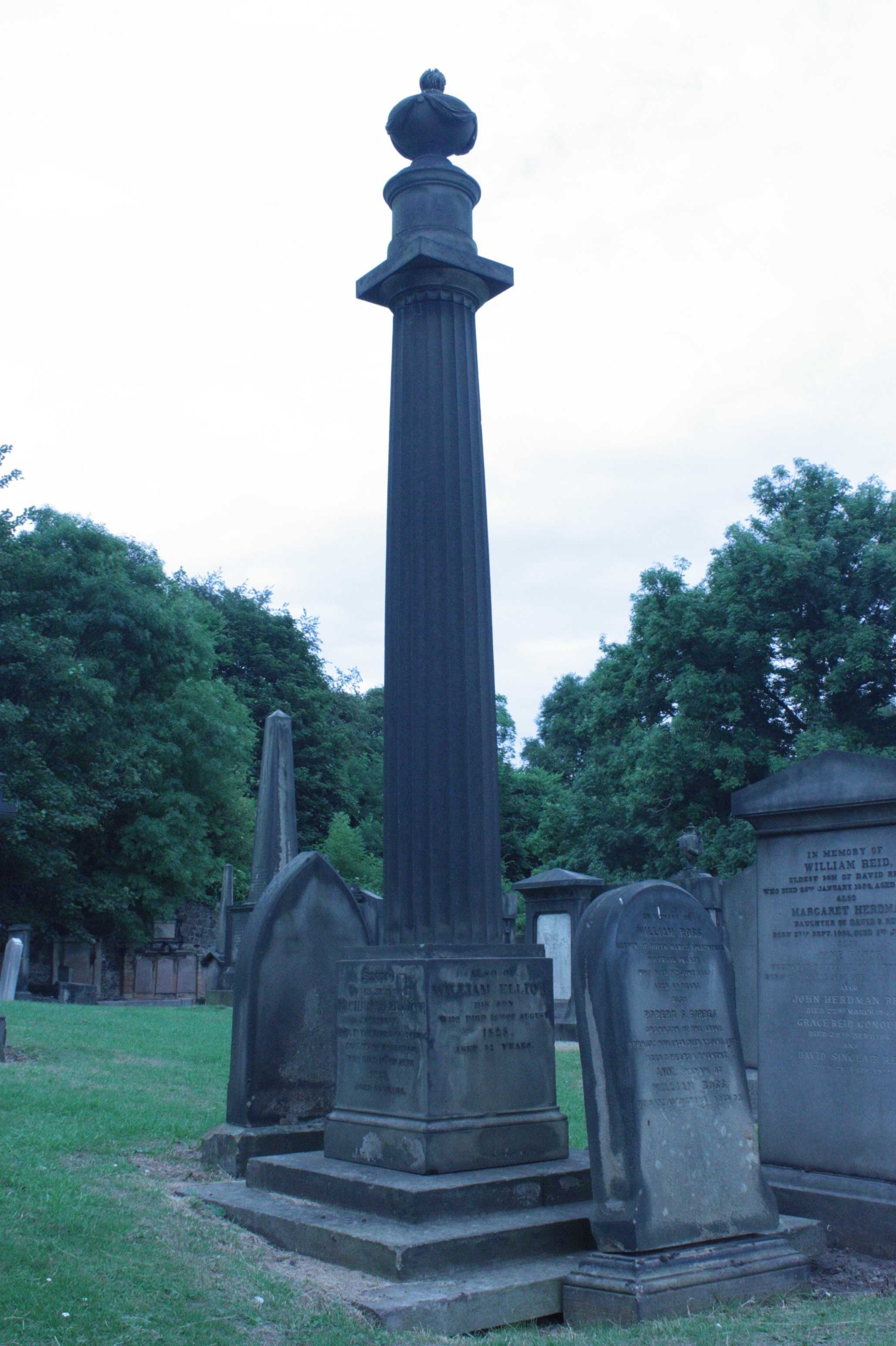
The grave of Archibald Elliot in New Calton Cemetery

- Loudoun Castle complete rebuilding around an original 17th-century tower house (1804) (largely demolished)
- Stobo Castle (1805)
- Taymouth Castle (1806)
- Guildhall, Dunfermline (1807)
- Old Kirk of Kirkcaldy (1807-1808)
- Redesign of Adam's General Register House (1813) to add a basement level
- Calton Prison (1815) (demolished 1930)
- Midlothian County Hall, Edinburgh (1816) (demolished)
- Waterloo Monument, Peniel Heugh (1817)
- St Paul's Chapel, York Place, Edinburgh (1818)
- 35 St Andrew Square, Edinburgh (as Royal Bank of Scotland head office) (1819)
- Rutland Square and Rutland Street, Edinburgh (1819–21)
- St George's Church, Paisley co-designed with William Reid (1819)
- Broughton McDonald Church, Broughton Place, Edinburgh (1820)
- Edmonstone House, south of Edinburgh (1821, now largely demolished)
- Blair Atholl Church (1823)
- Jedburgh Castle Jail (1823)
- St Mark's Episcopal Church, Portobello (1823) completed posthumously by his son (1825-7)
