= Francis William Newman =

English scholar and writer (1805–1897)

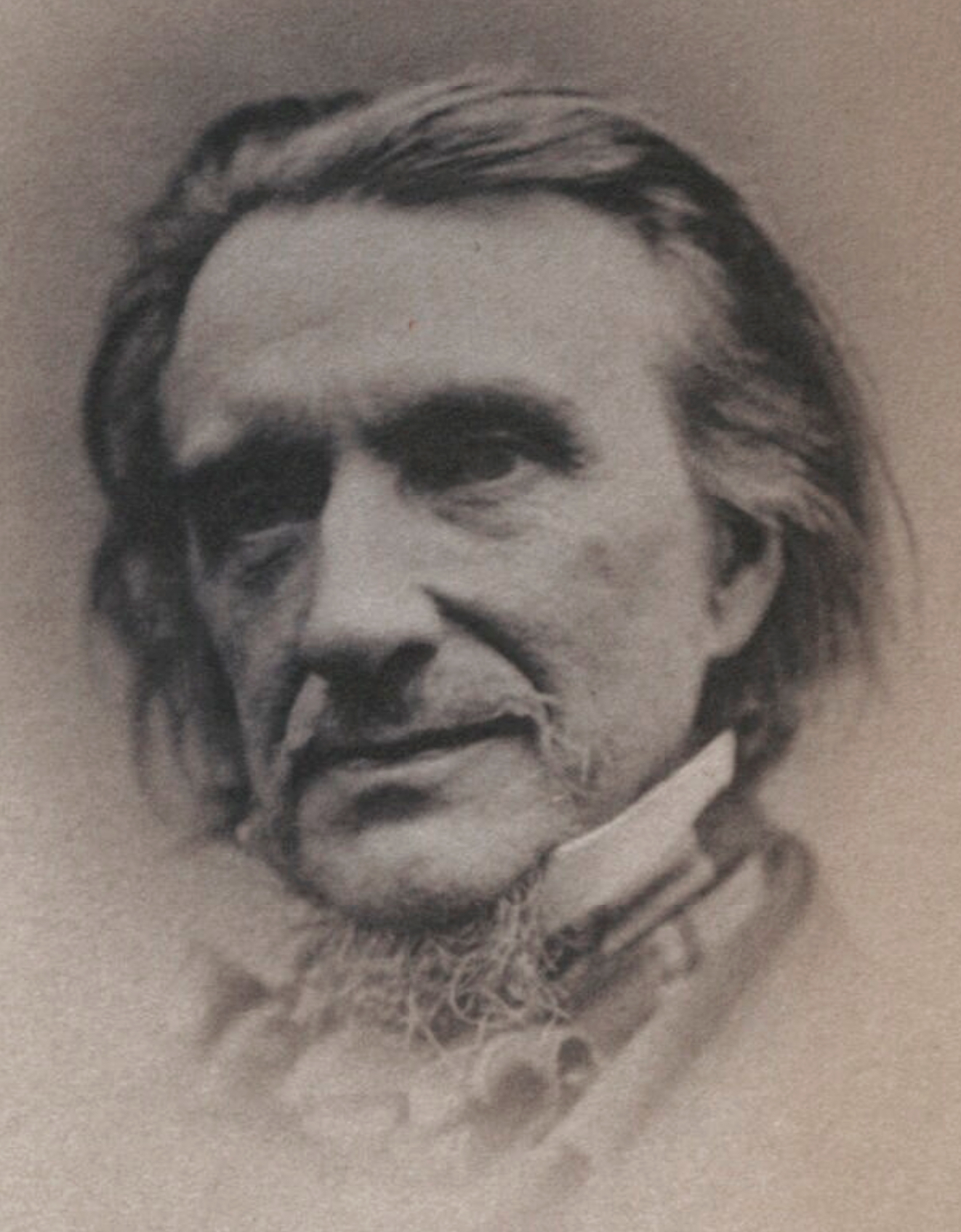
- Francis William Newman by J. Banks
- Born: 27 June 1805; London, England
- Died: 4 October 1897 (aged 92); Weston-Super-Mare, England
- Occupations: Scholar, philosopher, writer, activist
- Spouses: Maria Kennaway (m. 1835; died 1876) Eleanor Williams (m. 1878)
- Family: John Henry Newman (brother)

Francis William Newman (27 June 1805 – 4 October 1897) was an English classical scholar and moral philosopher, prolific miscellaneous writer and activist for vegetarianism and other causes.

He was the younger brother of John Henry Newman. Thomas Carlyle in his life of John Sterling called him a "man of fine attainments, of the sharpest-cutting and most restlessly advancing intellect and of the mildest pious enthusiasm." George Eliot called him "our blessed St. Francis" and his soul "a blessed yea".

== Early life ==
Newman was born in London, the third son of John Newman, a banker, and his wife Jemima Fourdrinier, sister of Henry Fourdrinier. With his brother John Henry, he was educated at Ealing School. He matriculated at Worcester College, Oxford in 1822, where he obtained a double first class and graduated B.A. in 1826. He was elected fellow of Balliol College in the same year.

During his undergraduate days, his father's bank having failed, he was able to complete his degree by relying on financial support from his older brother John Henry. Early in his student period, however, lodging as he did with his brother, he disagreed enough on established religion to feel, at least as he expressed it in a late autobiographical work, that there was a breach in their relationship. He never graduated M.A., normally at Oxford a pure formality, since he shortly acquired religious scruples about signing as required the 39 Articles.

In 1827, Newman went to Delgany, County Wicklow, where for a year he tutored the sons of Edward Pennefather, There he fell under the influence of Pennefather's brother-in-law, the Rev John Nelson Darby, one of the nascent group of Plymouth Brethren, who he describes in Phases of Faith as "the Irish Clergyman".

Conscientious scruples respecting the ceremony of infant baptism then led him to resign his fellowship in 1830.

== Missionary ==
Newman then took another position, in the family of Henry Parnell, 4th Baronet Parnell. An obituary of Edward Cronin, a Catholic convert widowed in 1829, suggests a Bible study group as origin of the sequel. Newman had recently been rejected by Maria Rosina Giberne, whom he had been courting for seven years, and had been helping his brother with parish work at Littlemore.

Shortly, in September 1830, Newman left Ireland with a party bound for Baghdad. They intended to join the independent faith mission of Anthony Norris Groves, who was working there with John Kitto and Karl Gottlieb Pfander. The party included John Vesey Parnell, who was its financial backer with John Gifford Bellett, Edward Cronin, and others. The journey, guided by the early views of Darby, ended badly. Newman's letters written home during the period of his mission were collected and published in 1856. There are other accounts, by the Brethren historian William Blair Neatby, and by Henry Groves, son of Anthony Norris Groves.

In 1833, Newman returned to England, via Tehran, with Kitto, arriving in June. He intended to find additional support for the mission: but rumours of unsoundness in his views on the doctrine of eternal punishment had preceded him.

== Academic ==
Finding himself looked upon with suspicion by erstwhile evangelical colleagues, including Darby, Newman gave up on his vocation of missionary. He became classical tutor at the non-sectarian Bristol College, which existed 1831–1841 at Park Row, Bristol.

In 1840 he became classics professor at Manchester New College, the dissenters' college lately returned from York, at the time linked to London University. In 1846 he moved to become a professor of Latin at University College, London, where he remained until 1869.

In 1856 Newman produced a translation of the Iliad which was heavily criticised by the poet and literary critic Matthew Arnold, which led to a bitter quarrel between the two in 1860 and resulted in Arnold's series of essays on translation, On Translating Homer.

== Views ==
Newman once described himself as "anti-everything". Wilfrid Meynell commented that Newman was as a "deist, vegetarian, anti-vaccinationist, to whom a monastery is even as a madhouse." Literary critic Lionel Trilling described Newman as a "militant vegetarian, an intransigent anti-vivisectionist, an enthusiastic anti-vaccinationist."

"The perfection of the soul, he said, lay in its becoming woman. He believed in woman's right to vote, to educate herself and to ride astride". He sought to make life rational in all things, including clothing. He wore an alpaca tailcoat in summer, three coats in winter (the outer one green), and in bad weather, he wore a rug with a hole cut for his head. When it was muddy, he wore trousers edged with six inches of leather.

=== Christian and secularist belief ===
As a young man, Newman was a fervent evangelical, associating with Walter Mayers and Thomas Byrth. At Oxford he was acquainted with radical Calvinist evangelicals, such as the circle around John Hill (1786–1855) of St Edmund Hall. In 1827 he encountered Benjamin Wills Newton of Exeter College, a future Plymouth Brethren founder, and Joseph Charles Philpot of his own college, who was his predecessor in the Pennefeather household in Dublin, much impressed by Darby.

Newman returned from Baghdad in 1833 a deist. He remained throughout life a believer in a theism, which has been described as "versatile". He had a believer's baptism in 1836 at Broadmead Chapel. He often attended both Unitarian and Baptist religious services, but was agnostic on many aspects of Christian doctrine.

In London of the 1840s Newman associated with the radical group comprising also William Henry Ashurst, William James Linton, William Shaen, James Stansfeld, Peter Alfred Taylor, mixing Unitarians and freethinkers. Harriet Martineau wrote to William Johnson Fox in 1849 about the "religious state of the world", saying "I am in the midst of the F Newman set of friends", mentioning also Bonamy Price's praise for Newman.

The liberal theological movement to which Newman belonged was hailed by George Jacob Holyoake, founder of British secularism. It equally received heavy criticism. The Anglican Clerical Journal, edited by Henry Burgess, wrote in 1854 of the "openly destructive volumes" of Newman and Theodore Parker. In that year, Newman published Catholic Union: Essays Towards a Church of the Future, as the Organization of Philanthropy.

=== Journalism and controversy ===
Newman wrote, anonymously, a favorable review of Vestiges of the Natural History of Creation for the first issue in 1845 of the Prospective Review, a journal edited by James Martineau, John Hamilton Thom and two other Unitarian ministers in the north of England. The content is considered to reflect the influence on Newman at this time of Baden Powell, in the area of science and religion.

With Martineau and others such as James Anthony Froude and Edward Lombe, he was one of the unorthodox but "respectable" backers when John Chapman took over the radical Westminster Review in 1851. The embattled Newman was a figure of controversy, particularly with Henry Rogers and his The Eclipse of Faith, or, A Visit to a Religious Sceptic of 1852, to which Newman replied. He was supported in the Westminster Review by a sympathetic article of 1858, "F. W. Newman and his Evangelical Critics", by Wathen Mark Wilks Call, that classed him as an "honest doubter". Considering the reception of ten books by Newman from the 1850s, Call (writing anonymously) concluded that many of his opponents "failed in candour, courtesy, generosity, and conscientiousness."

Newman himself published in the Westminster Review the provocative "Religious Weaknesses of Protestantism" in 1859. Circulation dropped, but Edward Henry Stanley stepped up with financial support. One of those offended was Henry Bristow Wilson, who thought it anti-Christian. He was one of the seven authors of Essays and Reviews (1860), which argued for a different version of liberal theology; among the other authors, Baden Powell was clearly influenced by Newman's views, while there is evidence that Mark Pattison took Phases of Faith to heart.

Returning to the topic at book length, Newman published The Religious Weakness of Protestantism in 1866. He was slow to drop the sola scriptura doctrine of Darby. Over time he developed arguments against it, under the headings of Bibliolatry and bigotry.

He went on to contribute 11 articles in the early 1870s to Fraser's Magazine, edited by Froude.

=== Social purity movement ===
Newman was both a supporter of a radical individualism and opponent of a centralised state; and an ethicist who opposed free love, and was concerned with urban libertinism and prostitution. In 1869 he became involved in the opposition to the Contagious Diseases Acts. In 1873 he stood his ground, while chairing a meeting against the Acts in Weston-super-Mare, confronting disruptive protesters.

In his lectures of the 1850s on political economy, Newman had commented on the "population doctrine" of Thomas Malthus. While he did not contest it in the abstract, in his view, the practical applications of the doctrine had been "deplorably and perniciously false."

An opponent of birth control, Newman put a case that sexual excess was a danger to women's health. The Moral Reform Union, launched in 1881 and commended by The Englishwoman's Review, published Newman's book 1889 book The Corruption Now Called Neo-Malthusianism.

=== Vegetarianism ===
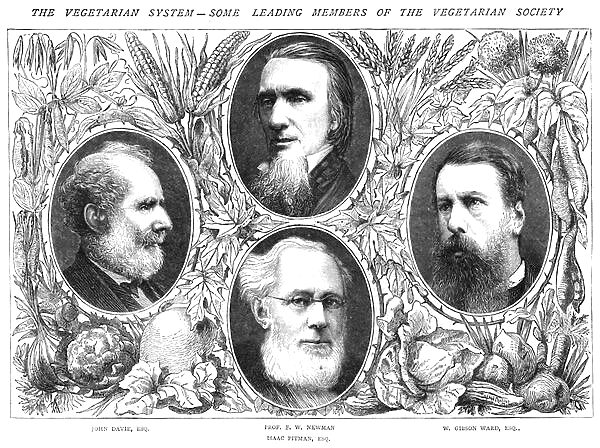
Newman (top-centre) pictured along with other leading members of the Vegetarian Society, John Davie (left; 1800–1891), Isaac Pitman (bottom-centre; 1813–1897), William Gibson Ward (right; 1819–1882)

Newman joined the Vegetarian Society in 1868, and was President of the Society from 1873 to 1884. He was opposed to the dogmatic ideas of raw foodism and objected to the disuse of flavourings and salt. He commented that "the number of dogmatic prohibitions against everything that makes food palatable will soon ruin our society if not firmly resisted." In 1877, Newman criticized a raw food book of Gustav Schlickeysen.

He made an associate membership possible for people who were not completely vegetarian, such as those who ate chicken or fish. From 1875 to 1896, membership for the Vegetarian Society was 2,159 and associate membership 1,785.

Newman did not like the term "vegetarian" because it implied someone who ate only vegetables. Instead, he preferred the Greek term "anti-creophagite" or "anti-creophagist" (anti-flesh eater). This idea was not supported by other members of the Society, as few people knew what the term meant. He used the phrase "V E M" diet (vegetables, eggs, milk). Newman consumed dairy and eggs. In 1884, a hostile review of his book Essays on Diet commented that he "is no vegetarian himself in the strict acceptation of the word, for he takes milk, eggs, butter, and cheese." Newman believed that abstinence from meat, fish and fowl should be the only thing the Vegetarian Society advocates. Some members believed that Newman was not strict enough. However, under Newman's presidency the Society flourished as income, associates and membership numbers increased.

In the 1890s, Newman converted to a pescetarian diet, and consumed white fish.

=== Vaccination ===
Newman was an anti-vaccinationist and supported the Anti-Compulsory Vaccination League. He carried over arguments, against following the advice of a "medical clique", that he had used against the Contagious Diseases Acts. In 1869, an article in The Lancet journal criticized Newman for holding this opinion and tried to convince him to withdraw his support for the League.

One of Newman's opponents in the vaccination controversy was Henry Alleyne Nicholson (Harry), whom he had tutored, and the son of his good friend John Nicholson. He declined to answer Henry's pamphlet.

=== Land reform ===
- The Land as National Property: With Special View to the Scheme of Reclaiming it for the Nation Proposed by Alfred Russel Wallace (1886)

Newman was quoted by James Platt as stating that "the ownership of land is a monstrous despotism".

During the 1870s, Newman supported Matthew Vincent's scheme for acquiring land to provide smallholdings for agricultural labourers.

== Family ==
Newman was married twice, firstly on 23 December 1835 to Maria Kennaway (died 1876). She was the second daughter of Sir John Kennaway, 1st Baronet, and a Plymouth Sister. They had met at Escot House in 1834. Francis's mother Jemima was at the end of her life — she died in spring 1836 — but welcomed Maria to the Newman family home. John Henry Newman found that unacceptable. By 1840 the brothers were more reconciled, at least in correspondence.

Maria's sister Frances married Edward Cronin in 1838.

The couple had no children. Under the will of John Sterling (died 1844), Francis became guardian of his orphaned son Edward Conyngham Sterling. Edward (Teddy) went to live with the Newmans in Manchester; for a while his younger brother, John Barton Sterling was there also − their sisters went to their uncle Anthony Coningham Sterling. Edward Sterling was an artist, and married in 1868 Bertha Stone, a suffragist, daughter of Frank Stone. Born in 1831 on Munro Plantation, St Vincent, he died in 1877. He had a house built in Sheffield Terrace, London, in 1876, by Alfred Waterhouse.

Secondly, Newman married Eleanor Williams on 3 December 1878.

== Death ==
After his retirement from University College, Newman continued to live for some years in London, subsequently moving to Clifton, and eventually to Weston-super-Mare, where he died in 1897. He had been blind for five years before his death, but retained his faculties to the last.

Newman's funeral address was given by John Temperley Grey. It contained the comment that he was "a saint in the very thick of life's battle."

== Legacy ==
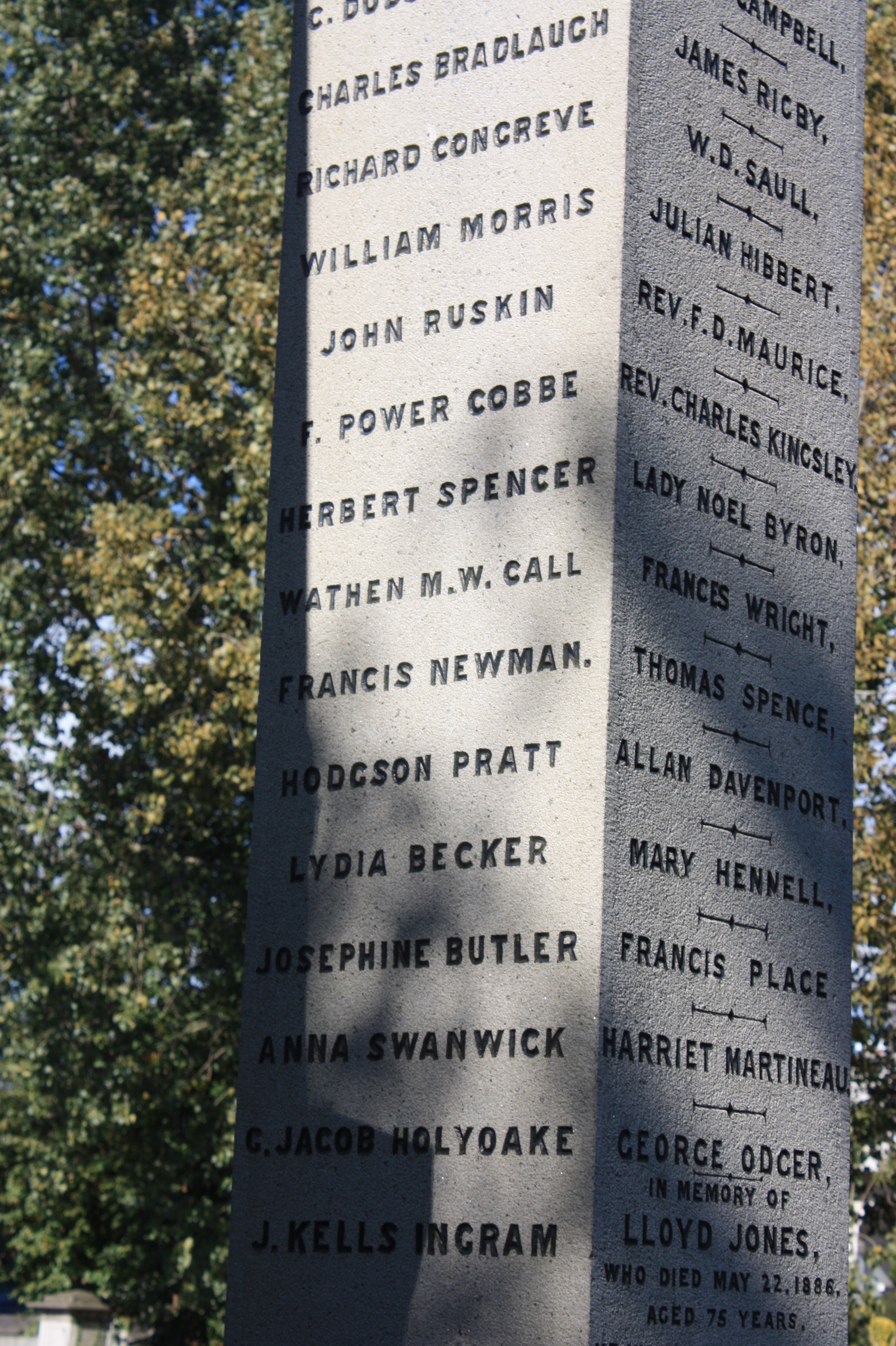
Newman's name on the lower section of The Reformers' Memorial, Kensal Green Cemetery

Newman is listed on the south face of The Reformers' Memorial in Kensal Green Cemetery in London.

Karl Marx quoted from Newman's "Lectures on Political Economy", given at Bedford College in Capital, Volume III, p. 595.

== Collections ==
University College London Special Collections holds a small archive of letters from Newman to James and Caroline Morris.

== Works ==
Newman studied mathematics and oriental languages, but wrote little until 1847. He is credited with the Weierstrass definition of the gamma function (1848, in reciprocal form).

=== Linguistic ===
As listed in the Dictionary of National Biography.

- A Collection of Poetry for ... Elocution, 1850
- Homeric Translation in Theory and Practice, 1861; a reply to Matthew Arnold.
- The Text of the Iguvine Inscriptions, 1864
- A Handbook of Modern Arabic, 1866
- Translations of English Poetry into Latin Verse, 1868
- Orthoëpy ... Mode of Accenting English, 1869
- Dictionary of Modern Arabic, 1871, 2 vols.
- Libyan Vocabulary, 1882
- Comments on the Text of Æschylus, 1884
- Supplement ... and Notes on Euripides, 1890
- Kabail Vocabulary, 1887

Translations or adaptations into Latin:

- Hiawatha [The Song of Hiawatha]. London: Walton and Maberly. 1862.
- Rebilius Cruso [Robinson Crusoe]. London: Trübner & co. 1864. (In the preface Newman describes himself as "taking only the general idea from Defoe".)

=== Religion ===
Prominent were:

- History of the Hebrew Monarchy (1847; 1853); intended to introduce the results of German scholarship and Biblical criticism.
- The Soul (1849; 3rd edit. 1852) This work made a favourable impression on Charlotte Brontë.
- Phases of Faith (1850; 1852), autobiographical, detailing the author's passage from Calvinism to theism.
- Theism, Doctrinal and Practical, 1858

Others listed in the Dictionary of National Biography:

- On the Relation of Free Churches to Moral Sentiment, 1847
- Thoughts on a Free and Comprehensive Christianity, Ramsgate [1865]
- The Religious Weakness of Protestantism, Ramsgate, 1866
- On the Defective Morality of the New Testament, Ramsgate, 1867.
- The Bigot and the Sceptic, Ramsgate [1869]
- James and Paul, Ramsgate, 1869
- Anthropomorphism, Ramsgate, 1870
- On the Causes of Atheism [1871]
- The Divergence of Calvinism from Pauline Doctrine, Ramsgate, 1871
- The Temptation of Jesus, Ramsgate [1871]
- On the Relation of Theism to Pantheism, and on the Galla Religion, Ramsgate, 1872
- Thoughts on the Existence of Evil, Ramsgate [1872]
- On the Historical Depravation of Christianity, 1873
- Ancient Sacrifice, 1874
- Hebrew Theism, 1874
- The Two Theisms [1874]
- On this and the other World [1875]
- Religion not History, 1877
- Morning Prayers, 1878; 1882
- What is Christianity without Christ? 1881
- A Christian Commonwealth, 1883
- Christianity in its Cradle, 1884; 1886
- Life after Death? 1886; 1887
- The New Crusades; or the Duty of the Church to the World, Nottingham, 1886
- Hebrew Jesus: His true Creed, Nottingham, 1895

Posthumous was

- Mature Thought on Christianity, 1897, edited by George Jacob Holyoake.

=== Social and political ===
As listed in the Dictionary of National Biography.

- A State Church not Defensible, 1845; 1848
- On Separating ... Church from State, 1846
- Appeal to the Middle Classes on ... Reforms, 1848
- On ... Our National Debt, 1849
- Lectures on Political Economy, 1851
- The Ethics of War, 1860
- English Institutions and their ... Reforms, 1865
- The Permissive Bill, Manchester, 1865
- The Cure of the great Social Evil, 1869; first part reprinted as On the State Provision for Vice, 1871; second part reprinted, 1889
- Europe of the near Future, 1871
- Lecture on Women's Suffrage, Bristol [1869]
- Essays on Diet, 1883
- The Land as National Property [1886]
- The Corruption now called Neo-Malthusianism, 1889; 1890
- The Vaccination Question, 5th edit. 1895

=== Other ===
- The Science of Evidence. Oxford: J. H. Parker. 1838.
- Personal Narrative in Letters, Principally from Turkey in the Years 1830–3. London: Hollyoak & co. 1856.
- Physiological Arguments in Favor of Vegetarianism. The Herald of Health, 1875.
- Contributions chiefly to the Early History of Cardinal Newman (1891), considered at the time deficient in fraternal feeling.
