= Pitman Training =

UK-based training company

Pitman Training Group
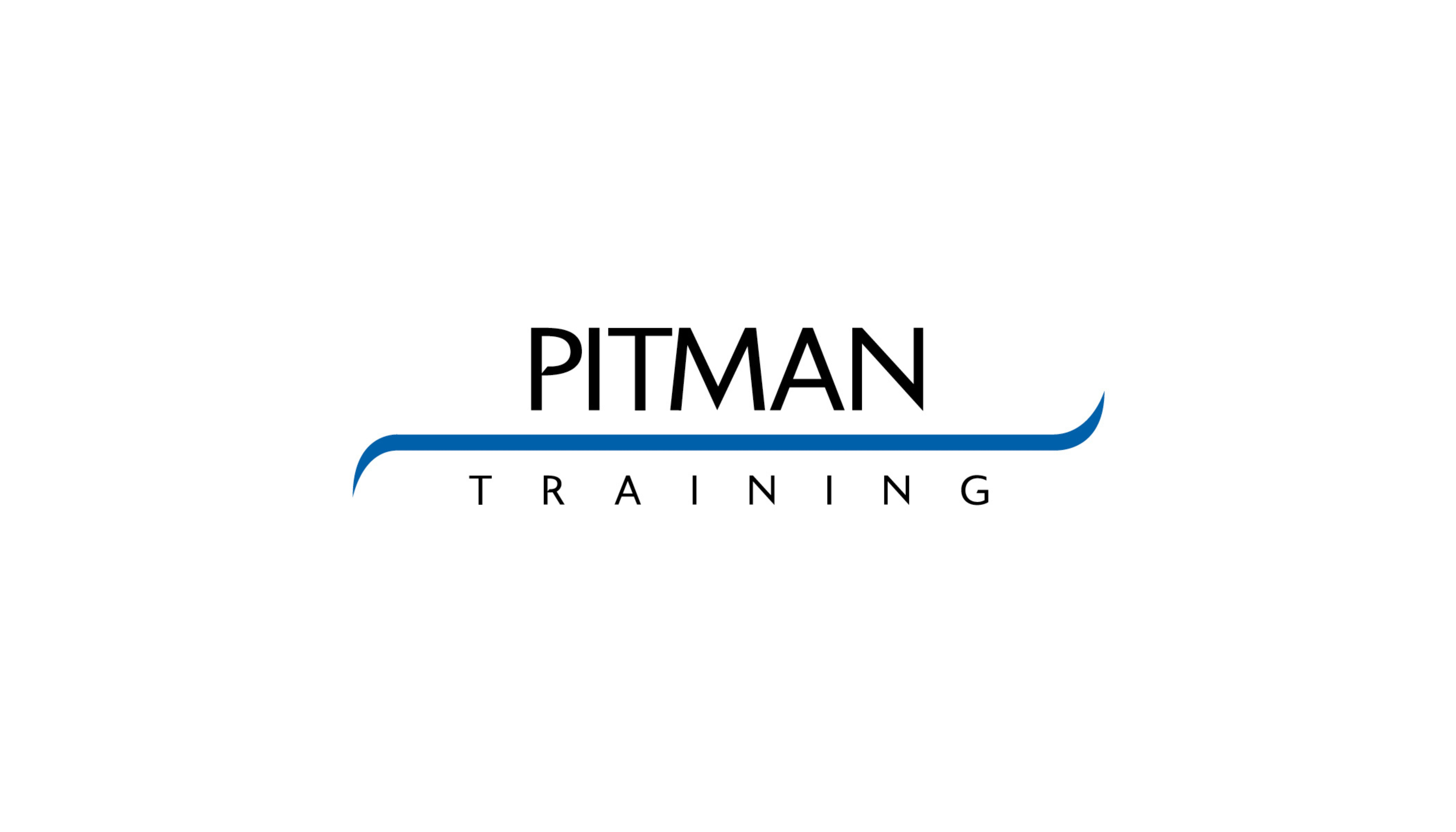
- Company type: Private
- Traded as: Pitman Training
- Industry: Training
- Founded: 1837
- Headquarters: Wetherby, West Yorkshire, England
- Area served: Global
- Parent: LaunchLife International Inc.
- Website: www.pitman-training.com

Pitman Training Group Limited is a private limited company based in Wetherby, West Yorkshire. They are an independent training provider, delivering online and paper-based tests for educational organisations. The company has been in operation since 1837 - when Issac Pitman invented Shorthand.

== History ==
Pitman Training is named after Isaac Pitman, the pioneer of shorthand writing. Along with his sons, Alfred and Ernest, Isaac developed training businesses across the UK. The training business later evolved into two separate companies: Pitman Training and JHP Training (now Learndirect Ltd).

Pitman Training claims to provide training to more than 30,000 people each year and currently holds a pass rate of 98 per cent for their Diploma range. A 2003 survey by the group found that 15 per cent of Britain's working population wanted a career change.

=== Expansion ===
There are 50 training centres across the UK and 17 in Ireland, as well as 6 international markets spread across 13 training centres in Palestine, Russia, Kuwait, Pakistan, Kenya and Ghana.

=== Partnerships and sponsorships ===
Pitman Training partners with a number of educational bodies, including the Association of Accounting Technicians, the British Computer Society, Digital Marketing Institute and City and Guilds.

The group has sponsored several awards and events, including the Yorkshire PA of the Year Awards and Bett Asia event in Kuala Lumpur, Malaysia.

== Awards ==
In October 2014, the group won best Low Budget Campaign of the Year at the Northern Marketing Awards. The winning campaign was ‘Career MOT – Drive Your Future Forward’; a campaign which used iOS, Android and web apps to engage prospects via a UK-wide roadshow.

In March 2015, Pitman won the award for In-House Team of the Year (North) at the PR Moment Awards.

In June 2015, Pitman Training was a finalist at the HSBC Franchisor of the Year awards, due to their accelerated global expansion. Later in the year, Fran Maclean of Pitman was a finalist in the Olderpreneur Franchisee of the Year award, supported by HSBC Franchisee of the Year.

In February 2017, Pitman was recognised in the Executive Education, Training and Development category of the 2017 Super Brands list.

The company runs its own annual Super Achievers Awards for its students. Awards include PA of the Year, Working Mum/Dad of the Year and Entrepreneur of the Year.
