= Old Kirk of Kirkcaldy =

Former Church of Scotland church in Kirkcadly, Fife

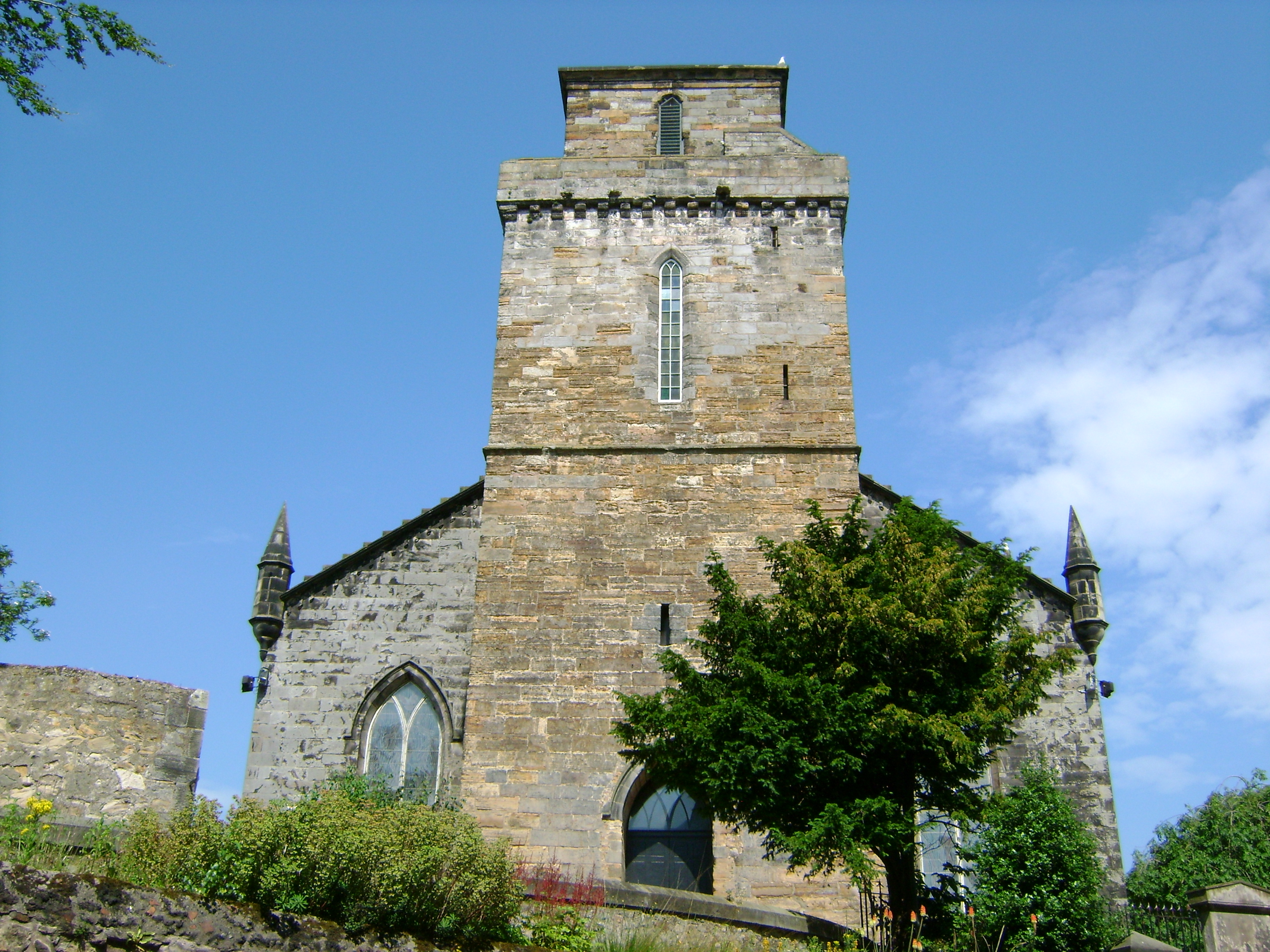
The square Norman tower of Old Kirk, Kirkcaldy

The Old Kirk of Kirkcaldy is a former parish church in Kirkcaldy, Fife, Scotland. The church's Norman tower is the oldest building in continuous use in the town.

In 2011, after the Church of Scotland finalised Presbytery Plans to sell off 400 churches across Scotland, it was acquired by the Kirkcaldy Old Kirk Trust, who are committed to preserving it for use as a community resource, concert space, heritage centre and for continuing worship.

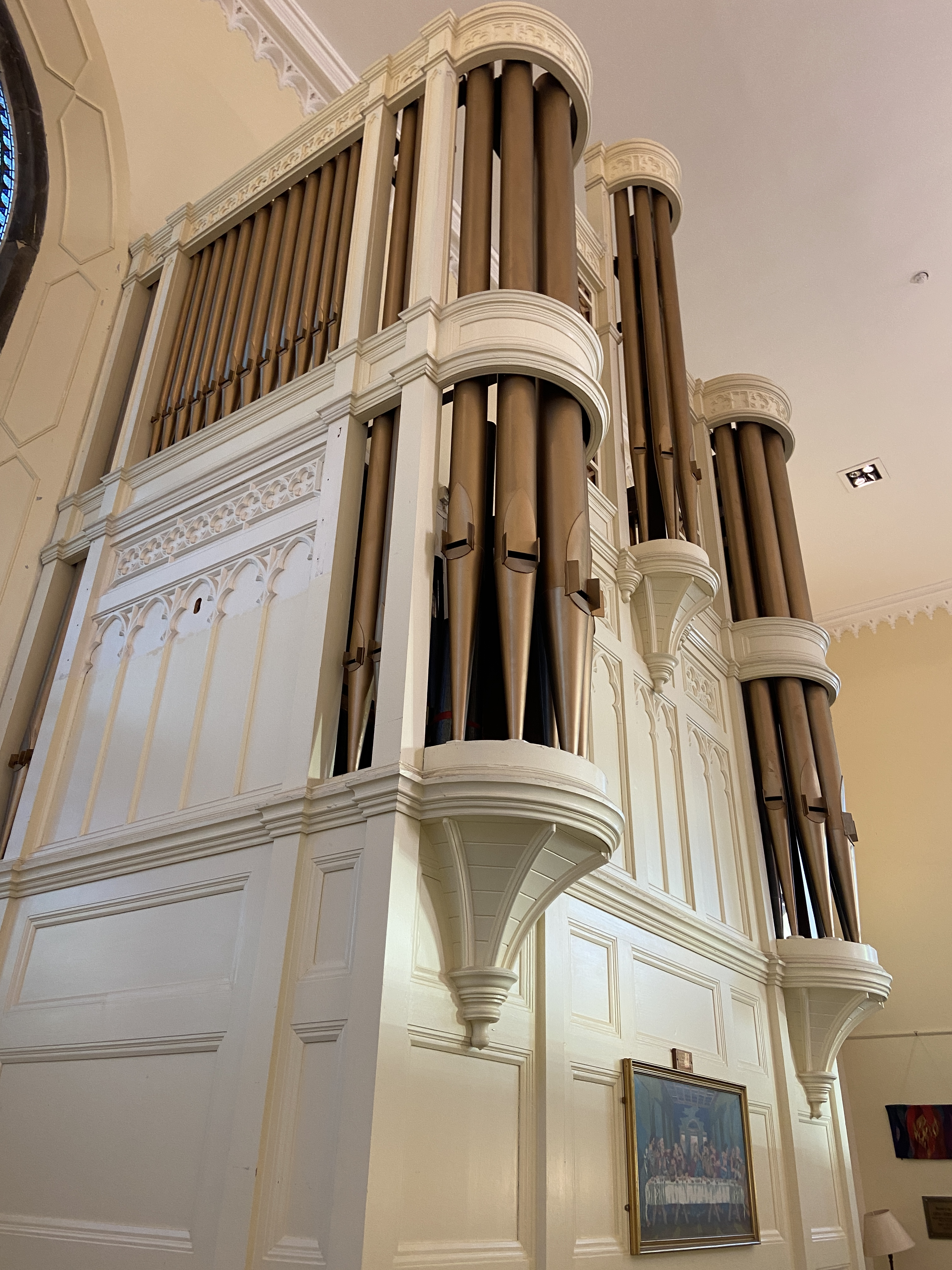
View of the August Gern organ

The kirk is open to the public for visits during the summer months, and regularly features live music, performances and events for the community. The kirk contains an organ installed in 1885 by August Gern, which is still in use for recitals. The kirk also features an interactive visual display, created by a team from St. Andrew's University School of Computer Science which shows the church building and town as they would have appeared in the 16th century.

== History ==
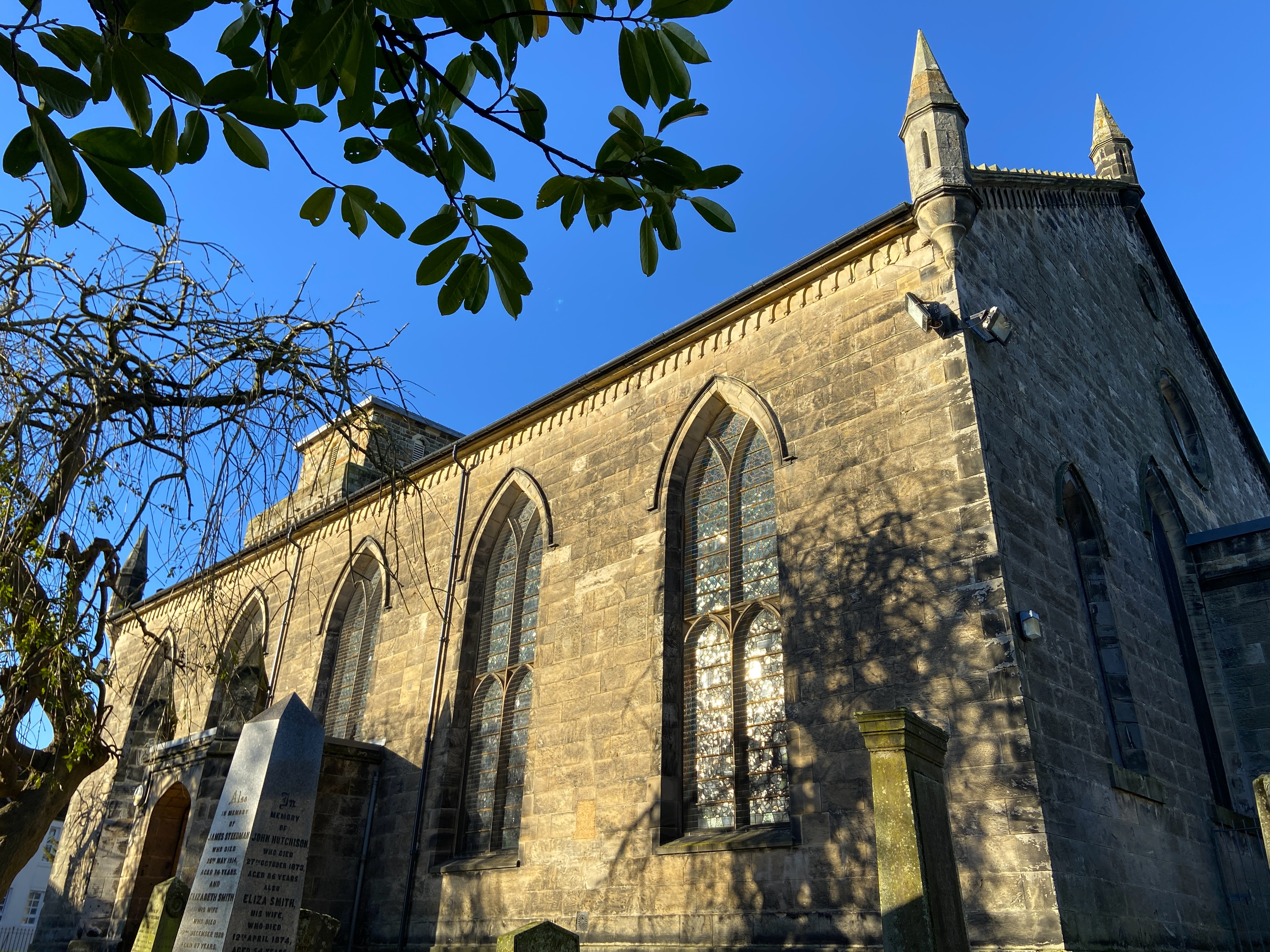
View of the Old Kirk building from the south

The kirk first appeared in written record in 1240 when it was consecrated to St. Patrick and St. Bryce by the Roman Catholic Bishop David de Bernham, Bishop of St. Andrews. It is thought to have been built on the site of a previous Celtic church, established by monks from St. Columba’s monastery on Iona in the 7th century. The presence of a stone cist in the graveyard and burial remains found nearby suggest that the site of the present church has been used as a burial place from at least the Early Medieval Era. There are no records for the earliest period of the church until after the Reformation in 1560, where it appears in Kirkcaldy town records, with the first Session records dating from 1614.

Records for the Kirkcaldy Kirk Sessions and accounts from 1663 to 1892 are available to view on Scotland's People.

== Description ==
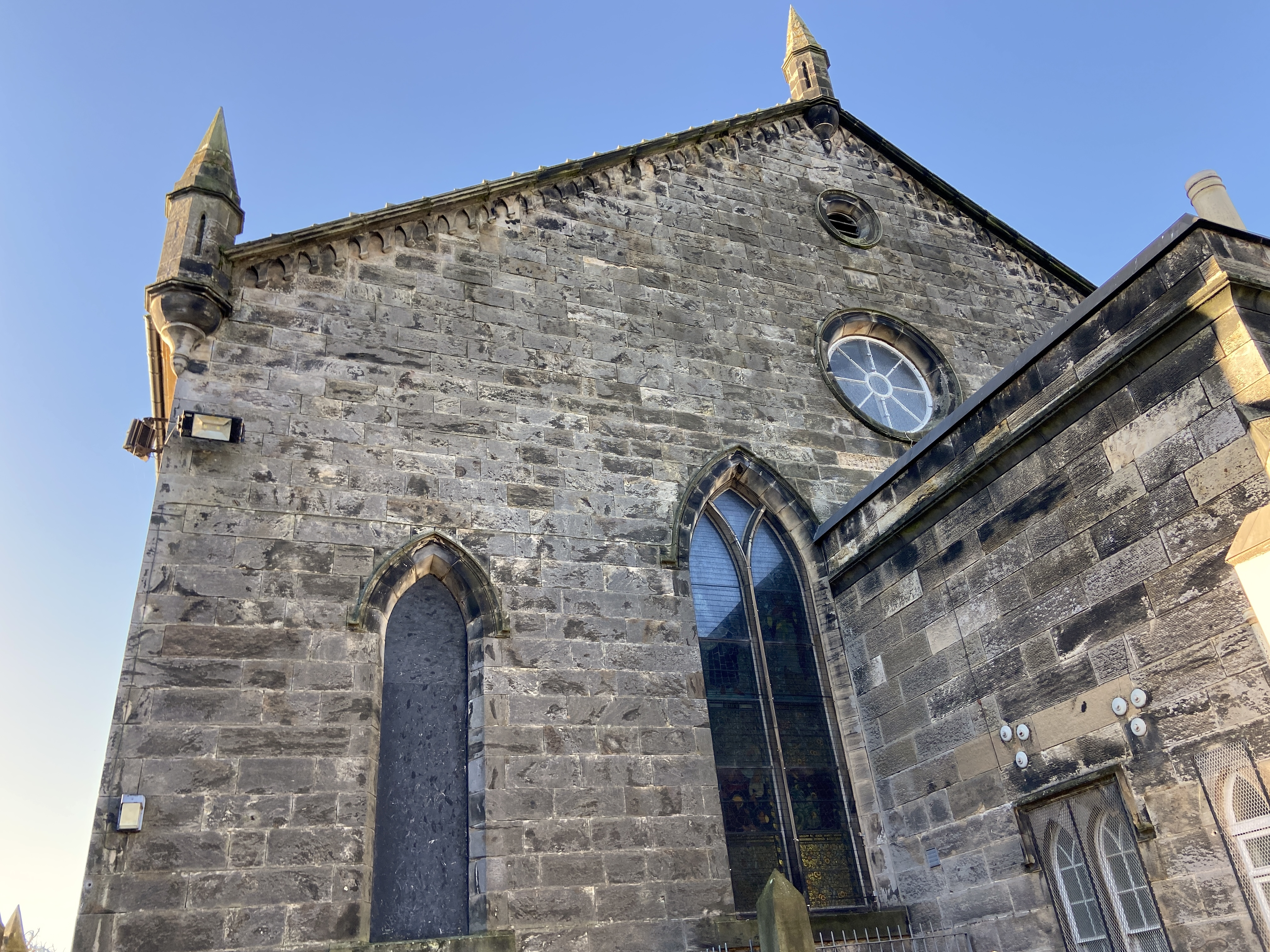
View of the north wall of the Old Kirk building

The kirk is situated on a hill overlooking the east of the town, not far from the harbour. The main building is a Victorian structure designed by Archibald Elliott, erected between 1807–1808 to replace an earlier structure that had become dilapidated. This part of the kirk contains a series of stained glass windows by Sir Edward Burne-Jones, from 1886, which were installed by William Morris, a set by the firm of Alexander Gascoigne of Nottingham, and more modern examples from John Clark in 1986 and in 1994, by Crear McCartney.

The kirk tower is of Norman design has been dated to the 16th century. It is constructed from ashlar sandstone and follows the model of a mediaeval Scottish tower house, rising to a height of 55 feet, with walls in places 5 feet thick. As well as its use as a bell tower, this part of the kirk was used as the Session house, and in the 18th century served as the town jail. It is also thought to have been used as a place of refuge for the town's population, evidenced by the presence of several narrow slit windows. The tower features an outside parapet reached via an internal staircase, which allows visitors an extensive view of the town of Kirkcaldy and the Firth of Forth.

== Gallery collapse ==
The lowest tender for the construction of the main building of the church in 1807 was submitted by the firm of Alexander McFarlane of Perth, whose bid of £3,000 was significantly lower than other tenderers. During the construction process it was established that supporting beams for the church galleries had not been properly fitted, and that the roof was inadequately slated. The firm was sued, resulting in bankruptcy, with local contractors required to complete the building. This is believed to have contributed to the collapse of the North Gallery on 15 June 1828, which resulted in the death of three people from the collapse, and 26 from the ensuing crush in their efforts to escape the church.

== Graveyard ==
The graveyard contains over 300 memorial stones dating back to 1522 and is the burial place of many of Kirkcaldy's eminent townsfolk, including 29 provosts. The kirk offers tours that illustrate the lives of many of the people in the burial ground. As with many burial grounds, many lairs have been reused, and documents in the possession of the Kirk detail names of individuals whose memorials have been lost, including some that were covered when the main church building was replaced in 1807–1808.

== Notable associations ==
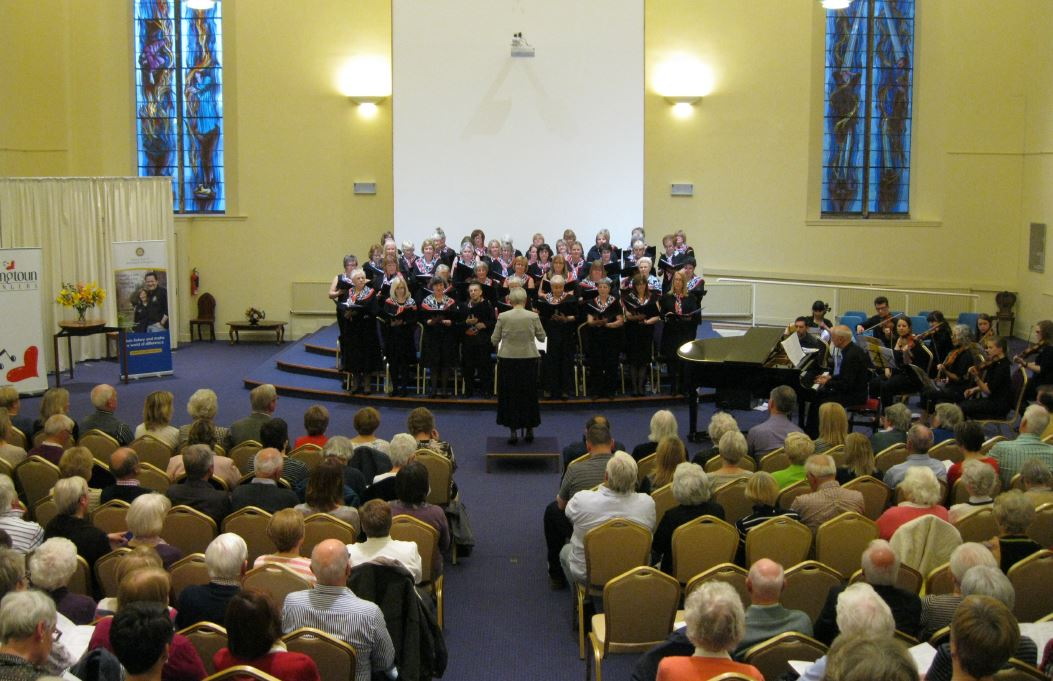
Musical performance at the Old Kirk

The Scottish economic and moral philosopher Adam Smith was baptised at Kirkcaldy Old Kirk in 1723. The Scottish theologian George Gillespie was born at the Old Kirk Manse, his father being minister at the kirk, and is buried beneath the Kirk building; his life is commemorated with a plaque in the kirk's interior.
