= 1847 =

1847 in various calendars
- Gregorian calendar: 1847; MDCCCXLVII
- Ab urbe condita: 2600
- Armenian calendar: 1296; ԹՎ ՌՄՂԶ
- Assyrian calendar: 6597
- Baháʼí calendar: 3–4
- Balinese saka calendar: 1768–1769
- Bengali calendar: 1253–1254
- Berber calendar: 2797
- British Regnal year: 10 Vict. 1 – 11 Vict. 1
- Buddhist calendar: 2391
- Burmese calendar: 1209
- Byzantine calendar: 7355–7356
- Chinese calendar: 丙午年 (Fire Horse); 4544 or 4337 — to — 丁未年 (Fire Goat); 4545 or 4338
- Coptic calendar: 1563–1564
- Discordian calendar: 3013
- Ethiopian calendar: 1839–1840
- Hebrew calendar: 5607–5608
- Hindu calendars
- Vikram Samvat: 1903–1904
- Shaka Samvat: 1768–1769
- Kali Yuga: 4947–4948
- Holocene calendar: 11847
- Igbo calendar: 847–848
- Iranian calendar: 1225–1226
- Islamic calendar: 1263–1264
- Japanese calendar: Kōka 4 (弘化４年)
- Javanese calendar: 1774–1775
- Julian calendar: Gregorian minus 12 days
- Korean calendar: 4180
- Minguo calendar: 65 before ROC 民前65年
- Nanakshahi calendar: 379
- Thai solar calendar: 2389–2390
- Tibetan calendar: མེ་ཕོ་རྟ་ལོ་ (male Fire-Horse); 1973 or 1592 or 820 — to — མེ་མོ་ལུག་ལོ་ (female Fire-Sheep); 1974 or 1593 or 821

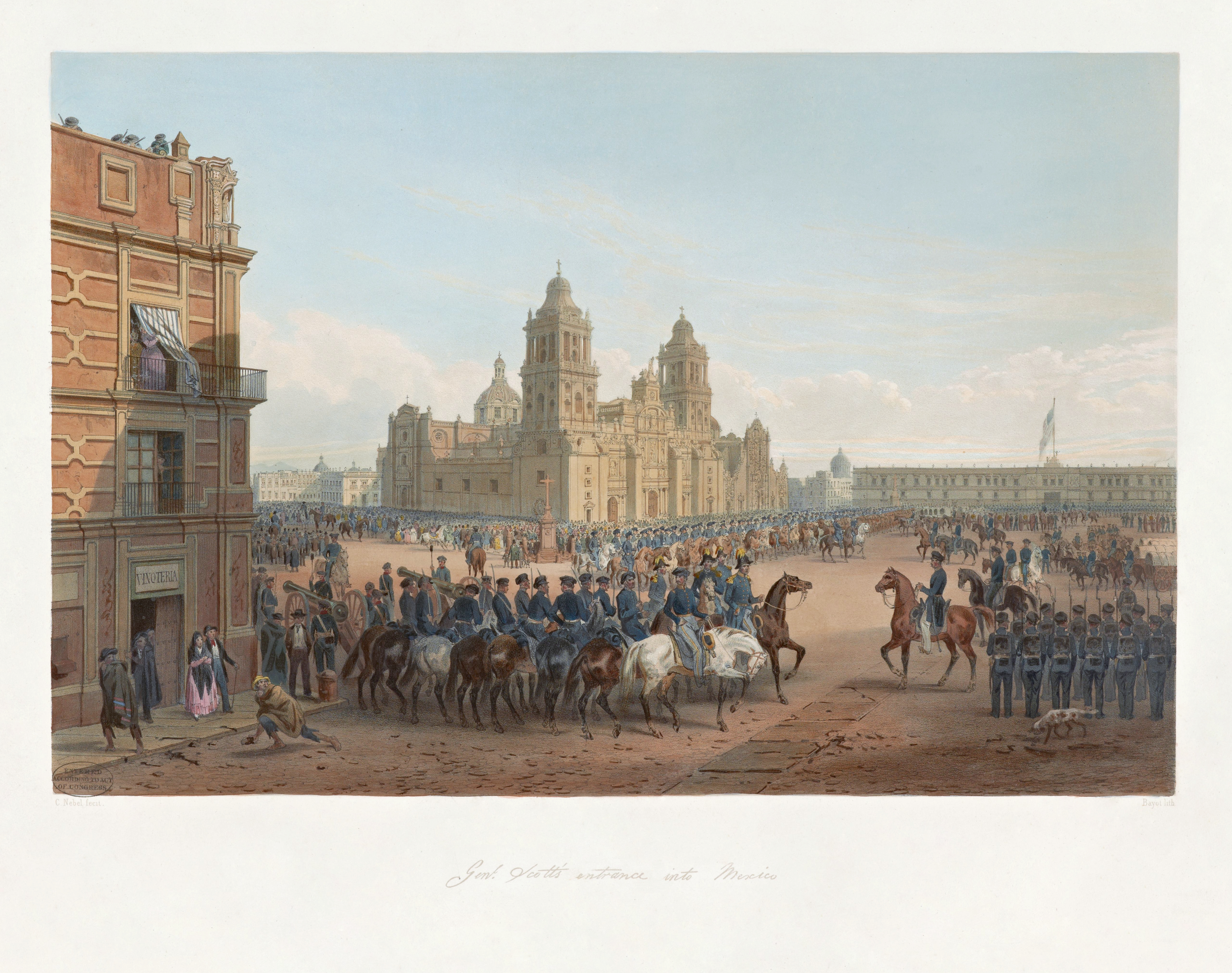
September 14: Mexico City, capital of Mexico, is captured by U.S. troops led by General Winfield Scott.

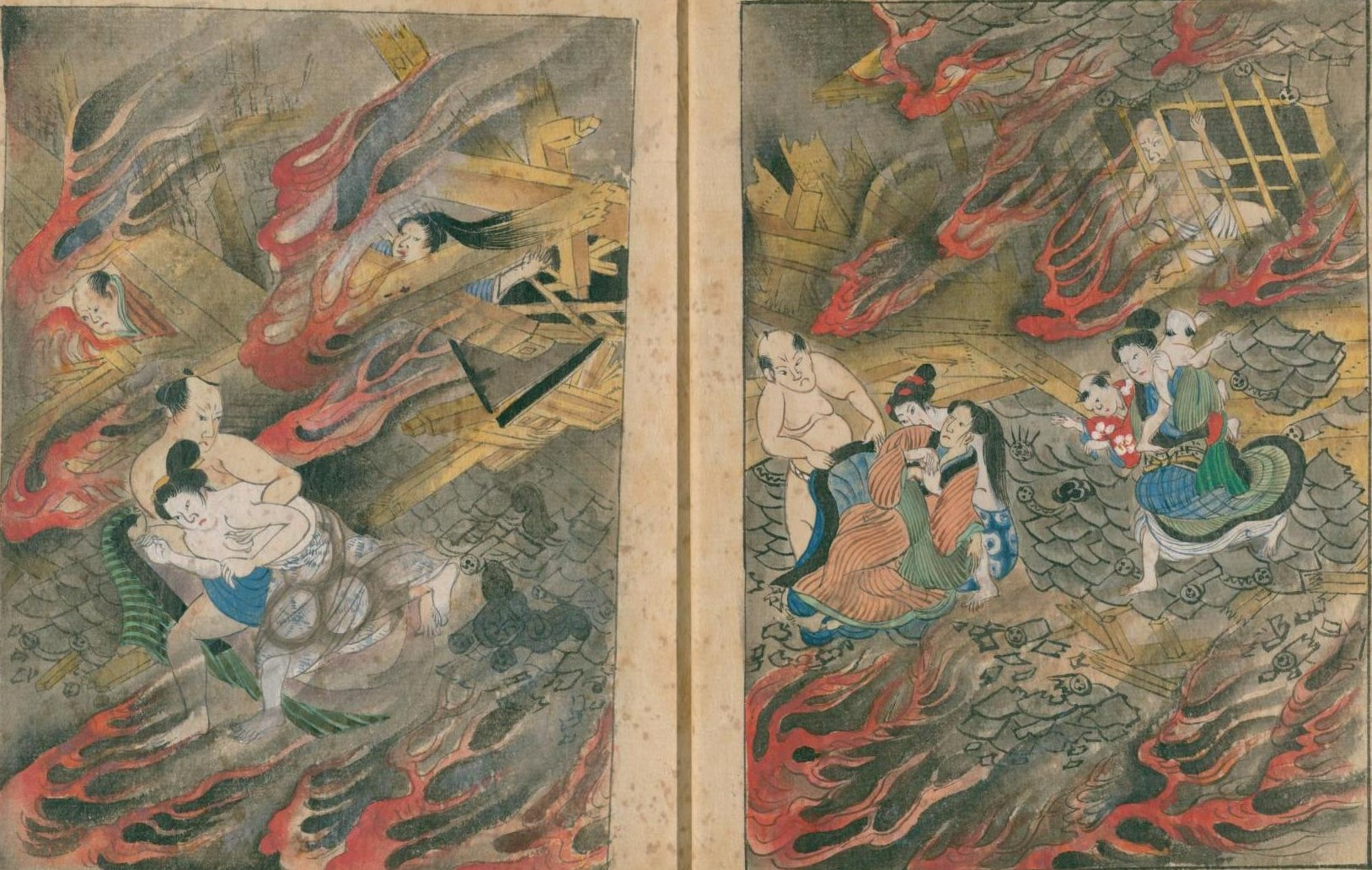
May 8: Earthquake in Japan kills 8,600 people.

1847 (MDCCCXLVII) was a common year starting on Friday of the Gregorian calendar and a common year starting on Wednesday of the Julian calendar, the 1847th year of the Common Era (CE) and Anno Domini (AD) designations, the 847th year of the 2nd millennium, the 47th year of the 19th century, and the 8th year of the 1840s decade. As of the start of 1847, the Gregorian calendar was 12 days ahead of the Julian calendar, which remained in localized use until 1923.

== Events ==
=== January–March ===
- January 4 – Samuel Colt sells his first revolver pistol to the U.S. government.
- January 13 – The Treaty of Cahuenga ends fighting in the Mexican–American War in California.
- January 16 – John C. Frémont is appointed Governor of the new California Territory.
- January 17 – St. Anthony Hall fraternity is founded at Columbia University, New York City.
- January 30 – Yerba Buena, California, is renamed San Francisco.
- February 5 – A rescue effort, called the First Relief, leaves Johnson's Ranch to save the ill-fated Donner Party of California-bound migrants who became snowbound in the Sierra Nevada earlier this winter. Some have resorted to survival by cannibalism.
- February 22 – Mexican–American War: Battle of Buena Vista – 5,000 American troops under General Zachary Taylor use their superiority in artillery to drive off 15,000 Mexican troops under Antonio López de Santa Anna, defeating the Mexicans the next day.
- February 25 – State University of Iowa is founded in Iowa City, Iowa.
- March 1
  - The state of Michigan formally abolishes the death penalty.
  - Faustin Soulouque is elected President of Haiti.
- March 4 – The 30th United States Congress is sworn into office.
- March 9 – Mexican–American War: United States forces under General Winfield Scott invade Mexico near Veracruz.
- March 14 – Verdi's opera Macbeth premieres at the Teatro della Pergola, in Florence, Italy.
- March 29 – Mexican–American War: United States forces under General Winfield Scott take Veracruz after a siege.
- March – The first known publication of the classic joke "Why did the chicken cross the road?" occurs in The Knickerbocker, or New-York Monthly Magazine.

=== April–June ===
- April 5 – The world's first municipally-funded civic public park, Birkenhead Park in Birkenhead on Merseyside, England, is opened.
- April 15 – The Lawrence School, Sanawar is established in India.
- April 16 – New Zealand Wars: A minor Māori chief is accidentally shot by a junior British Army officer in Whanganui on New Zealand's North Island, triggering the Wanganui Campaign (which continues until July 23).
- April 25 – The Exmouth, carrying Irish emigrants from Derry bound for Quebec, is wrecked off Islay, with only three survivors from more than 250 on board.
- May 7 – In Philadelphia, the American Medical Association (AMA) is founded.
- May 8
  - The Nagano earthquake leaves more than 8,600 people dead in Japan.
  - Bahrain's ruler, Shaikh Mohamed bin Khalifa Al Khalifa, signs a treaty with the British to prevent and combat the slave trade in the Arabian Gulf.
- May 31 – Second Treaty of Erzurum: the Ottoman Empire cedes Abadan Island to the Persian Empire.
- May – The Architectural Association School of Architecture is founded in London.
- June 1 – The first congress of the Communist League is held in London.
- June 9 – Radley College, an English public school, is founded near Oxford as a High Anglican institution.
- June 26 – The first passenger railway wholly within modern-day Denmark opens, from Copenhagen to Roskilde.
- June – E. H. Booth & Co. Ltd, which becomes the northern England supermarket chain Booths, is founded when tea dealer Edwin Henry Booth, 19, opens a shop called "The China House" in Blackpool.

=== July–September ===
- July 1 – The United States issues its first postage stamps.

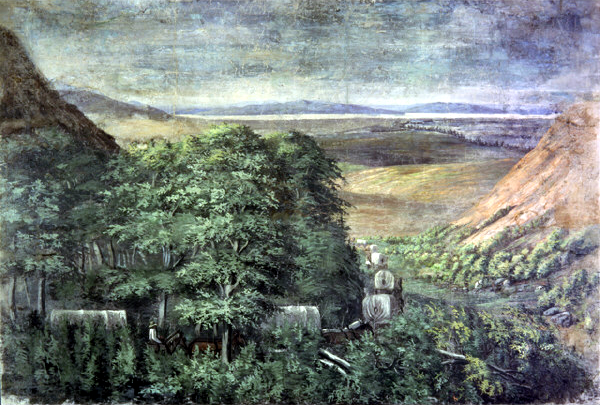
July 24: Mormons expelled from Illinois arrive at the Great Salt Lake.

- July 12 – A riot occurs in Woodstock, New Brunswick, between Catholics and members of the Orange Order that results in up to ten deaths.
- July 24 – After 17 months of travel, Brigham Young leads 148 Mormon pioneers into Salt Lake Valley, resulting in the establishment of Salt Lake City in what becomes Utah.
- July 26 – The nation of Liberia, founded as a haven for freed African-American slaves, becomes independent.
- July 29 – The Cumberland School of Law is founded at Cumberland University, in Lebanon, Tennessee. At the end of this year, only 15 law schools exist in the United States.
- August 12 – Mexican–American War: U.S. troops of General Winfield Scott begin to advance along the aqueduct around Lakes Chalco and Xochimilco in Mexico.
- August 20 – Mexican–American War – Battle of Churubusco: U.S. troops defeat Mexican forces.
- August – Yale Corporation establishes the first graduate school in the United States, as Department of Philosophy and the Arts (renamed Graduate School of Arts and Sciences in 1892).
- September 14 – Mexican–American War: U.S. general Winfield Scott enters Mexico City, marking the end of organized Mexican resistance.
- September 21 – Issue of Mauritius "Post Office" stamps, which will become among the most expensive philatelic items.

=== October–December ===
- October 12 – German inventors and industrialists Werner von Siemens and Johann Georg Halske found Siemens & Halske to develop the electrical telegraph.
- October 19 – Charlotte Brontë publishes Jane Eyre under the pen name of Currer Bell in England.
- October 31 – Theta Delta Chi is founded as a social fraternity at Union College, Schenectady, New York.
- October – The last volcanic eruption of Mount Guntur in West Java occurs.
- November 3–29 – Sonderbund War: In Switzerland, General Guillaume-Henri Dufour's Federal Army defeats the Sonderbund (an alliance of seven Catholic cantons) in a civil war, with a total of only 86 deaths.
- November 4–8 – James Young Simpson discovers the anesthetic properties of chloroform and first uses it, successfully, on a patient, in an obstetric case in Edinburgh.
- November 10 – The first brew of Carlsberg beer is finished in Copenhagen.
- November 17 – The Battle of Um Swayya Spring takes place near a spring in Qatar, after a Bahraini force under Shaikh Ali bin Khalifa Deputy Ruler of Bahrain defeats the Al Binali tribe. The chief of the Al Binali, Isa bin Tureef, is slain in battle with over 70 fatalities from his side.
- December 14 – Emily Brontë and Anne Brontë publish Wuthering Heights and Agnes Grey, respectively, in a 3-volume set under the pen names of Ellis Bell and Acton Bell in England.
- December 20 – British Royal Navy steam frigate HMS Avenger (1845) is wrecked on the Sorelle Rocks in the Mediterranean Sea with the loss of 246 lives and only eight survivors.
- December 21 – Emir Abdelkader surrenders to the French in Algeria.

=== Date unknown ===
- The Great Famine continues in Ireland.
- The North Carolina General Assembly incorporates the railroad town of Goldsborough, and the Wayne county seat is moved to the new town.
- Welfare in Sweden takes its first step with the introduction of the 1847 års fattigvårdförordning.
- Cartier, a luxury brand in France, is founded.

== Births ==
=== January ===
- January 5 – Oku Yasukata, Japanese field marshal, leading figure in the early Imperial Japanese Army (d. 1930)
- January 7 – Caspar F. Goodrich, American admiral (d. 1925)
- January 24 – Radomir Putnik, Serbian field marshal (d. 1917)
- January 28 – Dorus Rijkers, Dutch naval hero (d. 1928)

=== February ===
- February 3 – Warington Baden-Powell, British admiralty lawyer (d. 1921)
- February 4 – Remus von Woyrsch, German field marshal (d. 1920)
- February 5 – João Maria Correia Ayres de Campos, 1st Count of Ameal, Portuguese politician and antiquarian (d. 1920)
- February 8 – Hugh Price Hughes, Methodist social reformer, first Superintendent of the West London Mission (d. 1902)
- February 11 – Thomas Alva Edison, American inventor (d. 1931)
- February 13 – Sir Robert McAlpine, Scottish builder (d. 1930)
- February 15 – Robert Fuchs, Austrian composer (d. 1927)
- February 16 – Philipp Scharwenka, Polish-German composer (d. 1917)
- February 17 – Otto Blehr, Norwegian attorney, Liberal Party politician, 7th Prime Minister of Norway (d. 1927)

=== March ===
- March 1 – Sir Thomas Brock, English sculptor (d. 1922)
- March 2
  - Isaac Barr, Anglican clergyman, promoter of British colonial settlement schemes (d. 1937)
  - Cayetano Arellano, first Chief Justice of the Supreme Court of the Philippines under the American Civil Government (d. 1920)
- March 3 – Alexander Graham Bell, Scottish-born Canadian inventor (d. 1922)
- March 4 – Carl Josef Bayer, Austrian chemist (d. 1904)
- March 11 – Sidney Sonnino, Prime Minister of Italy (d. 1922)
- March 14 – Castro Alves, Brazilian poet (d. 1871)
- March 18 – William O'Connell Bradley, American politician from Kentucky (d. 1914)
- March 23 – Edmund Gurney, British psychologist (d. 1888)
- March 27
  - Otto Wallach, German chemist, Nobel Prize laureate (d. 1931)
  - Garret Barry, Irish musician (d. 1899)

=== April ===
- April 2 – Charles Frederic Moberly Bell, British journalist, editor (d. 1911)
- April 10 – Joseph Pulitzer, Hungarian-born journalist, newspaper publisher (d. 1911)
- April 15 – Yehudah Aryeh Leib Alter, Polish Hasidic rabbi (d. 1905)
- April 27 – Emma Irene Åström, Finnish teacher, Finland's first female university graduate (d. 1934)

=== May ===
- May 7 – Archibald Primrose, 5th Earl of Rosebery, Prime Minister of the United Kingdom (d. 1929)
- May 14 – Sir Frederick William Borden, Canadian politician (d. 1917)

=== June ===
- June 8
  - Oleksander Barvinsky, Ukrainian politician (d. 1926)
  - Ida Saxton McKinley, First Lady of the United States (d. 1907)
- June 10 – Gina Krog, Norwegian suffragist (d. 1916)
- June 11 – Dame Milicent Fawcett, British suffragist (d. 1929)
- June 16 – Luella Dowd Smith, American educator, author, and reformer (d. 1941)

=== July ===
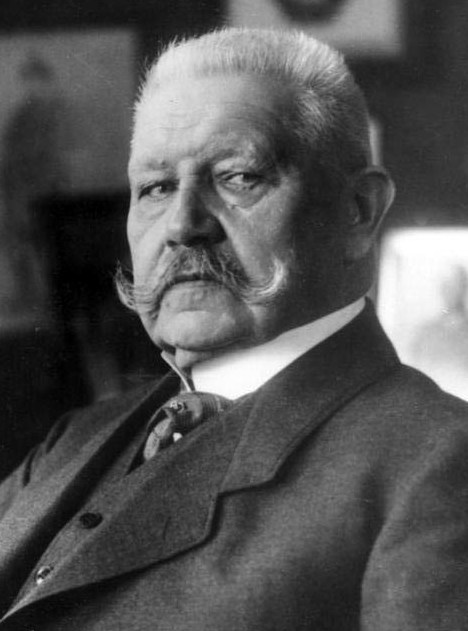
Paul von Hindenburg

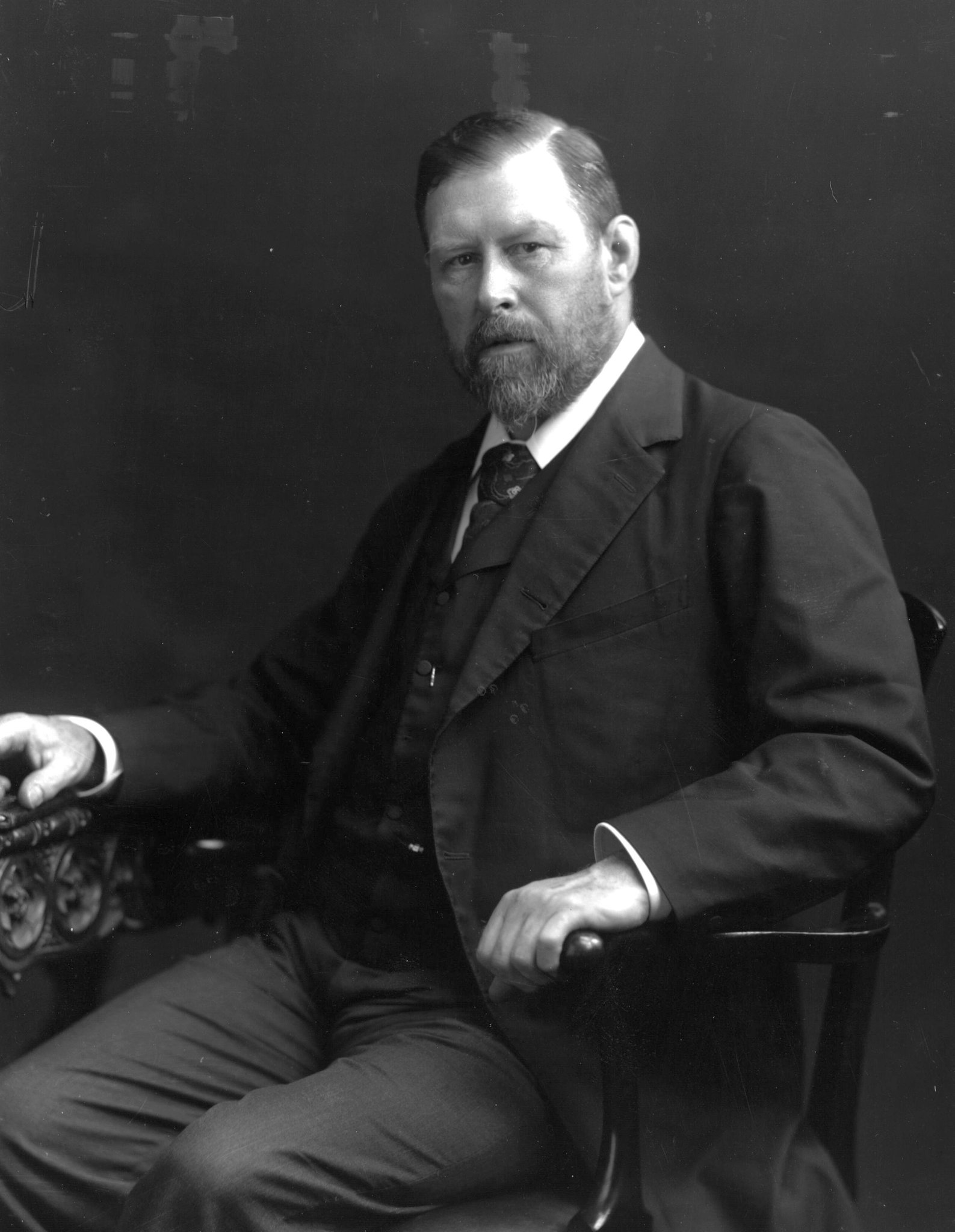
Bram Stoker

- July 2 – Marcel Alexandre Bertrand, French geologist (d. 1907)
- July 9 – Wong Fei-hung, Chinese healer, revolutionary (d. 1925)
- July 13 – Damian Sawczak, Ukrainian judge (d. 1912)
- July 19 – Alexander Meyrick Broadley, British historian (d. 1916)
- July 20
  - Lord William Beresford, Irish army officer, Victoria Cross recipient (d. 1900)
  - Max Liebermann, German painter, printmaker (d. 1935)
- July 25 – Paul Langerhans, German pathologist, biologist (d. 1888)

=== August ===
- August 3 – John Hamilton-Gordon, 1st Marquess of Aberdeen and Temair, Canadian politician, Governor General (d. 1934)
- August 5 – Andrey Selivanov, Russian general and politician (d. 1917)
- August 21 – Hale Johnson, American temperance movement leader (d. 1902)

=== September ===
- September 3 – Charles Stillman Sperry, American admiral (d. 1911)
- September 5
  - Jesse James, American outlaw (d. 1882)
  - Joseph Bucklin Bishop, American journalist, publisher (d. 1928)
- September 17 – John I. Beggs, American businessman (d. 1925)
- September 22 – Enrique Almaraz y Santos, Spanish Catholic cardinal (d. 1922)
- September 23 – Anandamohan Bose, Indian politician, academic and social reformer (d. 1906)
- September 30 – Wilhelmina Drucker, Dutch feminist (d. 1925)

=== October ===
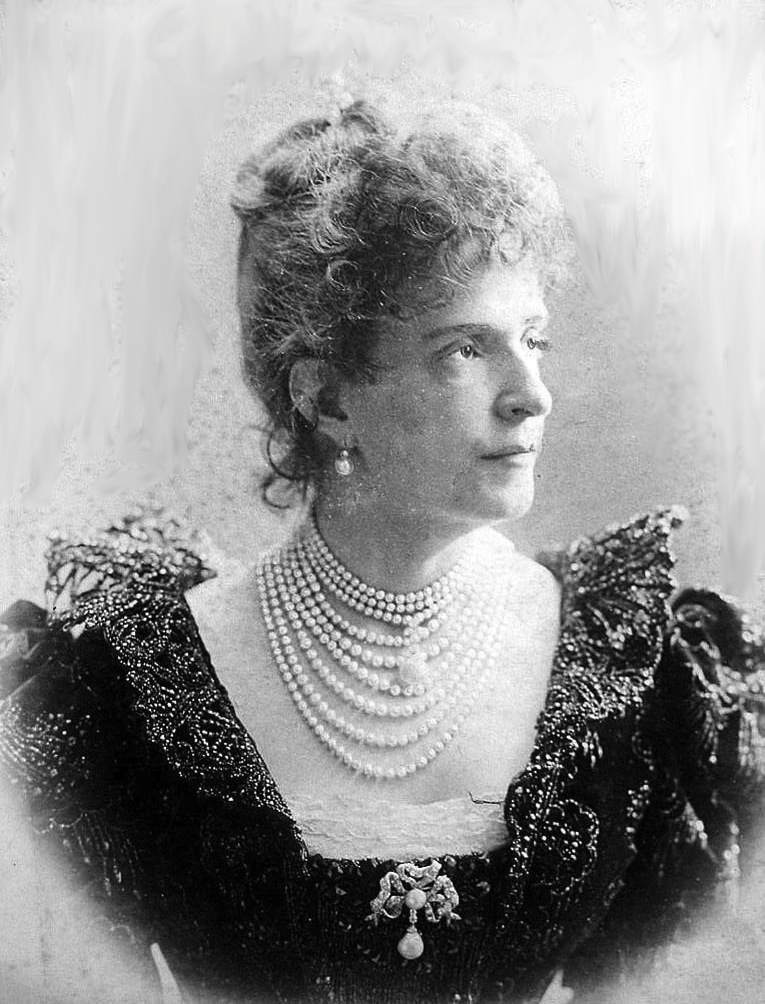
Maria Pia of Savoy

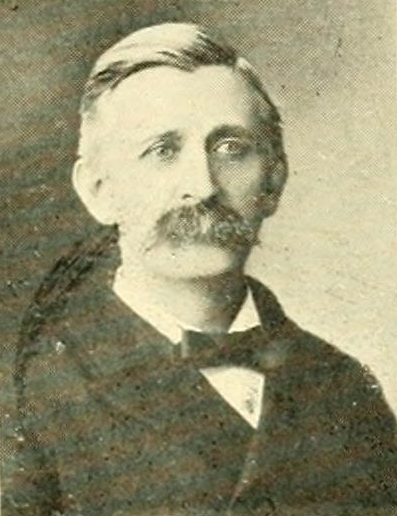
Thomas F. Porter

- October 1 – Annie Besant, English women's rights activist, writer and orator (d. 1933)
- October 2 – Paul von Hindenburg, German field marshal, President of Germany (d. 1934)
- October 13
  - Sir Arthur Dyke Acland, 13th Baronet, British politician (d. 1926)
  - Maurice Bailloud, French general (d. 1921)
- October 14 – Wilgelm Vitgeft, Russian admiral (d. 1904)
- October 15 – Ralph Albert Blakelock, American romanticist painter (d. 1919)
- October 16 – Maria Pia of Savoy, Queen consort of Portugal (d. 1911)
- October 17 – Chiquinha Gonzaga, Brazilian composer (d. 1935)
- October 19 – Aurilla Furber, American author, editor, and activist (d. 1898)
- October 20 – Mifflin E. Bell, American architect (d. 1904)
- October 22 – Koos de la Rey, Boer general (d. 1914)
- October 30
  - Charlie Bassett, American sheriff (d. 1896)
  - Thomas F. Porter, American politician, 32nd Mayor of Lynn, Massachusetts (d. 1927)

=== November ===
- November 1 – Dame Emma Albani, Canadian operatic soprano (d. 1930)
- November 2 – Georges Sorel, French socialist philosopher (d. 1922)
- November 6 – Ugo Balzani, Italian historian (d. 1916)
- November 7 – Lotta Crabtree, American stage actress (d. 1924)
- November 8
  - Jean Casimir-Perier, 6th President of France (d. 1907)
  - Bram Stoker, Irish author of the Gothic novel Dracula (d. 1912)
- November 17 – Carlo Mirabello, Italian admiral and politician (d. 1910)
- November 26 – Dagmar of Denmark, empress of Tsar Alexander III of Russia (d. 1928)
- November 30 – Afonso Pena, Brazilian president (d. 1909)

=== December ===
- December 1 – Agathe Backer-Grøndahl, Norwegian pianist, composer (d. 1907)
- December 9 – George Grossmith, English comic writer and performer (d. 1912)
- December 17
  - Émile Faguet, French writer, critic (d. 1916)
  - Michel-Joseph Maunoury, French general during World War I (d. 1923)
- December 18 – Augusta Holmès, French composer (d. 1903)
- December 21 – John Chard, British Officer (d. 1897)
- December 29 – Alexis-Xyste Bernard, Canadian Catholic bishop (d. 1923)
- December 30 – John Peter Altgeld, American politician, 20th Governor of Illinois (d. 1902)

== Deaths ==
=== January–June ===
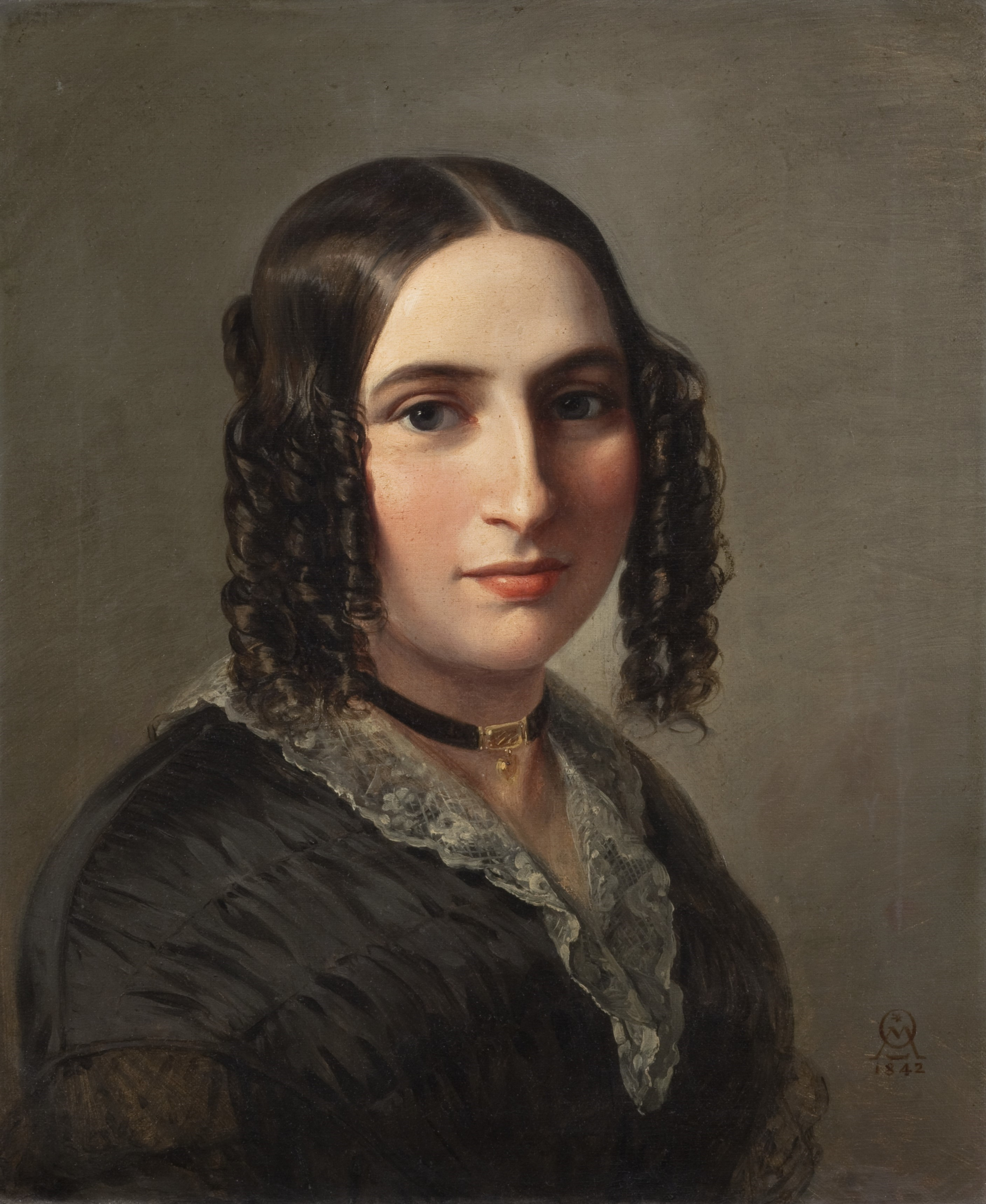
Fanny Hensel

- January 19 – Charles Bent, first Governor of New Mexico Territory (b. 1799) (assassinated)
- February 3 – Marie Duplessis, French courtesan (b. 1824)
- February 5 – Luis José de Orbegoso, Peruvian general and politician, 11th and 12th President of Peru (b. 1795)
- March 9 – Mary Anning, British paleontologist (b. 1799)
- March 3 – Charles Hatchett, English chemist (b. 1765)
- April 21 – Barbara Spooner Wilberforce, wife of British abolitionist William Wilberforce (b. 1777)
- April 30 – Archduke Charles of Austria, Austrian general (b. 1771)
- May 14 – Fanny Hensel, German composer, pianist (b. 1805)
- May 15 – Daniel O'Connell, Irish politician who promoted the Roman Catholic Relief Act 1829 (b. 1775)
- May 16 – Vicente Rocafuerte, 2nd President of Ecuador (b. 1783)
- May 29 – Emmanuel de Grouchy, Marquis de Grouchy, French marshal (b. 1766)
- June 11 – Afonso, Prince Imperial of Brazil (b. 1845)
- June 11 – Sir John Franklin, British explorer (b. 1786)

=== July–December ===
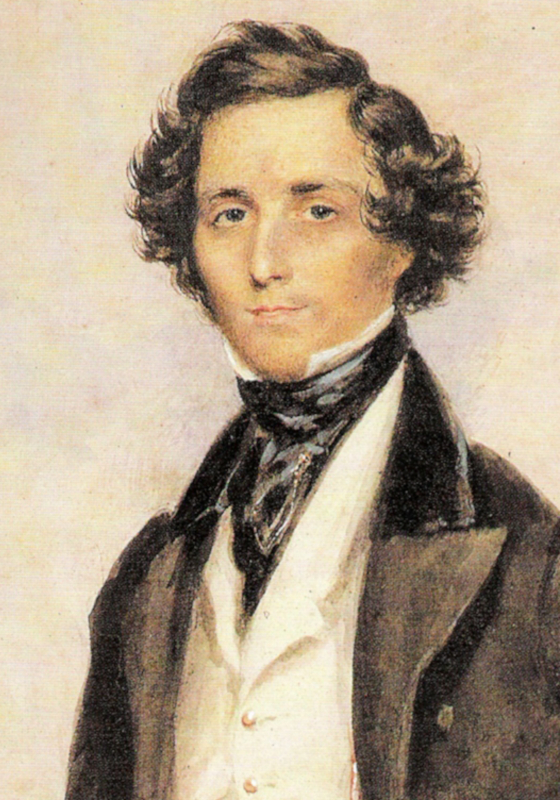
Felix Mendelssohn

- July 7 – Thomas Carpenter, American glassmaker (b. 1752)
- July 16 – Karl Friedrich Burdach, German physiologist (b. 1776)
- September 4 – František Vladislav Hek, Czech patriot (b. 1769)
- September 13 – Nicolas Oudinot, French marshal (b. 1767)
- September 26 – John Oliver Curran, Irish physician (b. 1819)
- October 2 – Vasil Aprilov, Bulgarian educator, merchant and writer (b. 1789)
- October 22
  - Henriette Herz, German salonnière (b. 1764)
  - Negus Sahle Selassie of Shewa (b. c. 1795)
- November 4 – Felix Mendelssohn, German composer (b. 1809)
- November 18 – Zebulon Crocker, American congregationalist pastor (b. 1802)
- December 14
  - Dorothy Ann Thrupp, British psalmist (b. 1779)
  - Manuel José Arce, Central American politician (b. 1787)
  - Barbarita Nieves, Venezuelan mistress of José Antonio Páez (b. 1803)
- Unknown: Jeanne Geneviève Labrosse, French balloonist and parachutist (b. 1775)
