= Battle of Nyárasd =

Battle during Hungarian Revolution of 1848

Coordinates: 47°57′30.5″N 17°48′33.3″E

- Part of the Hungarian Revolution of 1848
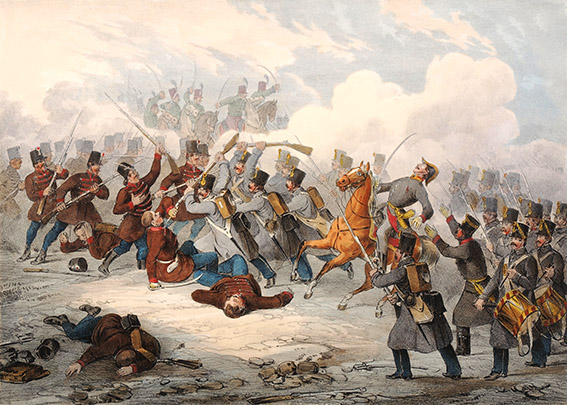
- Battle of Nyárasd, death of Lieutenant Colonel Geramb (Armee Bulletin XV.)
Date	13 January 1849
Location	Nyárasd, Komárom County, Kingdom of Hungary, today in Slovakia
Result	Hungarian victory

Belligerents
Hungarian Revolutionary Army	Austrian Empire

Commanders and leaders
Ferdinand Querlonde du Hammel	Gustav Freiherr von Geramb †

Strength
~1,000 men	Unknown

Casualties and losses
15	33

The Battle of Nyárasd was a battle in the Hungarian war of Independence of 1848-1849, fought on 13 January 1849 between a detachment of the Hungarian Garrison of Komárom led by Colonel Ferdinand Querlonde du Hammel against part of the besieging troops of the Austrian Empire, led by Lieutenant-Colonel Gustav Freiherr von Geramb. The Hungarians defeated the Austrians, putting them to flight, and killing Lieutenant-Colonel Geramb. This battle was one of the couple of skirmishes preceding the Siege of Komárom.

== Prelude ==
In January 1849, the Austrian imperial troops led by Field Marshal Alfred I, Prince of Windisch-Grätz, which attacked Hungary, appeared in the region of Lower Csallóköz. The main target of their advance was the fortress of Komárom, the main fortification in Hungary. The defenders of the fortress were well aware of this and therefore tried to thwart the Austrian plans. From the fortress, military operations of varying degrees of importance were organized on several occasions in an attempt to repel the increasing numbers of enemy troops. In December 1848, Major General Joseph Ferdinand Franz Freiherr von Neustädter stationed one of his brigades here. The first noteworthy event in the vicinity of the town took place on 10 January 1849, when the soldiers of the garrison of Komárom captured eight Croatian Banderial hussars and a corporal under the leadership of Lieutenant Doktorić, who took possession of Nagymegyer.

A few days later, on 13 January 1849, a larger army (1000 soldiers) under the command of Colonel Ferdinand Querlonde du Hammel broke out of Komárom to repel the Austrian troops marching against the fortress. The unit consisted of three battalions of infantry, a company of the Hunyadi Hussars, and two batteries.

== Battle ==
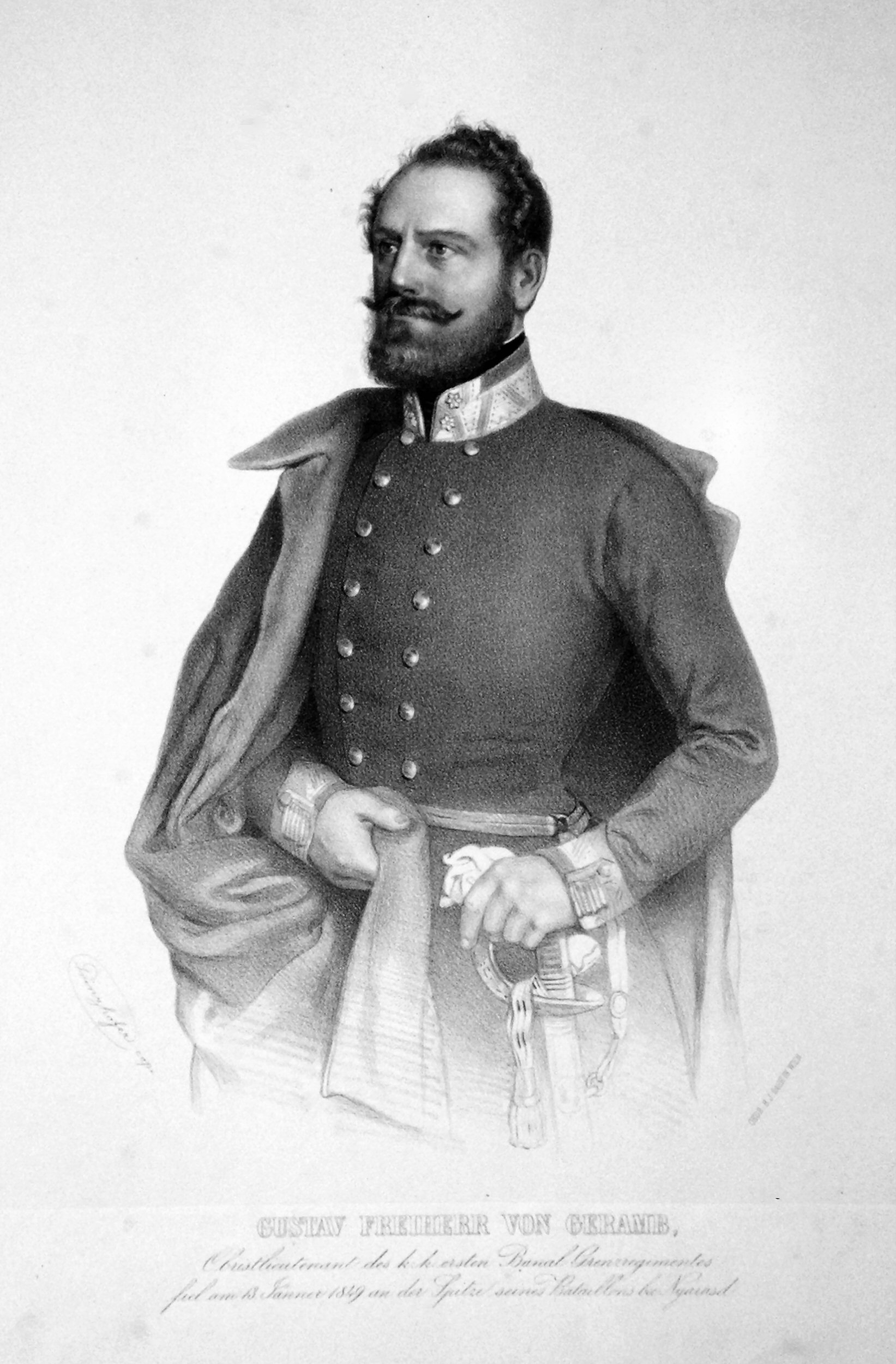
Gustav von Geramb

The Hungarian troop prepared for the departure at 8 a.m. on 8 January 1849 but waited in the snow until 10 a.m. before setting off. Around 1 p.m. they arrived in the area of Nyárasd, where patrols reported that the enemy was already there ready to fight. So the Hungarians took up battle positions. The Austrian army was led by Lieutenant Colonel Baron Gustav von Geramb. But as soon as they took up their fighting positions, the Austrians started firing with their guns at them, especially at the new recruit 37th Battalion, which at first turned to the right to avoid the shells, but as the enemy shells were inflicting increasing losses, they started routing. But at this point, however, the course of the battle was completely reversed, because the commander of the Hungarian artillery, Lieutenant Mihalovich, hit the enemy commander, Baron Geramb, causing him a mortal wound. Meanwhile, the fleeing 37th Battalion also halted, and after an hour of cannonade, Colonel Querlonde sent the infantry and the hussars to attack the Austrians. As a result, the Austrians started to rout, and the Hungarian infantry pushed into Nyárasd, but there they found no Austrians there because they ran away so fast. The Austrians were pursued by the Hunyadi Hussars through three villages. However, the 295th issue of the Pesti Hírlap, published in 1849, criticized the inadequate pursuit of the Austrian army. The Austrians retreated as far as Pozsony.

== Aftermath ==
According to an eyewitness, Sergeant József Szinnyei from the 37th Battalion, there were 3 dead and 4 wounded on the Hungarian side, while from the Austrian side, General Geramb, an artillery lieutenant, and many cuirassiers were killed But the official reports say that 15 people from the Hungarian camp were killed or seriously wounded, while 33 people from the opposing camp were killed or seriously wounded. In the Hungarian press, the 37th Battalion's fleeing honvéds were criticized (The Komáromi Értesítő of 16 January 1849, in an article entitled A few words about the Battle of Nyárasd, written by a Hunyadi Hussar). In the January 18 issue of the paper, A Honvéd from the 37th Battalion responds to the criticism, pointing out that the runners were new recruits, that this was their first engagement, and that because they were not yet used to the horrors of battle, they ran when shells falling between them killed several of their comrades.

Thanks to the battle of Nyárasd, the Croatian border guard units installed at Nagymegyer also left this city on 13 January 1849. From mid-January to the end of February there were no Imperial soldiers in and around Nagymegyer. After the capture of the fortress of Lipótvár on February 2, 1849, part of the imperial troops were sent to Csallóköz. The siege ring around Komárom was only then closed.

In memory of Baron Lieutenant-Colonel Geramb, who was killed in battle, the Austrian authorities had a monument erected in the village after the end of the War of Independence.

== Sources ==
- "Az első nyárasdi csata (The First Battle of Nyárasd)" (PDF). Kemeneshõgyészi HírHozó, 2020 január.
- Varga, László (2015). 1848, te csillag! Az 1848/49-es magyar forradalom és szabadságharc eseményei Nagymegyeren és környékén (1848 you Star! The Events of the 1848/49 Hungarian Revolution and War of Independence around Nagymegyer and its Surroundings) (in Hungarian). Nagymegyer, Dunaszerdahely: Gyurcsó István Alapítvány Könyvek. 64.
