= Dobruška =

- Town
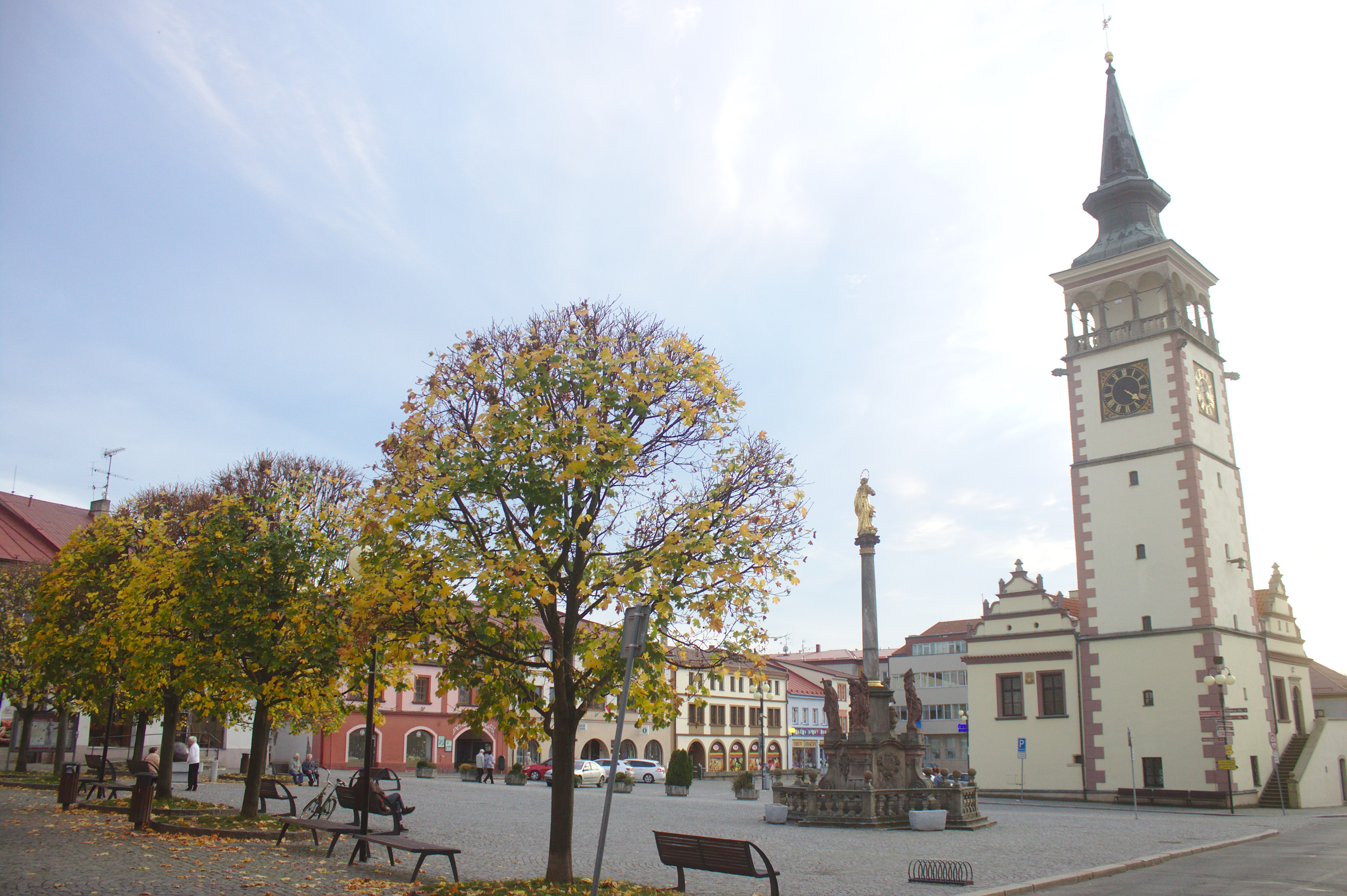
- The square Náměstí F. L. Věka

- Flag Coat of arms

- Location in the Czech Republic
- Coordinates: 50°17′33″N 16°9′45″E
- Country: Czech Republic
- Region: Hradec Králové
- District: Rychnov nad Kněžnou
- First mentioned: 1320

Government
  - Mayor: Miroslav Sixta

Area
  - Total: 34.44 km^{2} (13.30 sq mi)
- Elevation: 287 m (942 ft)

Population (2026-01-01)
  - Total: 6,445
  - Density: 187.1/km^{2} (484.7/sq mi)
- Time zone: UTC+1 (CET)
  - Summer (DST): UTC+2 (CEST)
- Postal code: 518 01
- Website: www.mestodobruska.cz

Dobruška (Czech pronunciation: [ˈdobruʃka]; German: Gutenfeld) is a town in Rychnov nad Kněžnou District in the Hradec Králové Region of the Czech Republic. It has about 6,400 inhabitants. The town proper is located on the Dědina River in the Orlice Table.

Dobruška is known as the birthplace of Czech patriotic writer František Ladislav Hek, whose career was described in Alois Jirásek's novel F. L. Věk. The historic town centre is well preserved and is protected as an urban monument zone. The main landmark of the town is the Renaissance town hall.

== Administrative division ==
Dobruška consists of eights municipal parts (in brackets population according to the 2021 census):

- Dobruška (5,222)
- Běstviny (66)
- Chábory (67)
- Domašín (222)
- Křovice (220)
- Mělčany (84)
- Pulice (388)
- Spáleniště (126)

== Etymology ==
The name is derived from the personal name Dobruš.

== Geography ==
Dobruška is located about 16 kilometres (10 mi) northwest of Rychnov nad Kněžnou and 24 km (15 mi) northeast of Hradec Králové. It lies mostly in the Orlice Table. The eastern part of the municipal territory extends into the Orlické Foothills and includes the highest point of Dobruška, the hill Tábor at 470 m (1,542 ft) above sea level. The town is situated at the confluence of the Dědina River and the stream Brtevský potok.

== History ==
The predecessor of Dobruška was a market settlement called Lešno, located at the crossroads of two trade routes. The first written mention is from 1320. In 1495, with the arrival of the noble family of Trčka of Lípa, the town began to develop. The houses were reconstructed in the Renaissance style and a representative town hall was built. The prosperity and importance of the town ended with the Thirty Years' War.

The large fires in 1806 and 1866 damaged Dobruška and the reconstructions changed the character of the town. At the end of the 19th century, the industry developed, especially the textile industry. In 1908, Dobruška was connected with Opočno by railway.

== Demographics ==
Historical population

Year	Pop.	±%
1869	4,786	—
1880	4,913	+2.7%
1890	4,851	−1.3%
1900	4,828	−0.5%
1910	5,445	+12.8%

Year	Pop.	±%
1921	5,334	−2.0%
1930	5,350	+0.3%
1950	4,736	−11.5%
1961	5,712	+20.6%
1970	6,204	+8.6%

Year	Pop.	±%
1980	6,982	+12.5%
1991	6,893	−1.3%
2001	7,181	+4.2%
2011	6,876	−4.2%
2021	6,395	−7.0%

Source: Censuses

== Economy ==
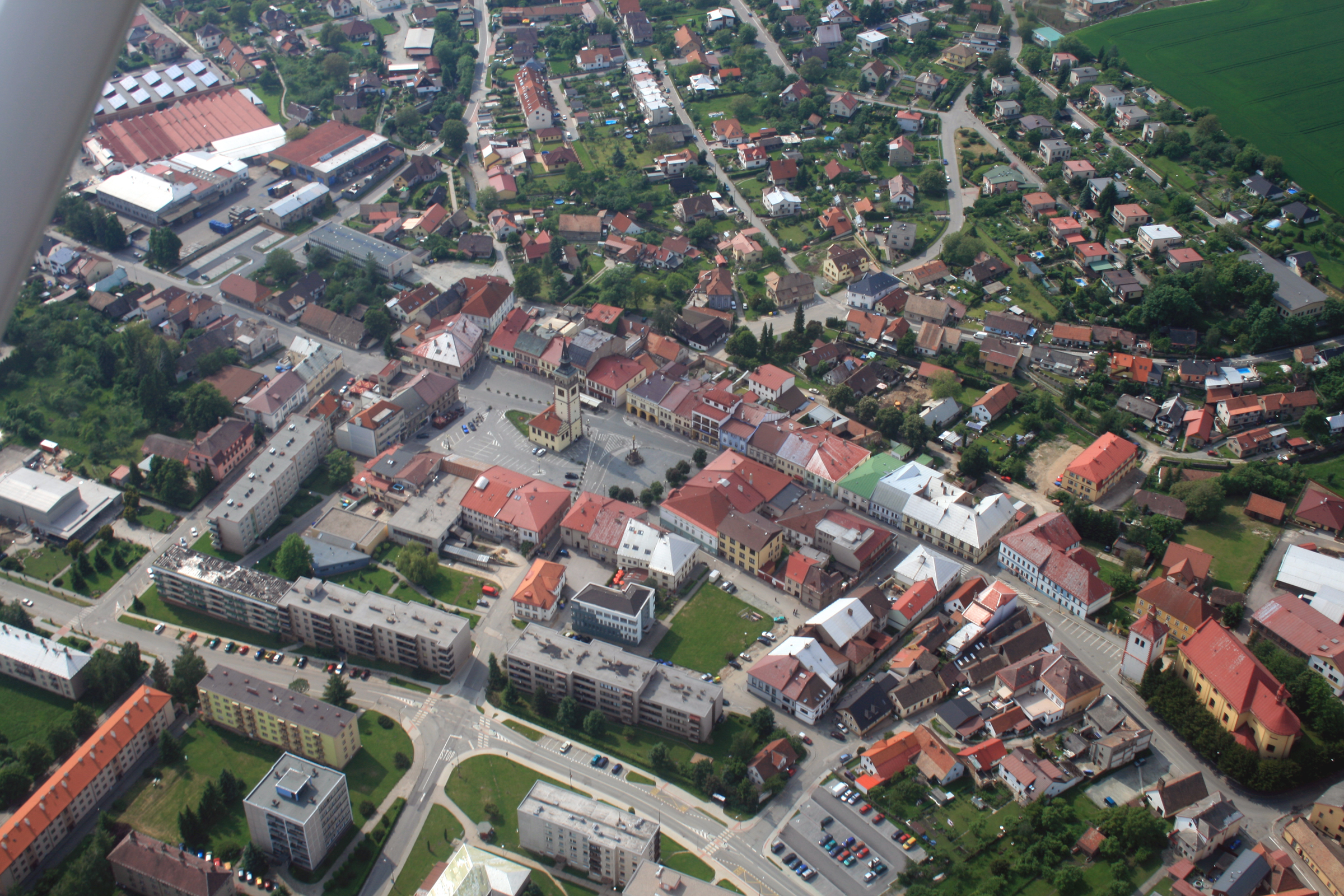
Aerial view of the town centre

The Military Geographical and Hydrometeorological Office is located in Dobruška.

== Transport ==
The I/14 road (the section from Náchod to Ústí nad Orlicí) runs through the town.

Dobruška is the start of a short railway line to Opočno. The line further continues to Meziměstí or to Týniště nad Orlicí.

== Culture ==
The International Music Festival of F. L. Vek is organized in Dobruška every year.

== Sights ==
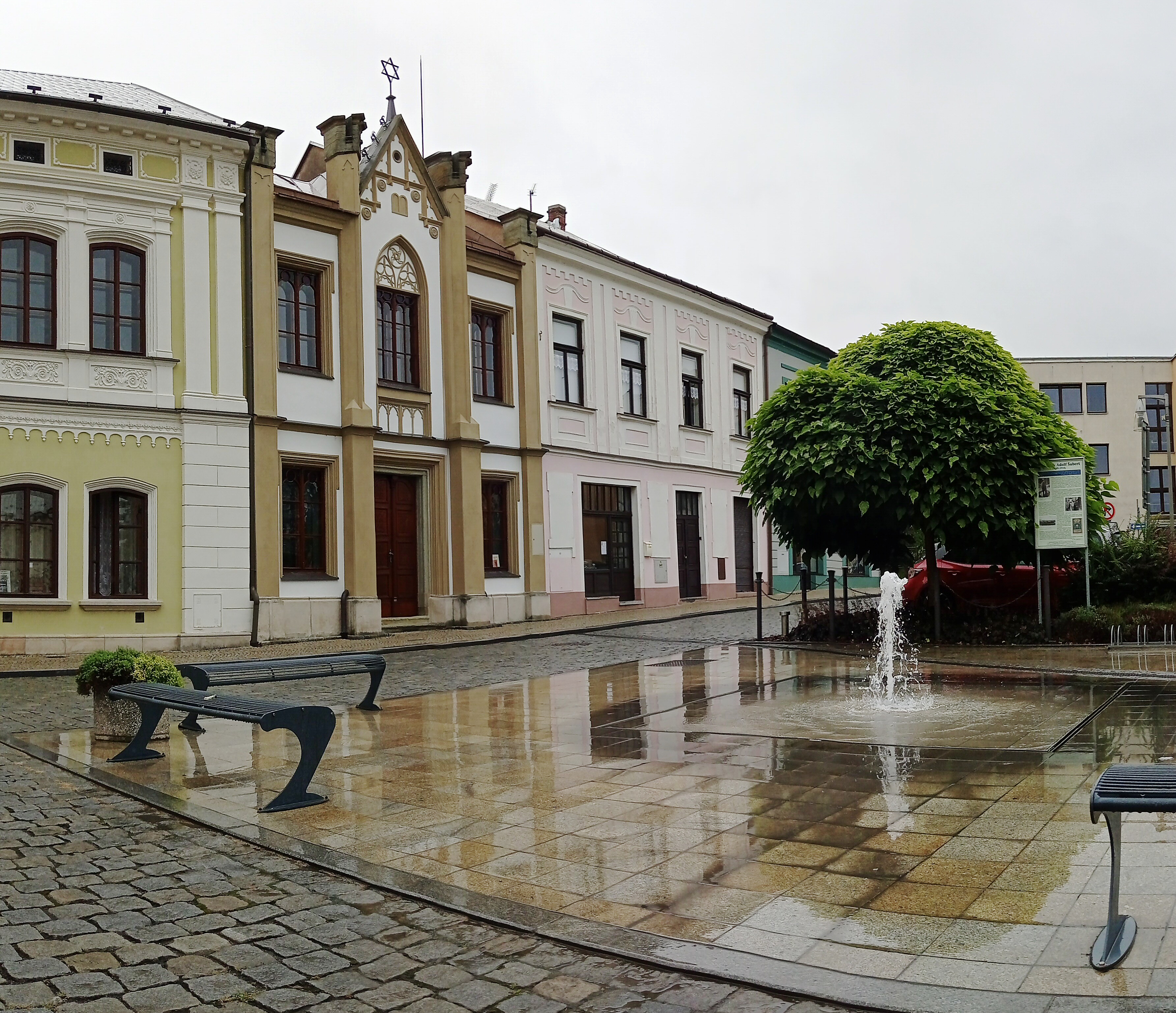
Šubertovo náměstí with the synagogue

The historic centre is formed by the square Náměstí F. L. Věka and adjacent streets. Its main landmark is the Renaissance town hall with a 45 metres (148 ft)-high tower. In the tower is the town museum and art gallery with early works of František Kupka. In the middle of the square is a Marian column from 1733.

The Church of Saint Wenceslaus was first mentioned in 1350. Its part is an early Baroque bell tower. The cemetery Church of Holy Spirit was built in Renaissance style in the 16th century.

The former Dobruška Synagogue is nowadays part of the town museum. The synagogue was built in the 18th century and then rebuilt in the neo-Gothic style in 1867, after it was damaged by a fire. There is also the Jewish cemetery with the oldest preserved tomb from 1688.

== Notable people ==
- Augustin Šenkýř (1736–1796), priest and musician
- František Ladislav Hek (1769–1847), patriotic writer
- Alois Beer (1833–1897), painter
- František Šubert (1849–1915), writer and theatre director
- František Kupka (1871–1957), painter and graphic artist; lived here in 1872–1889
- Radim Drejsl (1923–1953), composer, pianist and conductor

== Twin towns – sister cities ==
Dobruška is twinned with:

- Ábrahámhegy, Hungary
- Hnúšťa, Slovakia
- Miejska Górka, Poland
- Piława Górna, Poland
- Radków, Poland
- Veľký Meder, Slovakia
