= Pasiky-Zubrytski =

Pasiky-Zubrytski Пасіки-Зубрицькі
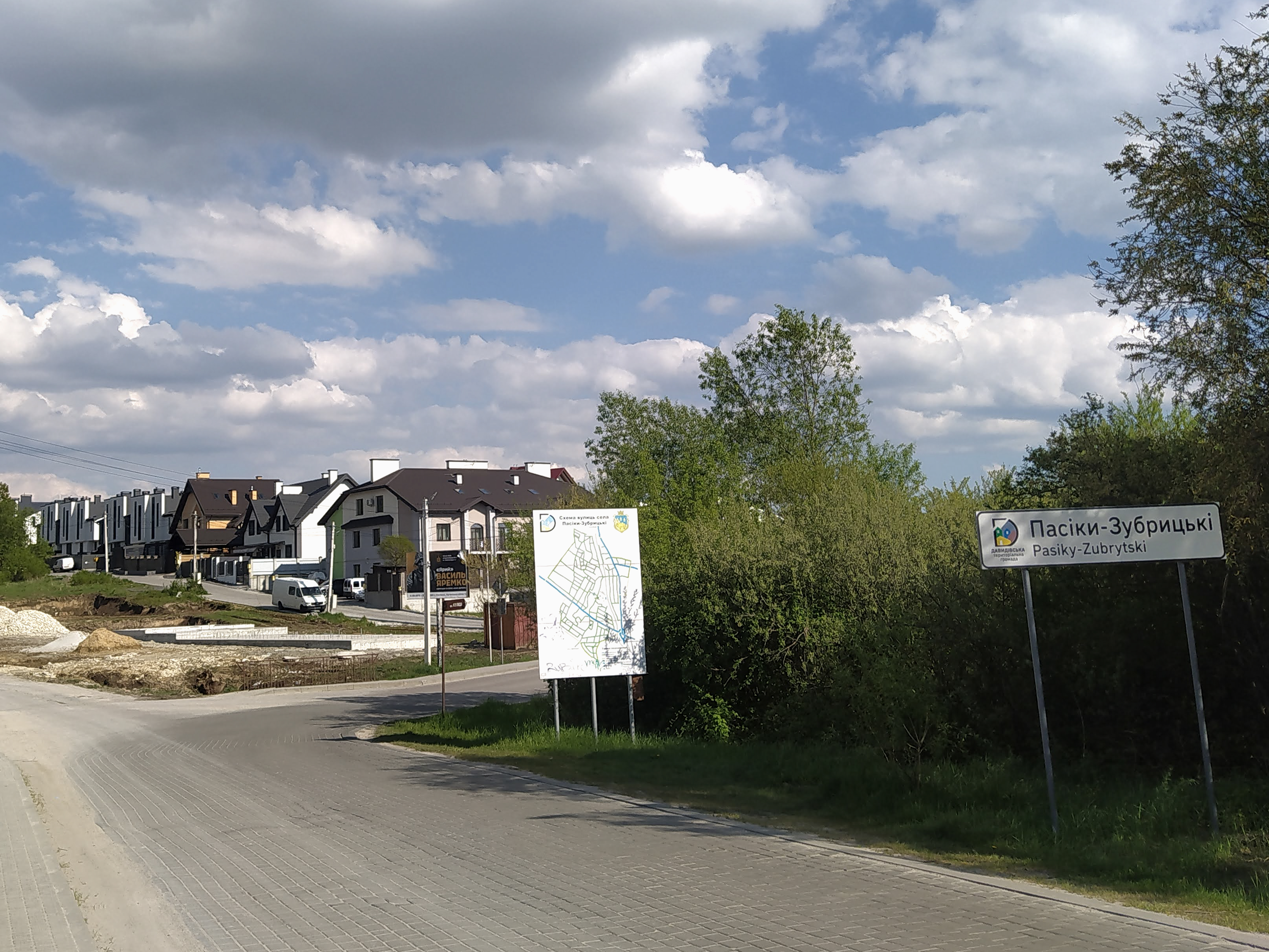

- Flag Coat of arms

- Location in Ukraine Pasiky-Zubrytski (Ukraine)
- Coordinates: 49°46′12″N 24°05′36″E
- Country: Ukraine
- Oblast: Lviv Oblast
- Raion: Lviv Raion

Area
  - Land: 1.72 km^{2} (0.66 sq mi)

Population (2024)
  - Total: 1,992
  - Density: 668.6/km^{2} (1,732/sq mi)
- Postal code: 81137

Pasiky-Zubrytski (Ukrainian: Пасіки-Зубрицькі) is a village in Lviv Raion, Lviv Oblast, Ukraine. It belongs to the Davydiv rural hromada. It has a population of 1,992.

The village has two schools, one of which is under construction, a kindergarten and a school artificial football field. The local government is also seated here. In the center of the village, there is a community health center and a community hall.

== Demographics ==
Native language as of the Ukrainian Census of 2001:

- Ukrainian 99.74%
- Russian 0.26%
