= Davydiv =

Rural locality in Lviv Oblast, Ukraine

Davydiv Давидів
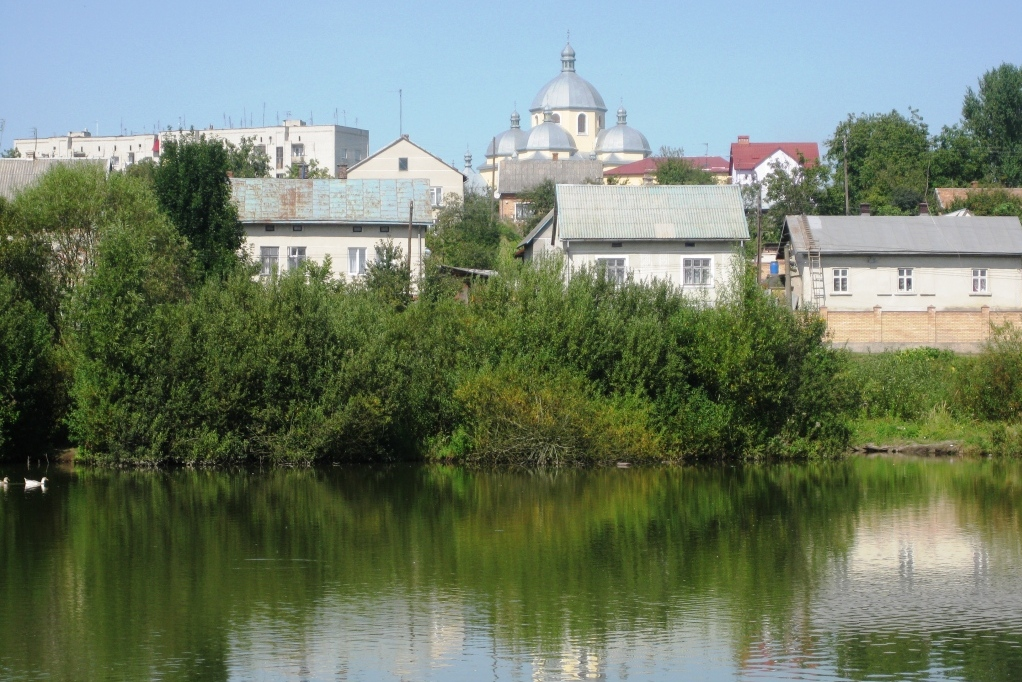

- Flag Coat of arms

- Location in Ukraine Davydiv (Ukraine)
- Coordinates: 49°44′39″N 24°08′17″E
- Country: Ukraine
- Oblast: Lviv Oblast
- Raion: Lviv Raion

Population (2001)
  - Total: 4,557
- Time zone: UTC+2 (EET)
  - Summer (DST): UTC+3 (EEST)

Davydiv (Ukrainian: Давидів) is a village located in Lviv Raion, Lviv Oblast, Ukraine. Davydiv belongs to Davydiv rural hromada, one of the hromadas of Ukraine. The population is 6060 people.

== Demographics ==
Native language as of the Ukrainian Census of 2001:

- Ukrainian 99.69%
- Russian 0.31%
