= Horishnii =

Horishnii Горішній Горішнє
- village
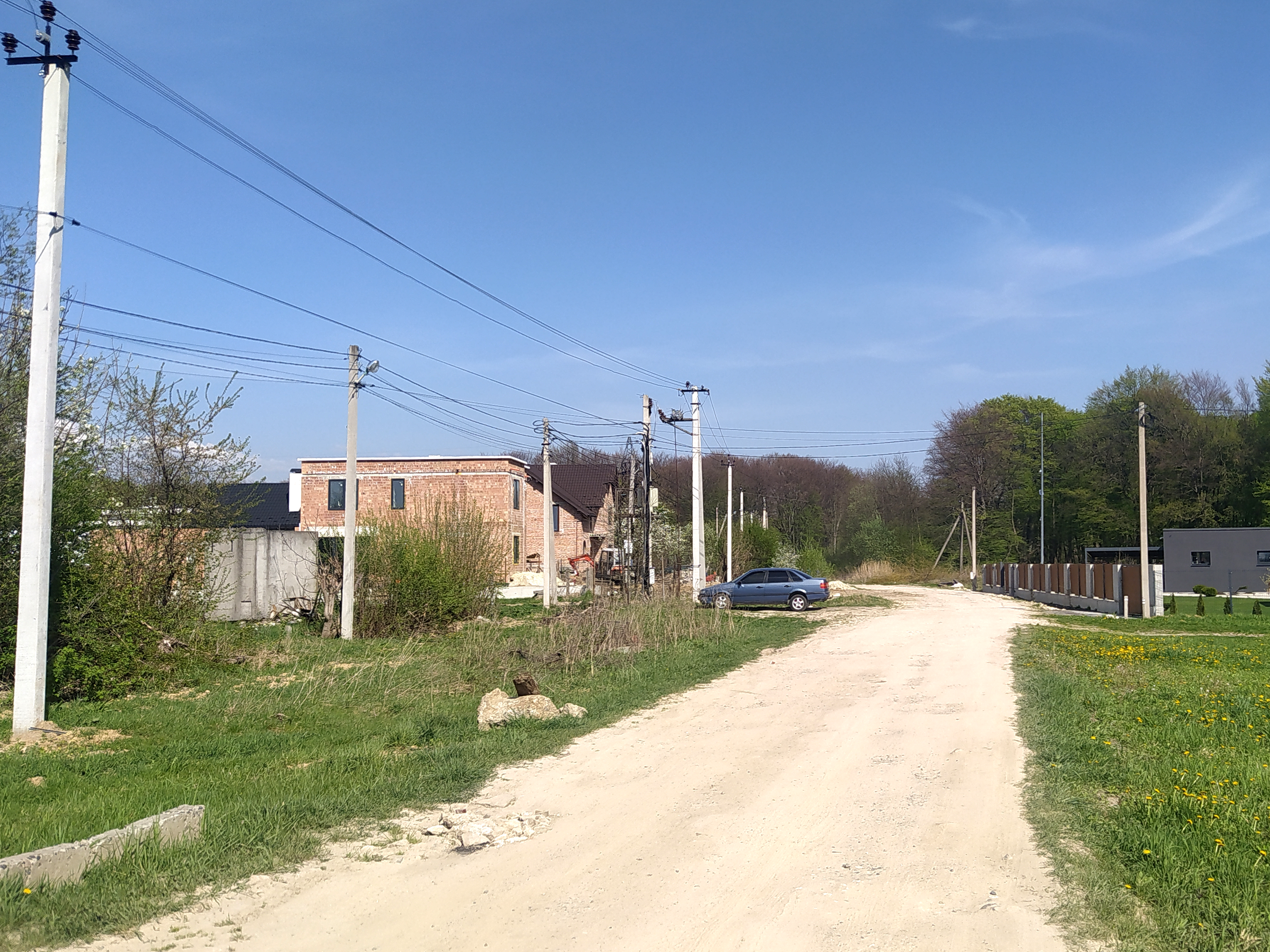
- Berezhanska street in Horishnii

- Location in Ukraine Horishnii (Ukraine)
- Coordinates: 49°47′33″N 24°05′21″E
- Country: Ukraine
- Oblast: Lviv Oblast
- Raion: Lviv Raion

Area
  - Total: 0.85 km^{2} (0.33 sq mi)

Population (2001)
  - Total: 110
  - Estimate (2024): 268

Horishnii (Ukrainian: Горішній) is a village in Lviv Raion, Lviv Oblast, Ukraine. It belongs to Davydiv rural hromada, one of the hromadas of Ukraine. It has a population of 268.

== Name ==
On 18 July 1946 khutor Wulka Hory was renamed to khutor Horishnii by Presidium of Supreme Soviet of Ukrainian SSR.

On 22 June 2023 was proposed to rename village to Horishnie by National Commission on State Language Standards, because the present naming Horishnii refers to the khutor status of the settlement.
