= Veľký Meder =

Veľký Meder Nagymegyer
- Municipality
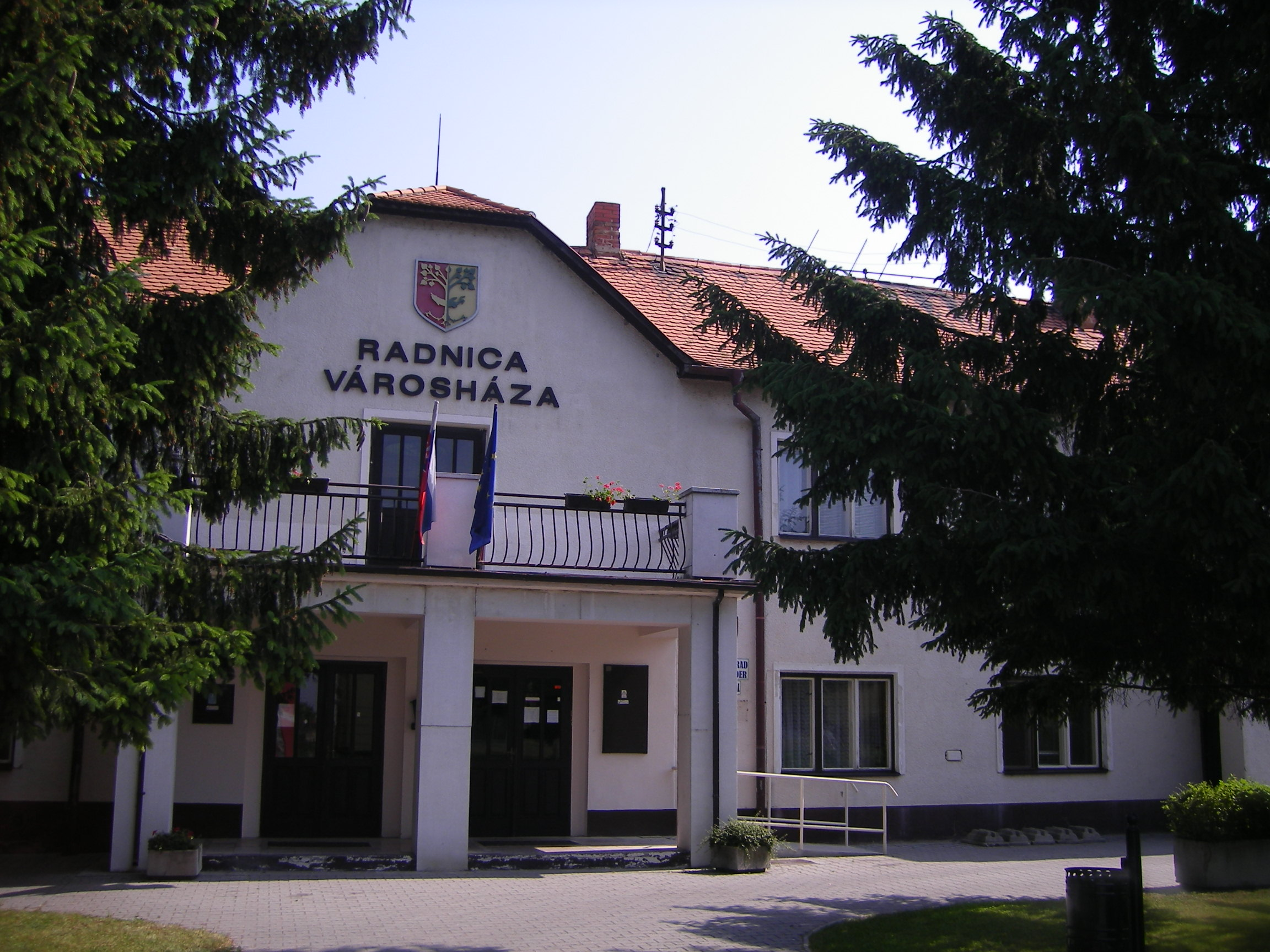

- Flag Coat of arms
- Etymology: Great Megyer deriving from the name of the ancient Hungarian Megyer tribe
- Location of Veľký Meder in the Trnava Region Location of Veľký Meder in Slovakia
- Coordinates: 47.86°N 17.77°E
- Country: Slovakia
- Region: Trnava Region
- District: Dunajská Streda District
- First mentioned: 1268

Area
  - Total: 55.54 km^{2} (21.44 sq mi)
- Elevation: 112 m (367 ft)

Population (2025)
  - Total: 8,163

Ethnicity
- Time zone: UTC+1 (CET)
  - Summer (DST): UTC+2 (CEST)
- Postal code: 932 01
- Area code: +421 31
- Vehicle registration plate (until 2022): DS
- Website: www.velkymeder.sk

Veľký Meder (1948–1990 Čalovo, Hungarian: Nagymegyer, Yiddish: Magendorf) is a town in the Dunajská Streda District, Trnava Region in southwestern Slovakia.

== Etymology ==
The name is derived from the name of the ancient Hungarian Megyer tribe.

== Geography ==
The municipality lies at an altitude of 112 metres (367 ft) and covers an area of 55.54 km^{2} (21.44 sq mi) (2025).

Veľký Meder lies in the eastern part of Great Rye Island, on the western border of historical Komárom County, around 20 km southeast of Dunajská Streda and 35 km northwest of Komárno. Administratively, the town belongs to the Trnava Region, Dunajská Streda District. The town is renowned for its thermal spring.

== History ==
In the 9th century, the territory of Veľký Meder became part of the Kingdom of Hungary. The first written record about Veľký Meder was in 1248 under name Villa Meger. The population of the town has been predominantly Hungarian at least since the Middle Ages. In the Middle and Modern Ages, the settlement was a little market town in the western part of Komárom county. In 1466, Hungarian king Matthias Corvinus gave the town privileges. During the period of 1914-18 (World war I), near the town's railway station, was the location of the Austro-Hungarian death camp Kriegsgefangenenlager Nagymegyer. The Serbian cemetery in Veľký Meder has mass graves and monument to 5,153 Serb and Montenegrin war prisoners who died in the Kriegsgefangenenlager Nagymegyer, Austro-Hungarian POW camp. After the Austro-Hungarian army disintegrated in November 1918, Czechoslovak troops occupied the area, later acknowledged internationally by the Treaty of Trianon. Between 1938 and 1945 Veľký Meder once more became part of Miklós Horthy's Hungary through the First Vienna Award. From 1945 until the Velvet Divorce, it was part of Czechoslovakia. Since then it has been part of Slovakia.

== Population ==
Historical population
Year	Pop.	±%
1970	7,299	—
1980	8,063	+10.5%
1991	9,247	+14.7%
2001	9,113	−1.4%
2011	8,859	−2.8%
2021	8,446	−4.7%
Source: Censuses

Population statistic (10 years)
Year	1995	2005	2015	2025
Count	9310	8968	8703	8163
Difference		−3.67%	−2.95%	−6.20%

Population statistic
Year	2024	2025
Count	8204	8163
Difference		−0.49%

It has a population of 8163 people (31 December 2025).

=== Ethnicity ===
Census 2021 (1+ %)
Ethnicity	Number	Fraction
Hungarian	6845	81.04%
Slovak	1408	16.67%
Not found out	602	7.12%
Total	8446	

In year 2021 was 8446 people by ethnicity 6845 as Hungarian, 1408 as Slovak, 602 as Not found out, 66 as Czech, 41 as Romani, 10 as Other, 5 as Polish, 5 as German, 4 as Ukrainian, 3 as Jewish, 3 as Italian, 2 as Vietnamese, 2 as Rusyn, 2 as Russian, 2 as Moravian, 2 as Greek, 1 as Romanian, 1 as Bulgarian and 1 as English.

Note on population: The difference values of population numbers in the table "Population statistic" and in the sections "Ethnicity" & "Religion" is caused by the use of various statistical methods.

=== Religion ===
Census 2021 (1+ %)
Religion	Number	Fraction
Roman Catholic Church	3445	40.79%
None	2571	30.44%
Calvinist Church	1270	15.04%
Not found out	830	9.83%
Evangelical Church	162	1.92%
Total	8446	

In year 2021 was 8446 people by religion 3445 from Roman Catholic Church, 2571 from None, 1270 from Calvinist Church, 830 from Not found out, 162 from Evangelical Church, 70 from Greek Catholic Church, 24 from Other and not ascertained christian church, 15 from Christian Congregations in Slovakia, 13 from Old Catholic Church, 12 from Jehovah's Witnesses, 8 from Eastern Orthodox Church, 5 from Other, 5 from Buddhism, 4 from Apostolic Church, 3 from United Methodist Church, 2 from Paganism and natural spirituality, 2 from Hinduism, 2 from Ad hoc movements, 1 from Jewish community, 1 from Islam and 1 from Church of Jesus Christ of Latter-day Saints.

== Twin towns — sister cities ==
Veľký Meder is twinned with:

- Ábrahámhegy, Hungary
- Dębica, Poland
- Dobruška, Czech Republic
- Bácsalmás, Hungary
- Győr-Szabadhegy, Hungary
- Mojkovac, Montenegro
- Tápiógyörgye, Hungary
