= Stare Selo =

Rural locality in Lviv Oblast, Ukraine

Stare Selo Старе Село
- Village
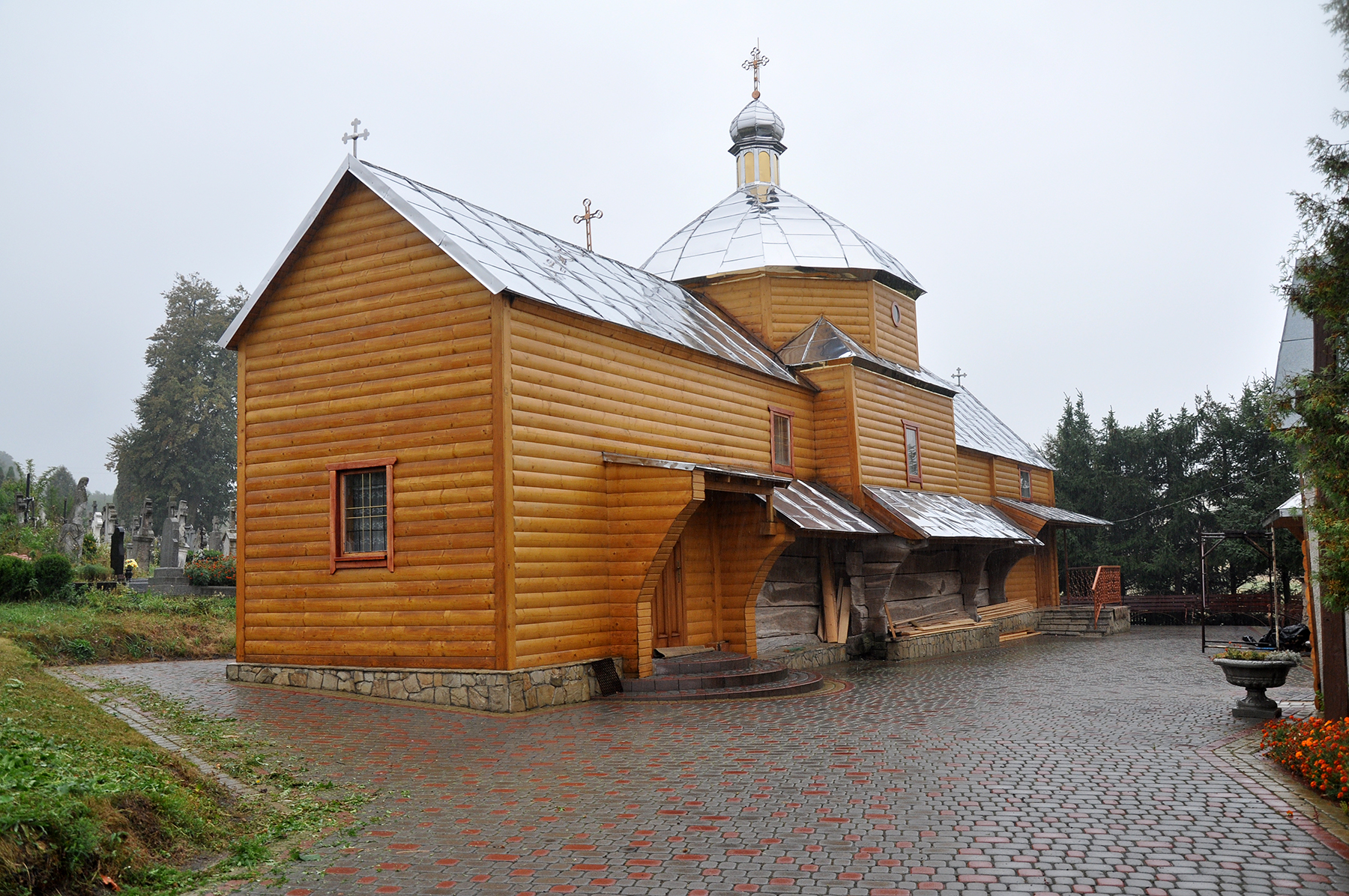
- Wooden church of St. John the Baptist

- Coat of arms

- Location within Lviv Oblast Location within Ukraine
- Coordinates: 49°42′07″N 24°11′41″E
- Country: Ukraine
- Oblast: Lviv Oblast
- Raion: Lviv Raion
- Hromada: Davydiv rural hromada

Stare Selo (Ukrainian: Старе Село; Polish: Stare Sioło; literally, "old village") is a village in Lviv Raion, Lviv Oblast, Ukraine and it is primarily known for the extensive ruins of Stare Selo Castle.

== History ==
Stare Selo is first mentioned in historical documents in 1442. It was reported as having been destroyed by Ottoman Turkish forces in 1498 and by Crimean Tatars in 1648.

== Geography ==
Stare Selo located approximately 25 kilometers southeast of the city of Lviv. It occupies both banks of the Davydivka River. The village is included in the Starosilskyi starosta district (covering Stare Selo and Budkiv), which has an area of 5,445 hectares.

== Demographics ==
Local government documentation for the Davydiv territorial community reports Stare Selo’s population as 2,088 as of January 1, 2024.

== Administration ==
Until July 18, 2020, Stare Selo belonged to Pustomyty Raion. As part of the administrative reform of Ukraine, which reduced the number of raions in Lviv Oblast to seven, Pustomyty Raion was merged into Lviv Raion. Stare Selo is now part of the Davydiv rural hromada.

== Transport ==
Rail transport access is available via two railway stations, one called "22km" and another situated near the castle. Both stops are listed in the official passenger timetable of Ukrainian_Railways.

In addition, regular road transport is provided by bus route 267, which operates daily between Budkiv and Lviv, passing through Stare Selo.

== Landmarks ==
The principal landmark in Stare Selo is the Stare Selo Castle (fortress) that was built for the Ostrogski family in 1584 to 1589 by the architect Amvrosii Prykhylny and later renovated in 1642 and 1654 in a late Renaissance architecture. Portions of the walls (reported as 14 to 16 metres high) and three towers survive.

In 2021, regional reporting on heritage digitization in Lviv Oblast described the fortress in Stare Selo as one of a set of monuments selected for 3D scanning, with outputs intended for promotion and public-facing digital products.

The village also contains historic churches, including an 18th-century wooden church of St. John the Baptist.

Another place worth mentioning is Ururu Park, a large open-air amusement park located in Stare Selo. It covers around 9 hectares and offers attractions for children and adults, including slides, moving dinosaur sculptures and outdoor leisure areas.

== Recent events ==
On August 29, 2016, a vehicle in a convoy associated with Bohdan Kopytko, the owner of Lviv Kholodokombinat, who was born and lived in Stare Selo, was struck by an explosion near Stare Selo and then fired upon with automatic weapons, resulting in multiple fatalities. Reporting in April 2024, Ukrinform (citing the National Police) stated that a court sentenced the organizer of the attempted assassination to life imprisonment.

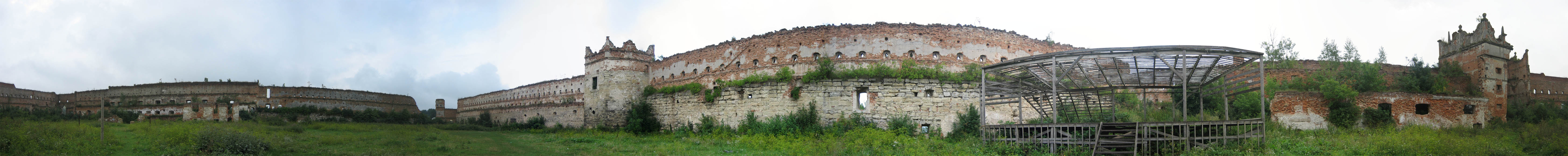
Stare Selo Castle of Prince Zaslawski
