= Davydiv rural hromada =

Hromada in Lviv Oblast, Ukraine

Davydiv rural hromada Давидівська сільська громада
- Hromada
- Seal
- Interactive map of Davydiv rural hromada
- Country: Ukraine
- Oblast: Lviv Oblast
- Admin. center: Davydiv

Area
  - Total: 230 km^{2} (89 sq mi)

Population
  - Total: 20,214
  - Density: 88/km^{2} (230/sq mi)
- Settlements: 23
- Villages: 23
- Website: davydivska-gromada.gov.ua

Davydiv rural hromada (Ukrainian: Давидівська сільська громада) is a hromada in Ukraine, in Lviv Raion of Lviv Oblast. The administrative center is the village of Davydiv.

== Settlements ==
The hromada consists of 23 villages:

- Berezhany
- Budkiv
- Vynnychky
- Vidnyky
- Volytsia
- Hai
- Honchari
- Horishnii
- Horodyslavychi
- Hryniv
- Davydiv
- Dmytrovychi
- Kotsuriv
- Krotoshyn
- Mykolaiv
- Pasiky-Zubrytski
- Pidsosniv
- Sosnivka
- Stare Selo
- Cherepyn
- Chyshky
- Sholomyn
- Zvenyhorod
