= Stare Selo Castle =

Castle in Lviv, Ukraine

Coordinates: 49°42′07″N 24°11′38″E

Stare Selo Castle is a castle in Stare Selo village, Lviv Raion, Lviv Oblast, Ukraine. This castle, or fortress, was built by the princely Ostrogski family.

Its original timber fortifications, first mentioned in 1448, were destroyed by the invading Turks in the late 15th century. A more secure stone fort, intended to defend the Bârlad Road from Lviv to Romania, was built in Stare Selo in the 1580s. Those walls were breached and rendered useless by Khmelnytsky's Cossacks during the Siege of Lviv in 1648.

The existing fortress, almost triangular in shape, with 15-metre high walls and a ceremonial gate on the south side, was commissioned by Prince Władysław Dominik Zasławski, one of the last members of the Ostrogski family. The citadel was erected in 1649-54 and formerly contained the palatial residence of Prince Zaslawski, one of the richest landowners of Eastern Europe and brother-in-law of King John III Sobieski.

After Prince Zaslawski died in Stare Selo in 1656, the fortress gradually fell into disrepair, although it successfully withstood a siege by the Turks in 1674.

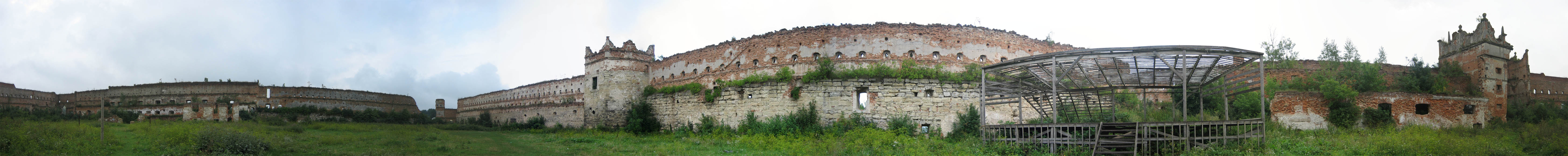
Stare Selo Castle of Prince Zaslawski

== Sources ==
- (in Russian) Памятники градостроительства и архитектуры Украинской ССР. В 4-х томах. К.: Будівельник, 1983–1986. Том 3, с. 186–187.
