= Damian Sawczak =

Damian Sawczak Дем'я́н Савча́к
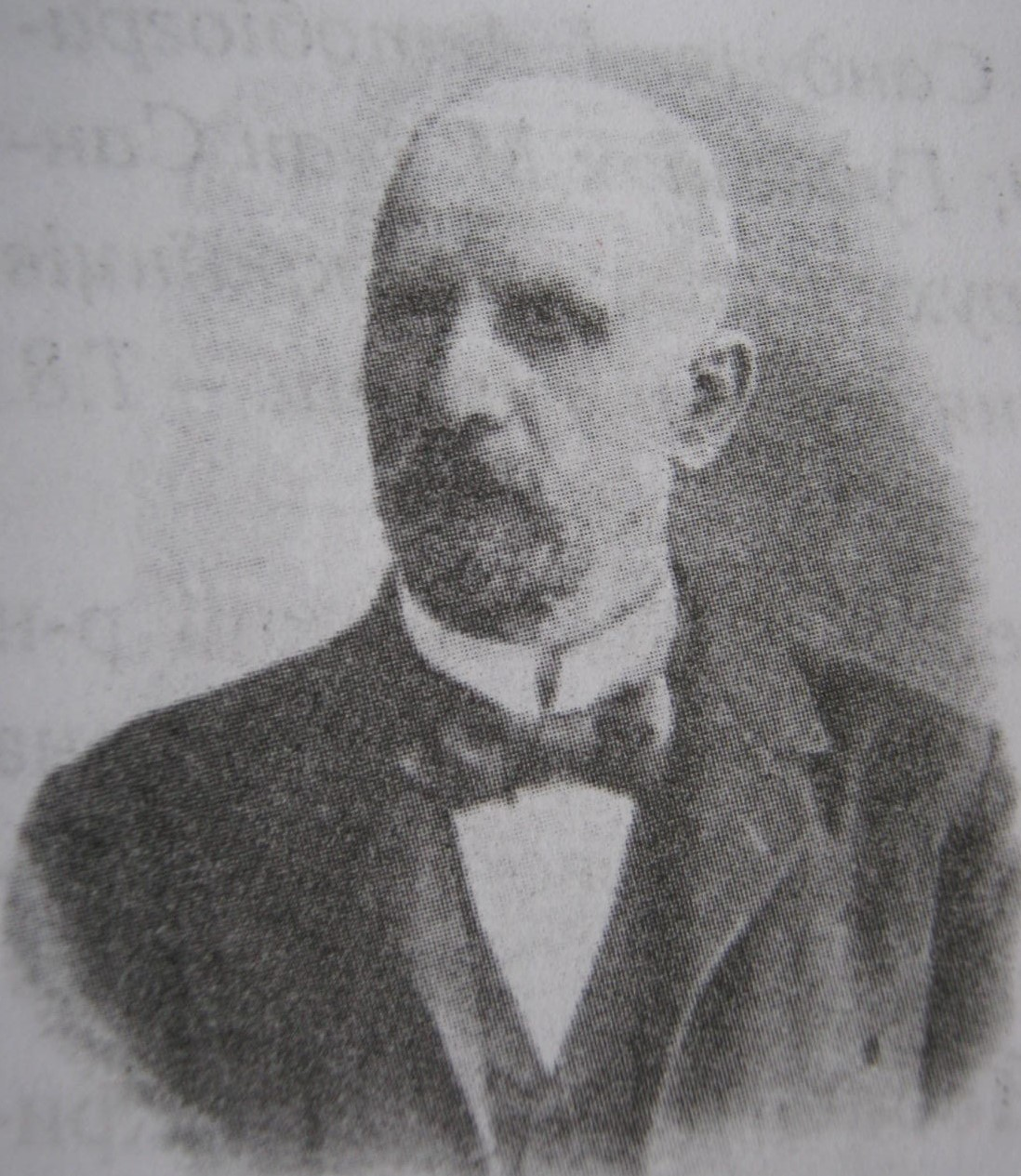
- Born: Дем'я́н Савча́к; July 13, 1847; Nowy Sącz or Nowy Wieś, Austrian Empire (now Poland)
- Died: December 29, 1912 (aged 65); Lemberg, Austria-Hungary (now Ukraine)
- Citizenship: Austria-Hungary
- Occupations: public figure, lawyer, judge, ambassador

Damian Sawczak (Ukrainian: Дем'я́н Савча́к; 13 July 1847 – 29 December 1912) was a Ukrainian judge in Halychyna (Zalishchyky, Khodoriv, Husiatyn). Member of Diet of Galicia and Lodomeria. At a meeting of regional Galician Diet on March 3, 1892 he proposed to open a state gymnasium in Buchach with studying in Ukrainian language.
