= 1847 Zenkoji earthquake =

Earthquake in Japan

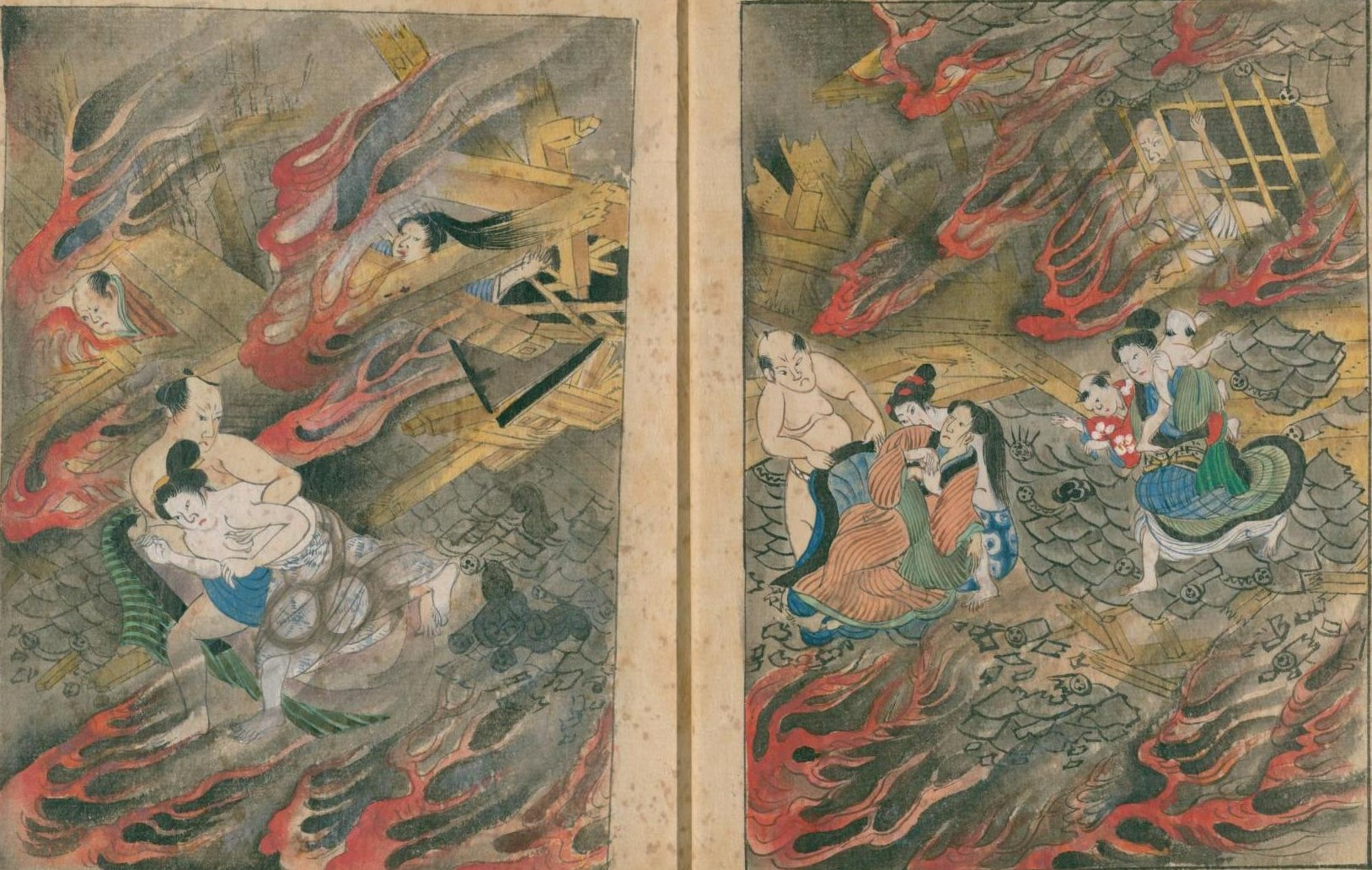

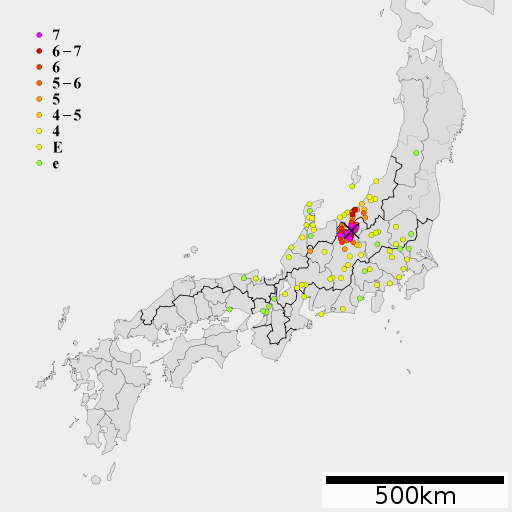

- Location within Nagano Prefecture
- Local date: May 8, 1847
- Local time: 21:30
- Magnitude: 7.4 M_{s}
- Epicenter: 36.7°N 138.2°E
- Casualties: ≥ 8,600

The 1847 Zenkoji earthquake (善光寺地震, Zenkōji jishin) occurred at about 21:30 local time on 8 May at Nagano, Japan. It had a magnitude of 7.4 on the surface-wave magnitude scale. It caused the destruction of many houses in Nagano and at least 8,600 people were killed. The earthquake triggered many landslides, the largest of which dammed the Sai River (a tributary of the Shinano River). 19 days later, the failure of this earthquake dam caused a flood that destroyed many more houses and killed 35 people.

== Tectonic setting ==
During the middle of the Miocene period Japan was affected by the opening of the Sea of Japan as a back-arc basin in response to continuing subduction of the Pacific plate. This period of extensional tectonics caused the development of rift basins on the western side of Honshu, including the northern part of the Fossa Magna. When the back-arc spreading stopped during the late Miocene, the rifted area started to shorten and the basins became inverted. The western margin of the Nagano Basin, part of the Fossa Magna, is formed by an active reverse fault zone, the West Nagano Basin Fault. The 1847 earthquake was caused by rupture on part of this fault zone.

== Landslides ==
The earthquake triggered a large number of landslides, due mainly the relatively unconsolidated Miocene sediments. At least seven of these formed dams on rivers in the surrounding area. The largest of these dams was formed at the foot of Mount Iwakura from a landslide with an estimated volume of 20 million cubic metres that blocked the Sai River. The water held back by the dam eventually broke through 19 days after the earthquake, flooding a large area downstream from the dam.
