= Exmouth (1818 brig) =

19th c. English ship

History

United Kingdom
- Name: Exmouth
- Route: Port of Londonderry to Port of Quebec
- Launched: 1818
- In service: 1818
- Out of service: 1847
- Home port: North Shields
- Fate: Wrecked on cliffs during storm 1847

General characteristics
- Class & type: Brig
- Tons burthen: 320 (bm)
- Length: 96 ft 9 in (29.5 m)
- Beam: 27 ft 8 in (8.4 m)
- Depth: 17 ft 6 in (5.3 m)
- Sail plan: Square rigged
- Crew: 11

The Exmouth was a brig built in 1818. She was classed as a snow in Lloyd's Register of 1845. She worked as a whaler in the British northern whale fishery prior to her life as an emigrant ship sailing between Londonderry and Quebec. She was wrecked against the south side of the Isle of Islay in 1847 during a storm. Two hundred and forty-one people lost their lives; three crewmen survived.

== Build and Service ==
Exmouth was built in North Shields, Northumberland in 1818. She had one deck and three masts.

=== Whaler ===
Exmouth first appeared in Lloyd's Register (LR) in 1819. She made six voyages as a whaler, sailing annually between Hull and Greenland (GR) or Davis Strait (DS).

Year	Master	Owner	Trade	Source
1819	Thompson	Wright & Co.	Hull–Greenland	LR

Year	Master	Where	Whales	Tuns whale oil
1818	Thompson	GR	9	154
1819	Thompson	GR	7	99
1820	Thompson	GR	13	147
1821	Thompson	GR	1	5
1822	Thompson	GR	6	103
1823	Thompson	GR	2	10
1824	Munro	GR	4	45
1825	Munro	DS	11	140
Source	Coltish			

=== Merchantman ===
Year	Master	Owner	Trade	Source & notes
1826	W.Munro; J.Hart	Wright & Co.	Hull–Greenland	LR; small repairs 1823 & 1825

Lloyd's Register recorded a large repair carried out in 1829 and some further repairs in 1833.

She sailed between English ports and Quebec and Miramichi for the rest of her working life. Her crew worked under Masters Hart, Greig, Eden, and her final captain, Isaac Booth.

A number of incidents were noted in her service. On 16 January 1839, Exmouth, Eden, master, came "into contact" with Rainbow during a gale at Bridlington. Rainbow foundered; Exmouth rescued the crew. On 17 December 1843, Exmouth "got up onto the beach" near Yarmouth while sailing between Shields and London. She was assisted off the sand and continued on her way. On 2 March 1844 she was run into by an unidentified ship in Robin Hood's Bay. She lost her bowsprit and jib boom and her bright heads were strained.

Year	Master	Owner	Trade	Source & notes
1846	J.Booth	J.Eden	Shields–America	LR; large repairs 1829 & 1833, and small repairs 1844 & 1846

== Loss at sea ==
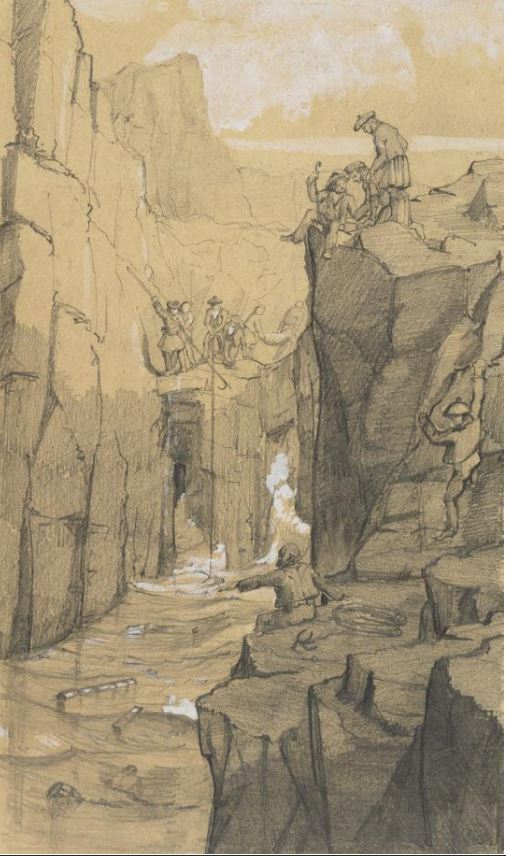
Fishing out the bodies of the Exmouth by John Francis Campbell

According to Lloyd's List, Exmouth left Londonderry on 23 April 1847. Eyewitness reports after the wreck reported that she left port in the early hours of Sunday 25 April 1847. The ship was registered for 165.5 passengers. Children counted as one half and infants were not counted at all. 241 seems to be the accepted number of souls on board for her last voyage.

There were three survivors of the wreck. The description of events is based upon their reports to authorities in the subsequent days. The ship left Londonderry in light winds, but met severe gales on the following two days. A life boat was lost and sails were damaged in the heavy winds and waves on Monday 26 April. The Captain tried to keep close to the coast in the hope that they could reach a harbour to make repairs to the ship. On Tuesday evening, conditions had not improved. A light was seen to starboard that the witnesses claimed the Captain thought was Tory Island off the coast of Ireland. This would have given the ship ample sea room to manoeuvre. However it quickly became clear that the light was in fact the lighthouse on the Rhinns of Islay. Despite the crews efforts, the ship became caught in the broken water and was dashed broadside against the rocks at 12.30am on Wednesday 28 April.

The Captain was already on the maintop acting as lookout. Eight of the crew initially joined him, but five descended again to attempt to reach safety from the foretop. Of the four men left on the maintop, the three seamen used the rigging to gain a footing among the rock crags. They spoke briefly to the Captain before a wave washed him away and dragged the ship back out to sea.

There was no time for the ship's passengers to attempt to abandon ship. Most probably did not even leave their cramped berths. They were all lost.

== Aftermath ==
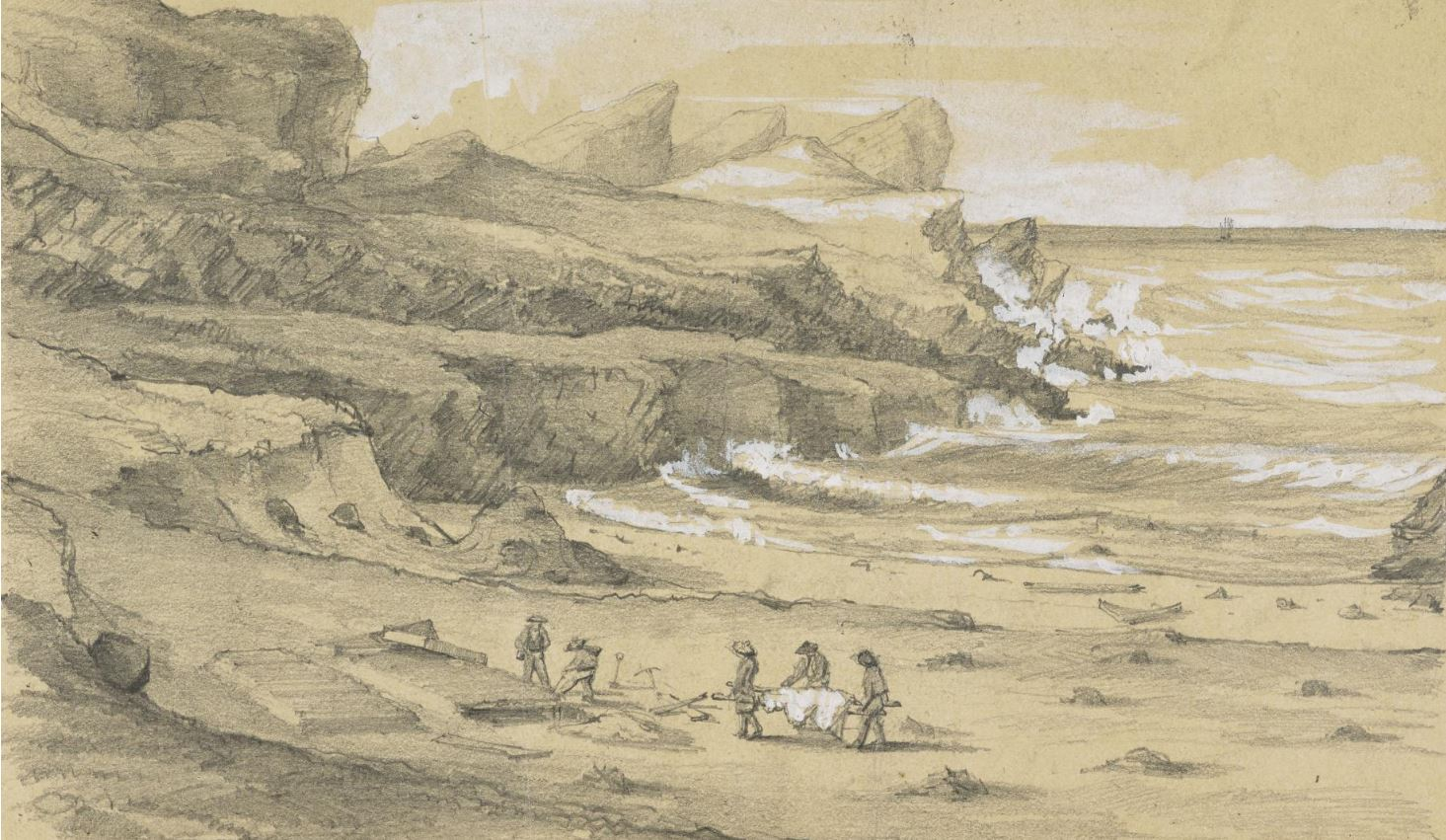
The grave of the crew of the Exmouth Castle

The three surviving crewmen, all from South Shields, spent the night in a crevice. In the morning they made their way to a nearby farmhouse. Attempts by the islanders to effect a rescue were in vain as the ship had been broken into fragments. The factor of the island arranged transport for the survivors to Glasgow where they made their report.

By 4 June, 108 naked and badly mutilated bodies had been recovered, most of them were women and children. Their remains were buried behind the beach (Traigh Bhan) at Sanaigmore Bay, Islay (at 55.849937°N 6.417622°W); a memorial to the dead was unveiled by the Irish Consul-General in 2000.

A Government emigration agent, Lieutenant Ramsay made a formal report accounting the lives lost as 220. These were described as 74 male emigrants, 62 female emigrants, 29 male children under fourteen years old, 34 female children under 14 years old, 9 infants, 3 cabin passengers and 9 crew members. The ship was in a "perfect state of repair... properly fitted out for emigrants... She was well provisioned, and was supplied with three suitable boats, with every requisite for their use, and two life buoys."

The cause of the disaster was agreed to be ultimately the adverse weather conditions. However, concerns were raised about the standard of crew on emigrant ships, both their number as well as their quality. The captain's failure to identify the lighthouse on Islay was of particular note. At the time, ship's Captains were encouraged to submit their qualifications and receive a certificate in competency, but there was no legal obligation to do so.

Lloyd's Register carried the annotation "wrecked" by Exmouth's name.

== Memorial ==
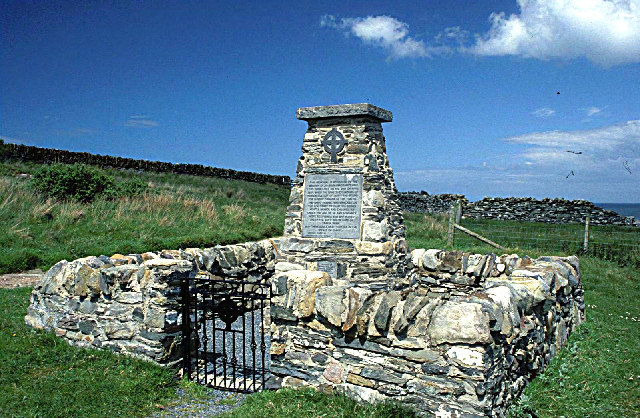
Memorial to the brig The Exmouth of Newcastle. - geograph.org.uk - 67156

A memorial to the dead was erected at Sanaigmore Bay and unveiled on 23 June 2000. The text reads "This memorial is dedicated to the memory of the 241 Irish emigrants who lost their lives on the 28th April 1847, when the brig 'The Exmouth of Newcastle' out of Derry and bound for Quebec Canada at the time of the great famine, was wrecked on the n/w coast of Islay. 108 bodies, mostly women and children (63 under the age of 14 and 9 infants) were recovered and are buried under the soft green turf of Traigh Bhan. May their souls rest forever in the Peace of Christ".

== Citations & references ==
Citations

References

- Coltish, William (c. 1842). An account of the success of the ships at the Greenland and Davis Straits fisheries 1772-1842 inclusive.
