= František Vladislav Hek =

Czech writer

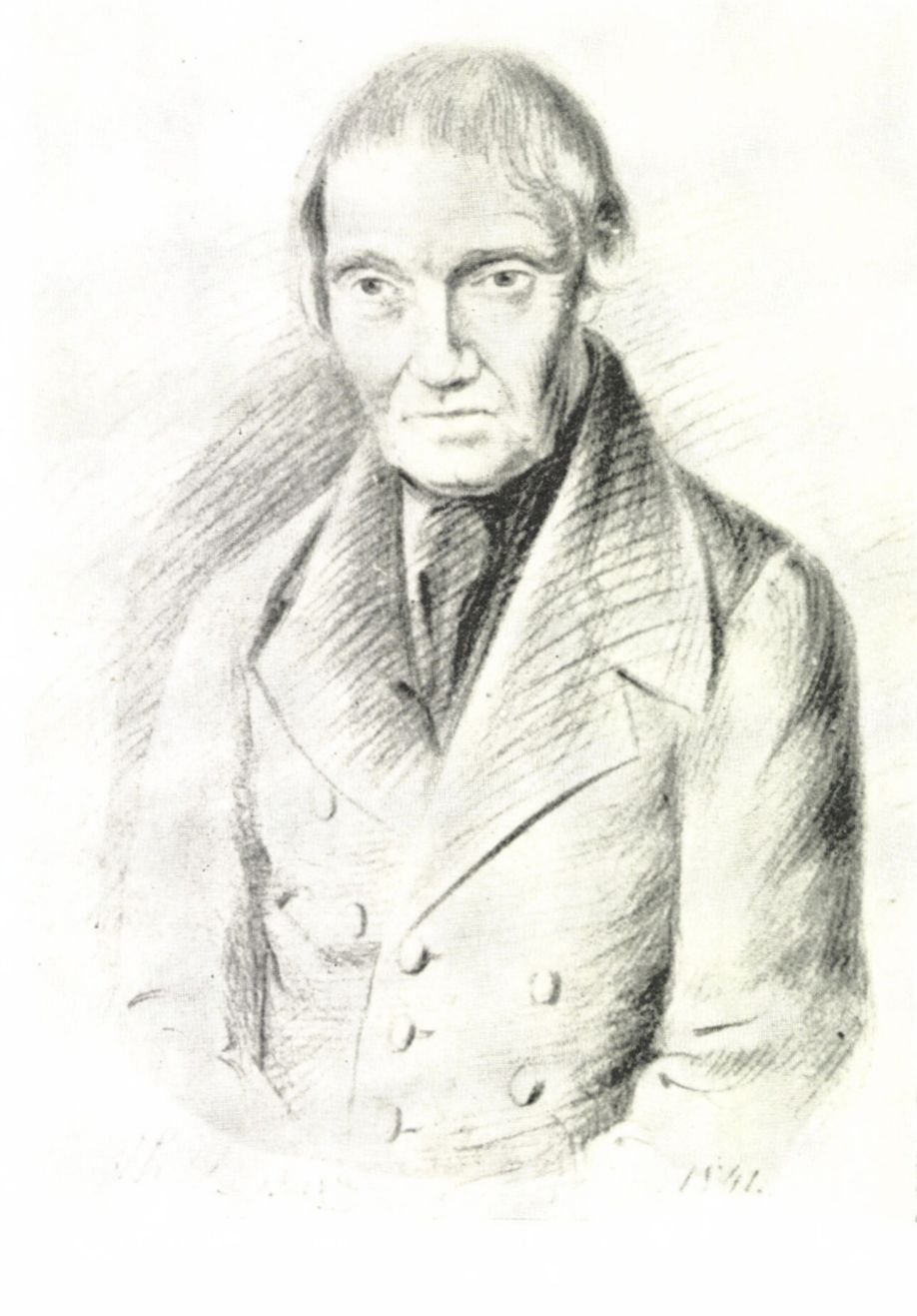
- Drawing of Hek by Theophil Reichel (1841)
- Born: 11 April 1769; Dobruška, Kingdom of Bohemia
- Died: 4 September 1847 (aged 78); Kyšperk, Austrian Empire
- Occupations: Writer, bookseller, composer
- Spouse: Maria Anna Hek (m. 1792; died 1821)
- Writing career
- Pen name: Anteprenumerarius; Antisulcius; Dobrota Smíchorád; J. Toužil; Vladislav Žerotín z Dobrovice
- Language: Czech, German

Signature
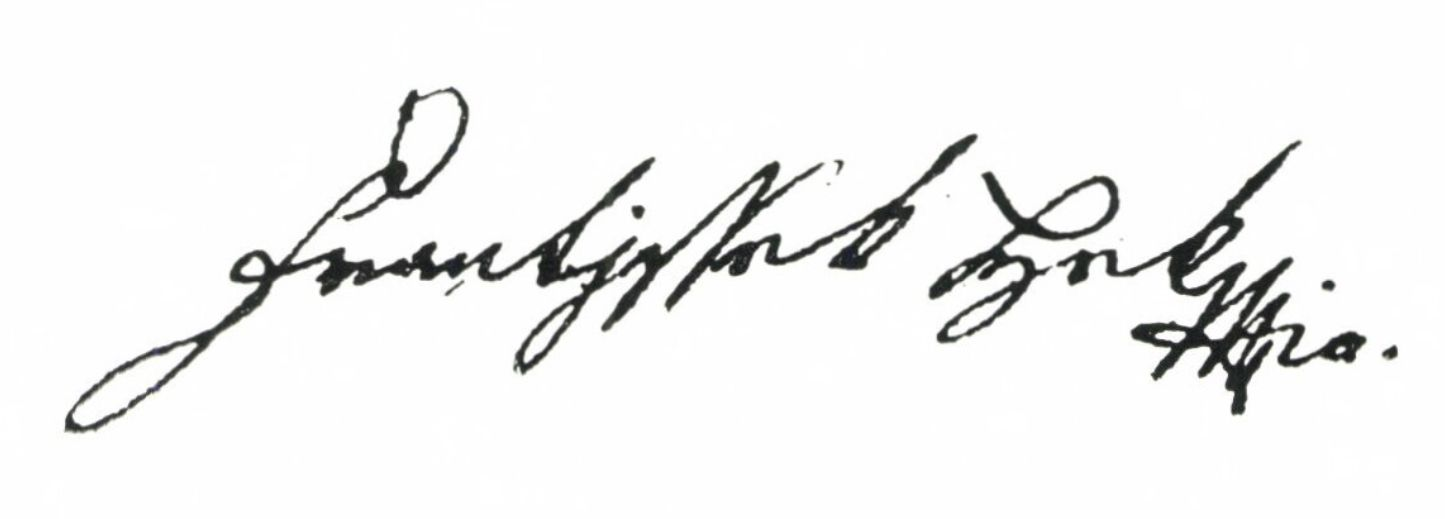

František Vladislav Hek (11 April 1769 – 4 September 1847) was a Czech writer, bookseller, composer and patriot. He was active in the early phases of the Czech National Revival. He was a major inspiration behind the fictionalized novel F. L. Věk (1906) by Alois Jirásek.

== Biography ==
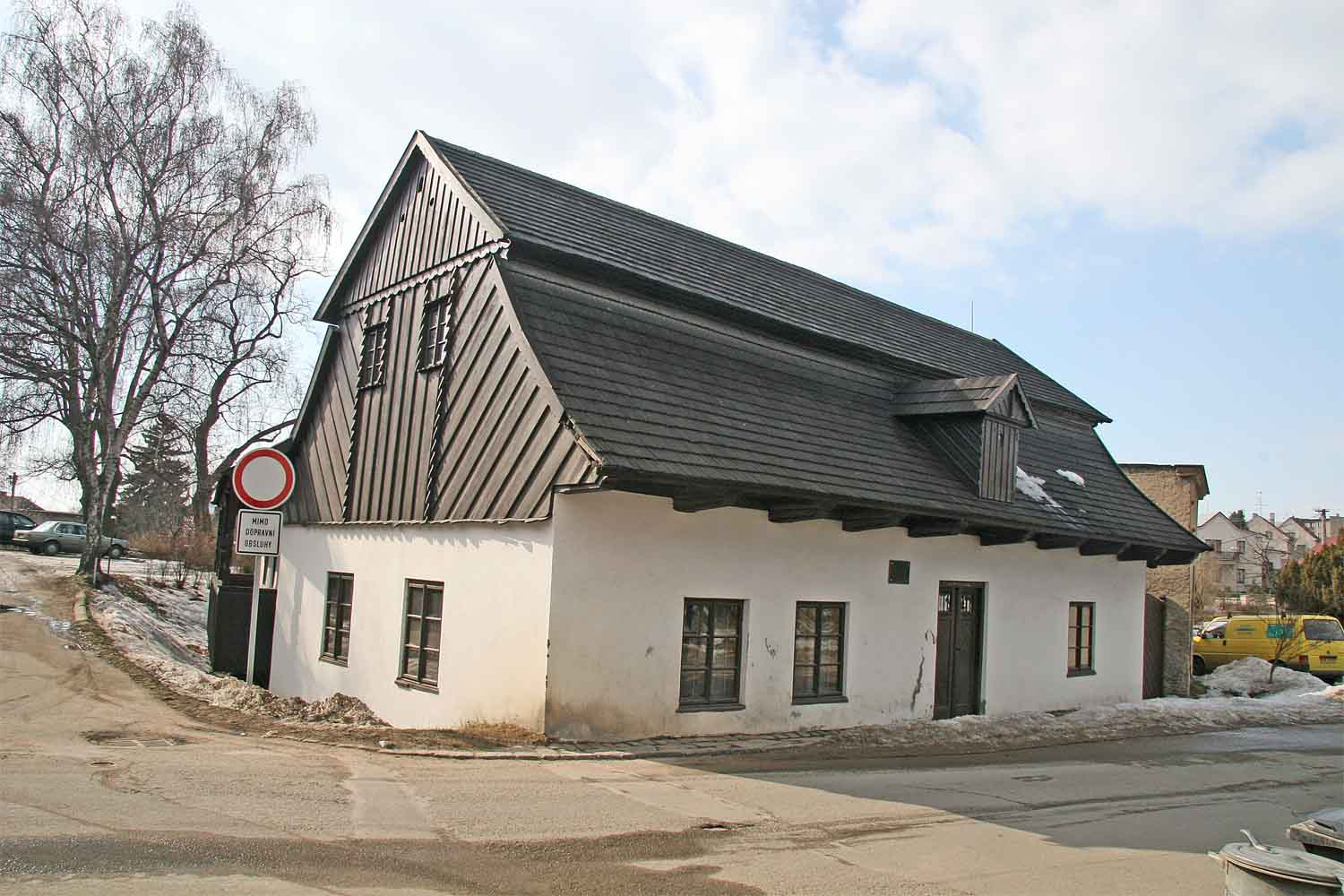
Birth house of Hek, now a museum

Hek was born on 11 April 1769 in Dobruška, Kingdom of Bohemia (present-day Czech Republic). He was the son of a shopkeeper (of Dutch origin).

Hek initially attended municipal school in Dobruška. In 1779, Hek moved to Prague and studied at Normal School and in 1782 began attending a Piarist gymnasium. In Prague, Hek met the Czech patriots concentrated around Václav Matěj Kramerius' publishing house Česká expedice and around the Czech theatre groups. In the second half of the 1780s, he returned to Dobruška to take over his father's shop. Hek also served as a local agent for Kramerius, loaned books from his large personal library (3,284 volumes in 1806) and tried to organize a local Czech theatre, which was forbidden by authorities.

A fire in 1806 completely destroyed his shop and he lost money during the state bankruptcy of the Austrian Empire in 1811. From 1806, he cooperated with Josef Liboslav Ziegler (1782–1846), a patriotic priest. In 1821, his wife died and he retired. Hek then lived, among other places, in the Saxonian town of Herrnhut (Czech: Ochranov), a centre of Czech Evangelical exile, and for the last years of his life in Kyšperk (today Letohrad) with his daughter. He died on 4 September 1847 in Kyšperk.

The historical novel F.L. Věk by Alois Jirásek is based on Hek's life, as described in his autobiography. A television series, F. L. Věk, was shot in 1971. The Town Museum of Dobruška owns Hek's birth house, and has hosted an exhibition about Hek in the building since 1972. Dobruška's main square was named after F.L. Věk.

== Work ==
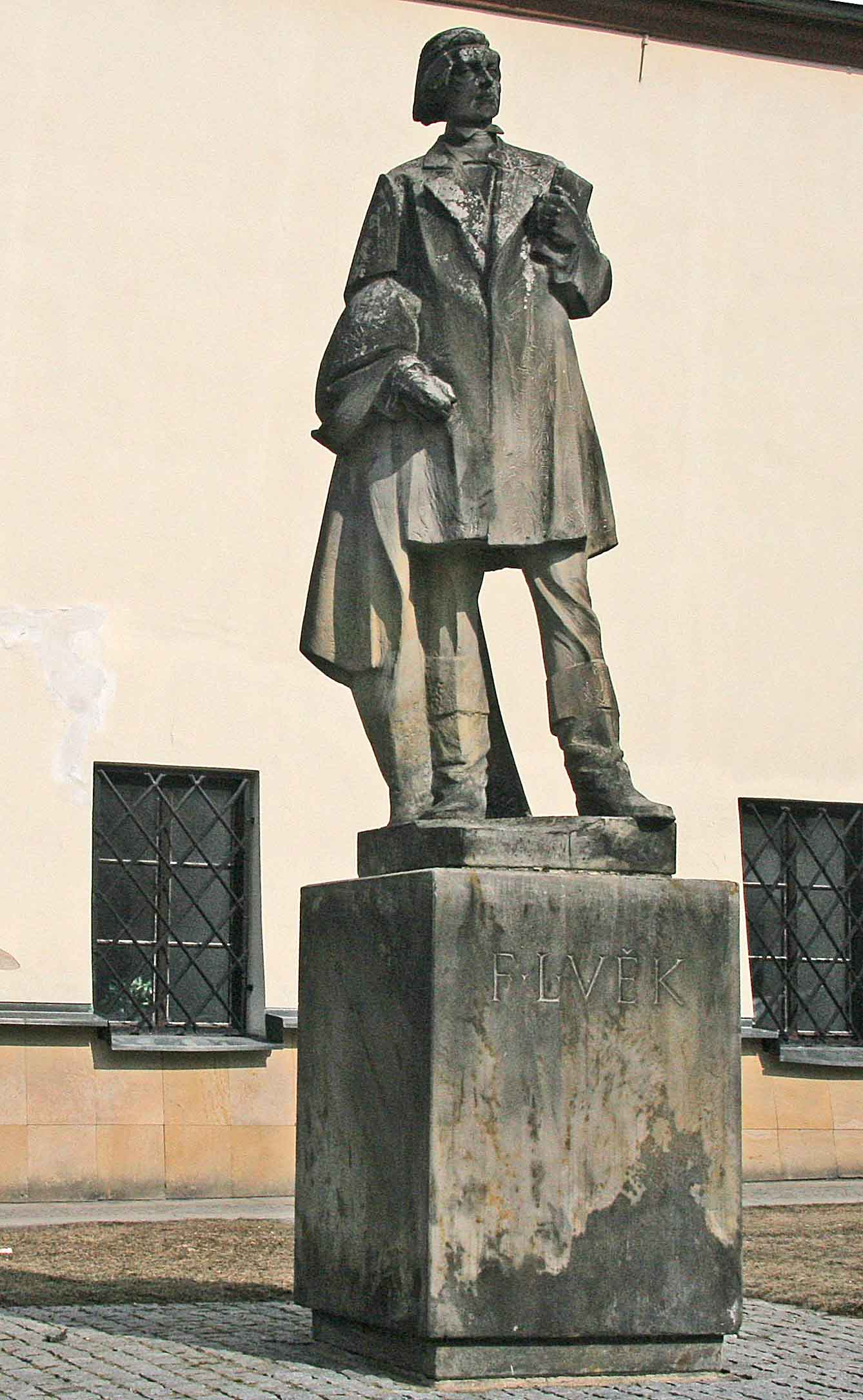
Statue of Hek in Dobruška

The majority of the Hek's works were published after 1806; the 1820s were his most active period. The most important were his satirical epigrams. In 1820, he published book of epigrams Velký pátek (English: Great Friday), a scathing critique of provincialism in Dobruška. An example of his epigrams is: "The greater the fool, the more titles he needs" (Czech: Čím větší vůl, tím více titulů). Predictably, the work was banned and confiscated, and only two original copies are known today. Hek was sentenced to three weeks in prison, though he was pardoned due to bad health, and was harassed by authorities in Dobruška ever thereafter. While living in Ochranov (Herrnhut), he translated old texts of Czech exiles into German. His best known music works were composed during the 1830–40s. Hek also wrote his own autobiography in German.

== Personal life ==
On 18 January 1792, Hek married Maria Anna (née Ježková; 1773–1821).

== Literature ==
- Jakubec, Jan (1929). Dějiny literatury české (in Czech). Vol. I.
- Jirásek, Alois (1888–1905). F. L. Věk (in Czech).
- Hladký, Ladislav (1972). F. Vl. Hek (F. L. Věk) (in Czech).
