= Ábrahámhegy =

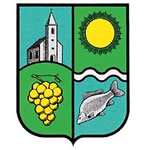
- Coat of arms

- Location of Veszprém county in Hungary

- Location of Ábrahámhegy
- Coordinates: 46.81628°N 17.56608°E
- Country: Hungary
- County: Veszprém

Area
  - Total: 14.88 km^{2} (5.75 sq mi)

Population (2017)
  - Total: 434
  - Density: 29.2/km^{2} (75.5/sq mi)
- Time zone: UTC+1 (CET)
  - Summer (DST): UTC+2 (CEST)
- Postal code: 8256
- Area code: 87

Ábrahámhegy is a village in Veszprém county, Hungary. It is located on the shore of Lake Balaton.
