= John Oliver Curran =

Irish physician (1819–1847)

John Oliver Curran MRIA
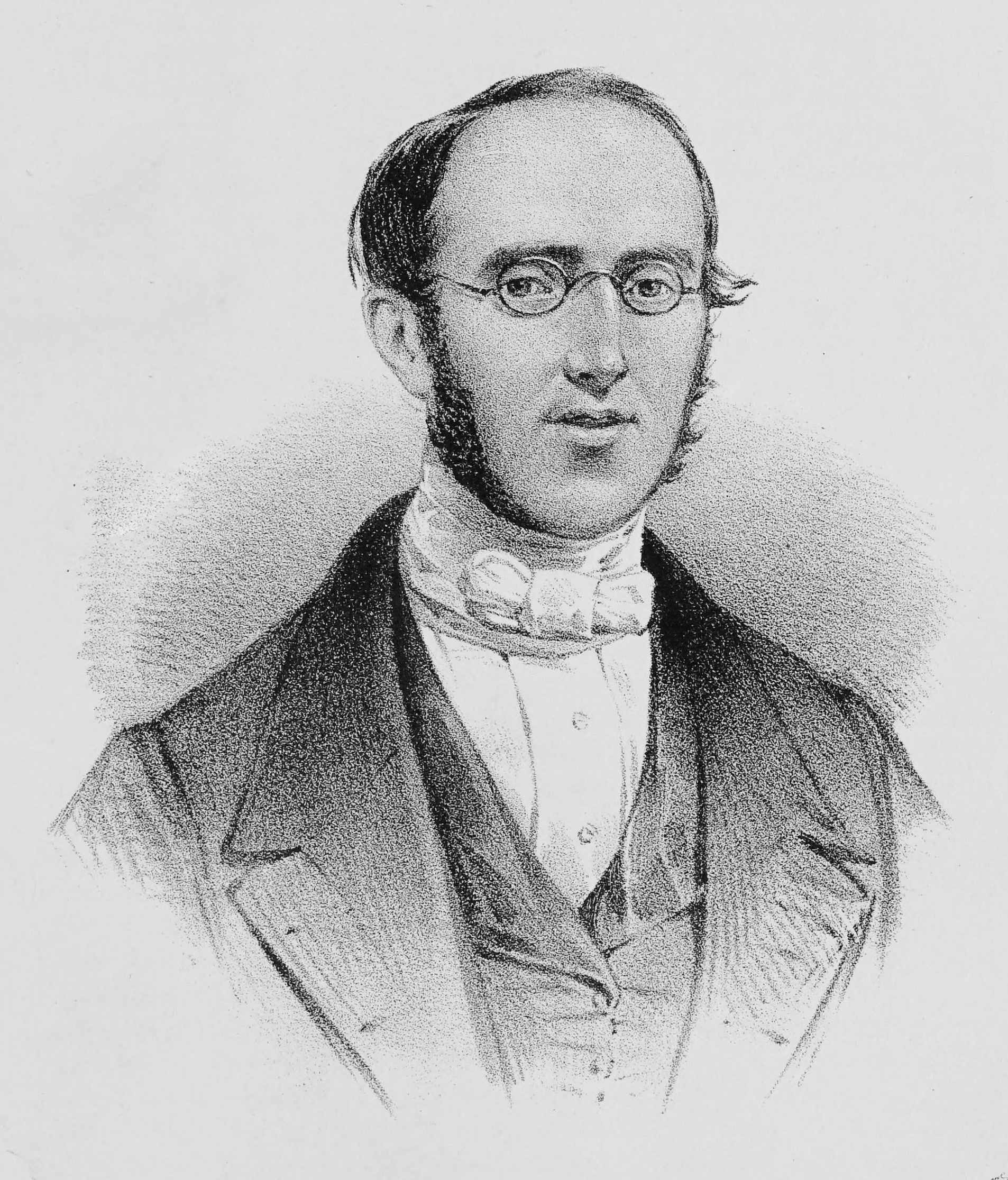
- Lithograph by James Henry Lynch, 1847
- Born: 30 April 1819; Trooperfield, County Down, Ireland
- Died: 26 September 1847 (aged 28); Dublin, Ireland
- Resting place: Mount Jerome Cemetery
- Education: University of Glasgow; Trinity College Dublin (M.B.)
- Medical career
- Profession: Physician
- Field: Medicine
- Institutions: Meath Hospital; Jervis Street Hospital; St Vincent's Hospital; Apothecaries' Hall School; Dublin General Dispensary

Signature
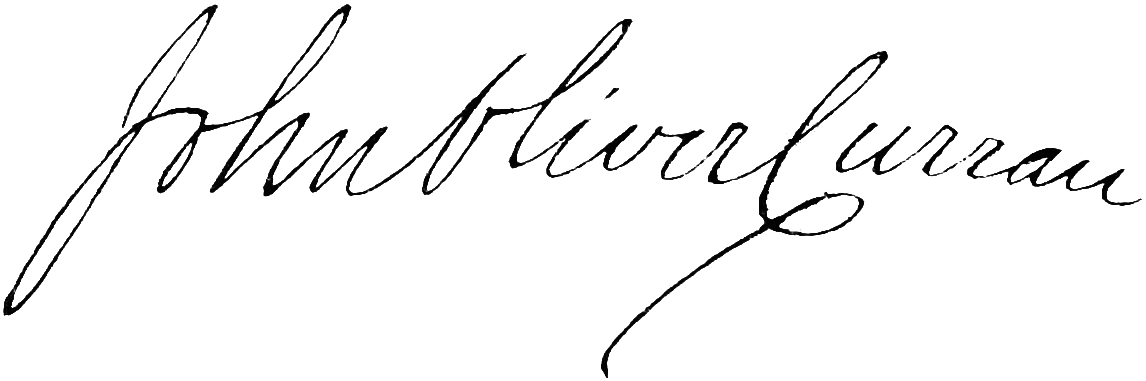

John Oliver Curran MRIA (30 April 1819 – 26 September 1847) was an Irish physician, medical writer and reviewer. He studied at the University of Glasgow and Trinity College Dublin, trained at the Meath Hospital, Jervis Street Hospital and St Vincent's Hospital, and later taught medicine at the Apothecaries' Hall School, Dublin. He was also a physician to the Dublin General Dispensary. He was a lifelong vegetarian, having abstained from meat from early childhood, and also avoided eggs, cheese, tea and coffee. During the 1847 fever epidemic in Dublin, he criticised conditions in fever hospitals. He died of typhus after nursing the French medical commissioner Henri Gueneau de Mussy.

== Early life and education ==
Curran was born on 30 April 1819 at Trooperfield, County Down, near Lisburn. He was the only son of Dr Joseph Curran. His family moved in 1824 to Douglas on the Isle of Man, where he first attended a mercantile school and later a classical seminary.

Curran entered the University of Glasgow in 1833. He studied mathematics, logic and classics, and later attended medical lectures. He competed for prizes in Greek and Latin, and later in logic and moral philosophy. In 1838 he entered Trinity College Dublin, where he studied arts and medicine. He also trained at the Meath Hospital under Robert James Graves and William Stokes. In 1842 he won stethoscopic and clinical prizes at the hospital, as well as the Dr Stokes prize for the practice of physic at the Park Street School of Medicine.

In 1843 Curran became an intern pupil at Jervis Street Hospital and later served as clinical clerk to Dominic Corrigan O'Ferrall at St Vincent's Hospital. He graduated M.B. in 1843. He then studied in Paris in 1843–1844 before returning to Dublin. He was admitted as a licentiate of the King and Queen's College of Physicians in Ireland in 1846.

== Medical work and writing ==
After a further visit to Paris, where he toured psychiatric hospitals, Curran wrote a report that was used in a parliamentary report on lunacy. William Wilde stated that Curran's 1846 tour also took him to the Netherlands and Belgium, where he visited hospitals, scientific institutions and scholars. He became a corresponding member of several foreign medical societies and wrote papers and reviews for medical journals.

Curran contributed regularly to the Dublin Quarterly Journal of Medical Science after it took that title, and also wrote for the Dublin University Magazine. His article "Homeopathy and homeopathic writings" appeared in the same journal in February 1846. According to Wilde, Curran also supervised the publication of the Pathological Reports and wrote the Medical Periscope that appeared in August 1846. His article on scurvy appeared in the Dublin Quarterly Journal of Medical Science shortly before his final illness.

Curran was a member of the council and chemistry committee of the Royal Dublin Society, served as secretary to the council of the Dublin Pathological Society in 1846, and edited reports of the society's proceedings for the Dublin Quarterly Journal of Medical Science. He was elected a member of the Royal Irish Academy in 1846. In the same year, he was elected professor of the practice of medicine at the Apothecaries' Hall School, one of the physicians to the Dublin General Dispensary, and secretary to the council of the Pathological Society.

== Vegetarianism ==
In 1845, in the Dublin Journal of Medical Science, Curran reviewed John Smith's Fruits and Farinacea: The Proper Food of Man. Wilde described this as Curran's first review and said that Curran added an account of his own diet at the editor's request.

In that account, Curran stated that he had abstained from meat since the age of four, after being teased for petting lambs and rabbits and then eating their flesh. He also stated that he did not eat eggs or cheese and did not use tea or coffee. Wilde wrote that Curran's ordinary diet consisted of milk, fruit and farinacea, and that he had taken wine or malt liquor only once, during an attack of typhus fever in 1840.

== Fever epidemic and death ==
In 1847 Curran was appointed to the staff of a temporary fever hospital established by the newly created Central Board of Health during the fever epidemic in Dublin. After learning that the post was paid at five shillings a day, he resigned with the support of colleagues, who regarded the stipend as an insult to the medical profession. Wilde wrote that Curran first consulted other physicians, that a wider meeting of the profession was proposed, and that he resigned after the meeting was not held.

Curran had also worked without pay among poor patients as a physician to the Dublin General Dispensary from 1846. Later in 1847 he accompanied his friend Henri Gueneau de Mussy, a French medical commissioner, on a tour of Dublin fever hospitals. De Mussy had been sent by the French government, with a colleague named Rodier, to study the management and character of fever in Dublin. Curran described the conditions he saw in letters published in the Freeman's Journal and Saunders's News-Letter on 24 August 1847. The Dictionary of Irish Biography states that the letters helped prompt discussion and further action by the Board of Health and the relief commissioners. Wilde wrote that the letters followed a visit to fever localities and hospitals with de Mussy, and that they drew public attention to the condition of Dublin's fever-stricken population.

De Mussy contracted a severe case of typhus, and Curran nursed him during the illness. Curran then contracted the disease himself and died at 9 o'clock on the morning of 26 September 1847 at his home in Waterloo Road, Dublin. He was aged 28. He was buried at Mount Jerome Cemetery.

After his death, James Henry Lynch produced a lithograph of Curran from a drawing by an artist named Ford, with assistance from a daguerreotype and a cast.
