= A. W. Faber Model 366 =

Unusual slide rule using a system similar to discrete logarithms

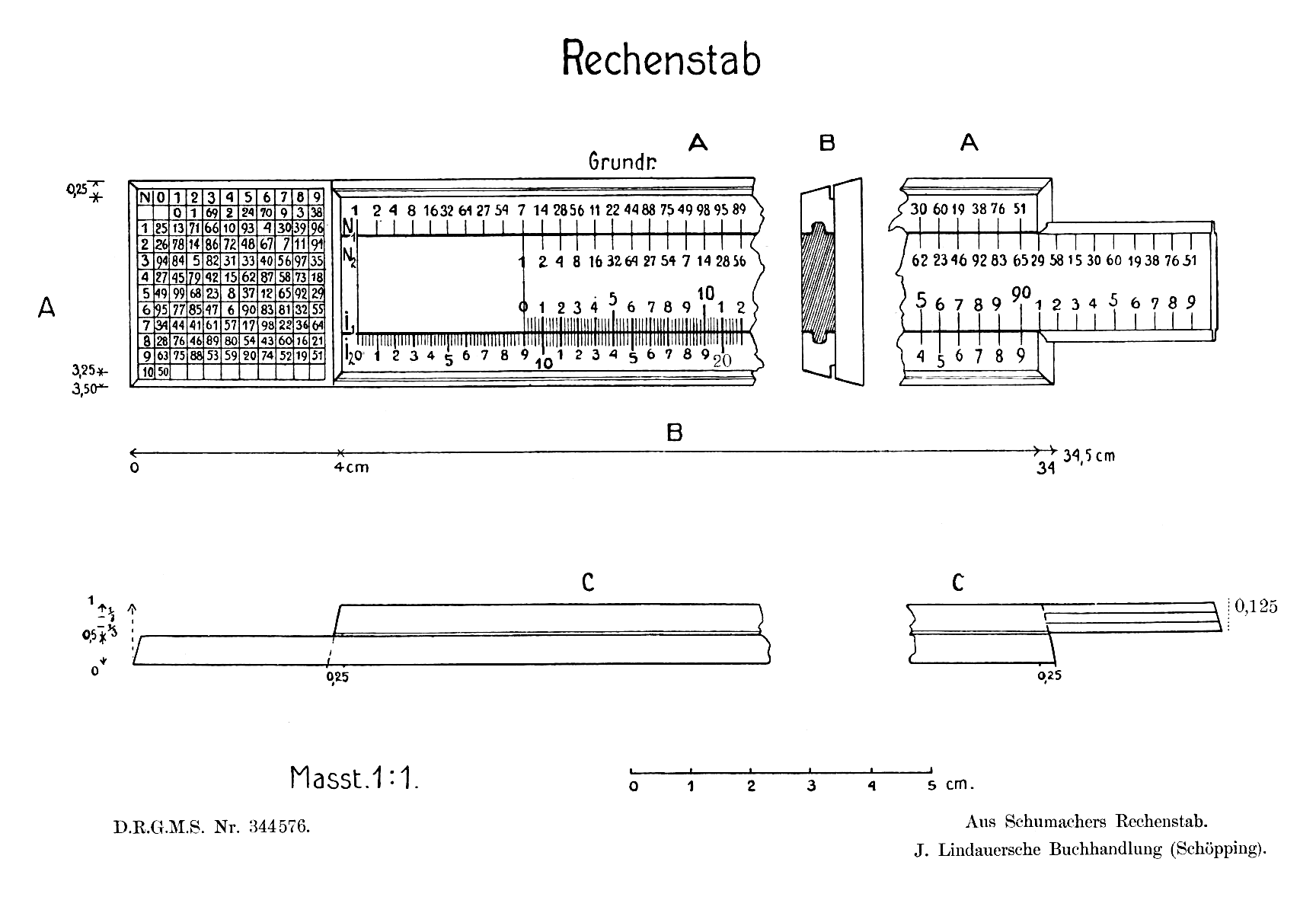
Schumacher's original design, from which the Model 366 slide rule deviates only slightly

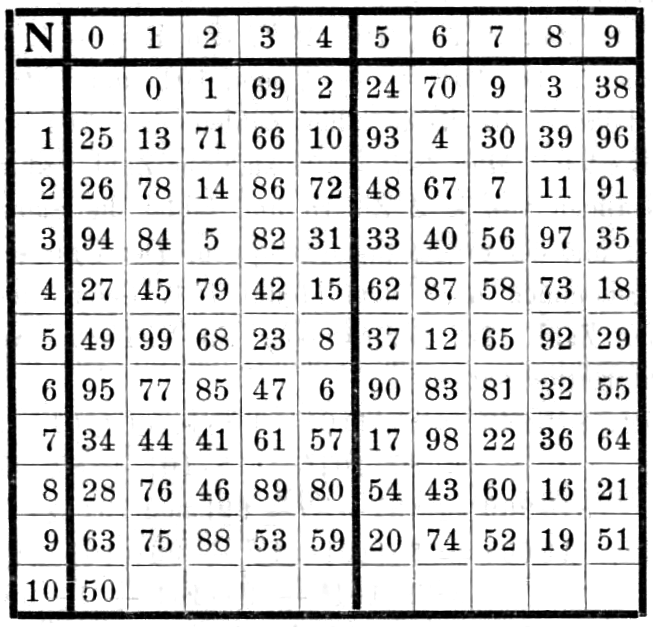
Number table depicted on the slide rule

The A. W. Faber Model 366 was an unusual model of slide rule, manufactured in Germany by the A. W. Faber Company around 1909, with scales that followed a system invented by Johannes Schumacher (1858–1930) that used discrete logarithms to calculate products of integers without approximation.

The Model 366 is notable for its table of numbers, mapping the numbers 1 to 100 to a permutation of the numbers 0 to 99 in a pattern based on discrete logarithms. The markings on the table are:

N	0	1	2	3	4	5	6	7	8	9
		0	1	69	2	24	70	9	3	38
1	25	13	71	66	10	93	4	30	39	96
2	26	78	14	86	72	48	67	7	11	91
3	94	84	5	82	31	33	40	56	97	35
4	27	45	79	42	15	62	87	58	73	18
5	49	99	68	23	8	37	12	65	92	29
6	95	77	85	47	6	90	83	81	32	55
7	34	44	41	61	57	17	98	22	36	64
8	28	76	46	89	80	54	43	60	16	21
9	63	75	88	53	59	20	74	52	19	51
10	50

The slide rule has two scales on each side of the upper edge of the slider marked with the integers 1 to 100 in a different permuted order, evenly spaced apart. The ordering of the numbers on these scales is

1, 2, 4, 8, 16, 32, 64, 27, 54, 7, 14, 28, 56, 11, 22, 44, 88, 75, 49, 98, 95, 89, 77, 53, 5, 10, 20, 40, 80, 59, 17, 34, 68, 35, 70, 39, 78, 55, 9, 18, 36, 72, 43, 86, 71, 41, 82, 63, 25, 50, 100, 99, 97, 93, 85, 69, 37, 74, 47, 94, 87, 73, 45, 90, 79, 57, 13, 26, 52, 3, 6, 12, 24, 48, 96, 91, 81, 61, 21, 42, 84, 67, 33, 66, 31, 62, 23, 46, 92, 83, 65, 29, 58, 15, 30, 60, 19, 38, 76, 51

which corresponds to the inverse permutation to the one given by the number table.

There are also two scales on each side of the lower edge of the slider, consisting of the integers 0 to 100 similarly spaced, but in ascending order, with the zero on the lower scales lining up with the 1 on the upper scales.

Schumacher's indices are an example of Jacobi indices, generated with p = 101 and g = 2. Schumacher's system of indices correctly generates the desired products, but is not unique: several other similar systems have been created by others, including systems by Ludgate, Remak and Korn.

An elaborate system of rules had to be used to compute products of numbers larger than 101.

Very few of the Model 366 slide rules remain, with only five known to have survived.

== See also ==
- Irish logarithms, a similar scheme intended for use in a mechanical calculation machine, introduced in 1909 by Percy Ludgate
- Canon arithmeticus, a table of indices and powers with respect to primitive roots originally published by Carl Gustav Jacob Jacobi
