= Irish logarithm =

Method of multiplying small numbers using lookup tables

The Irish logarithm was a system of number manipulation invented by Percy Ludgate for machine multiplication. The system used a combination of mechanical cams as lookup tables and mechanical addition to sum pseudo-logarithmic indices to produce partial products, which were then added to produce results.

The technique is similar to Zech logarithms (also known as Jacobi logarithms), but uses a system of indices original to Ludgate.

== Concept ==
Ludgate's algorithm compresses the multiplication of two single decimal numbers into two table lookups (to convert the digits into indices), the addition of the two indices to create a new index which is input to a second lookup table that generates the output product. Because both lookup tables are one-dimensional, and the addition of linear movements is simple to implement mechanically, this allows a less complex mechanism than would be needed to implement a two-dimensional 10×10 multiplication lookup table.

Ludgate stated that he deliberately chose the values in his tables to be as small as he could make them; given this, Ludgate's tables can be simply constructed from first principles, either via pen-and-paper methods, or a systematic search using only a few tens of lines of program code. They do not correspond to either Zech logarithms, Remak indexes or Korn indexes.

== Pseudocode ==
The following is an implementation of Ludgate's Irish logarithm algorithm in the Python programming language:

table1 = [50, 0, 1, 7, 2, 23, 8, 33, 3, 14]

table2 = [ 1,  2,  4,  8, 16, 32, 64,  3,  6, 12, 
          24, 48,  0,  0,  9, 18, 36, 72,  0,  0, 
           0, 27, 54,  5, 10, 20, 40,  0, 81,  0, 
          15, 30,  0,  7, 14, 28, 56, 45,  0,  0, 
          21, 42,  0,  0,  0,  0, 25, 63,  0,  0, 
           0,  0,  0,  0,  0,  0, 35,  0,  0,  0, 
           0,  0,  0,  0,  0,  0, 49,  0,  0,  0, 
           0,  0,  0,  0,  0,  0,  0,  0,  0,  0,
           0,  0,  0,  0,  0,  0,  0,  0,  0,  0, 
           0,  0,  0,  0,  0,  0,  0,  0,  0,  0, 
           0]

def product(a: int, b: int) -> int:
    """Ludgate's Irish logarithm algorithm."""
    return table2[table1[a] + table1[b]]

Table 1 is taken from Ludgate's original paper; given the first table, the contents of Table 2 can be trivially derived from Table 1 and the definition of the algorithm. Note since that the last third of the second table is entirely zeros, this could be exploited to further simplify a mechanical implementation of the algorithm.

== See also ==
- Faber-Castell Model 366 – Unusual slide rule using a system similar to discrete logarithms
- Canon arithmeticus – 1839 mathematical tables by Carl Jacobi
