= Fruits and Farinacea =

1845 treatise by John Smith

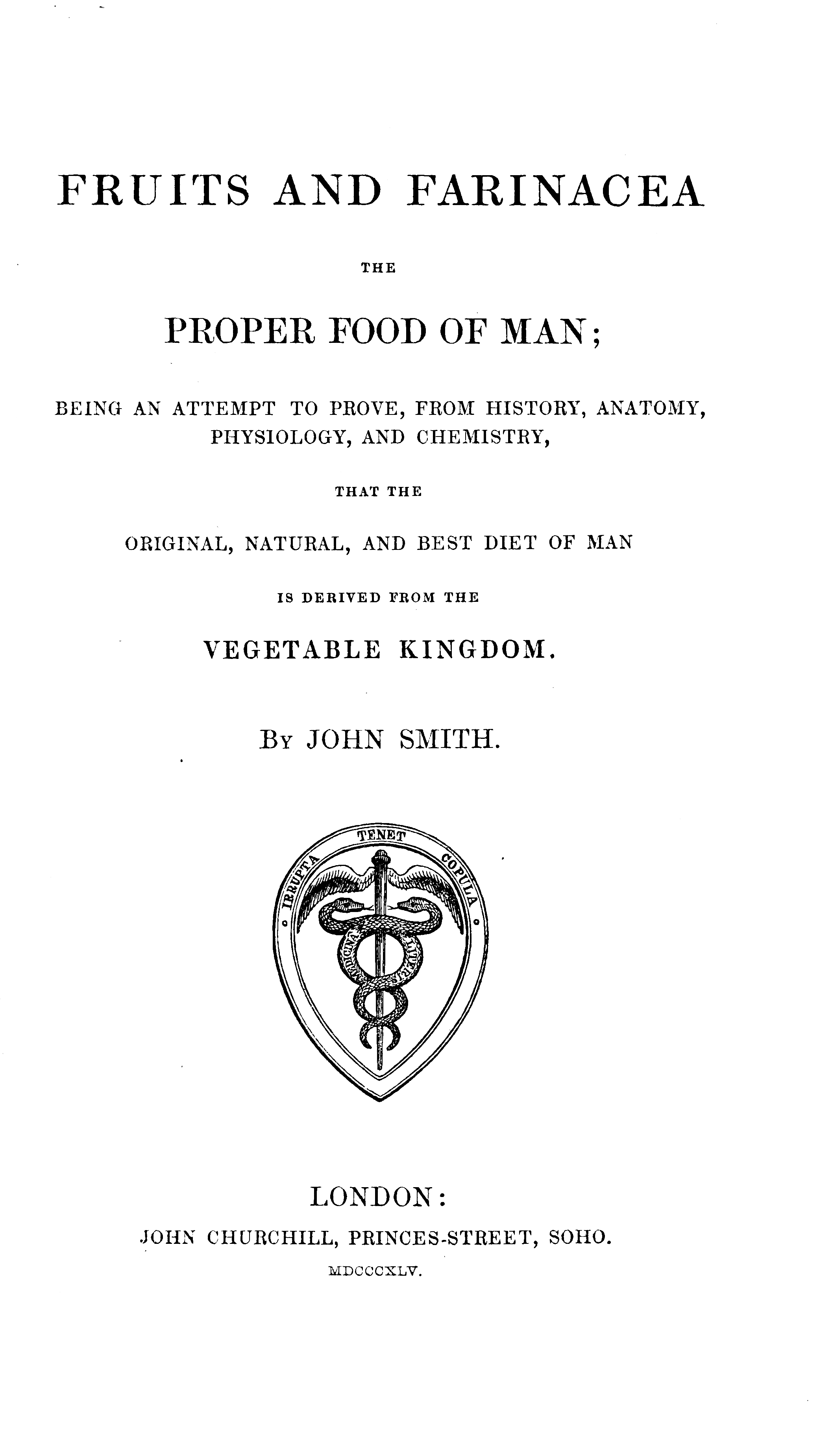
- First edition title page
- Author: John Smith
- Language: English
- Subject: Vegetarianism
- Genre: Treatise
- Publisher: John Churchill
- Publication date: 1845
- Publication place: United Kingdom of Great Britain and Ireland
- Media type: Print (hardcover)
- Pages: 314
- OCLC: 610348355
- Text: Fruits and Farinacea at the Internet Archive

Fruits and Farinacea: The Proper Food of Man (Note: Full title: Fruits and Farinacea: The Proper Food of Man, Being an Attempt to Prove, from History, Anatomy, Physiology, and Chemistry, that the Original, Natural, and Best Diet of Man is Derived from the Vegetable Kingdom.) is an 1845 treatise by the English banker and vegetarianism activist John Smith. Published by John Churchill, the book argues for a vegetarian diet using anatomical, physiological, chemical, historical, and biblical evidence. Smith maintained that humans were naturally suited to fruits, grains, and other plant foods, and that the consumption of animal products contributed to disease and moral decline.

The book was reviewed in medical and popular journals, receiving both favourable and critical responses. It was reissued in the United States with notes by Russell Thacher Trall, and later appeared in abridged and revised editions edited by Francis William Newman and Charles W. Forward. Forward later described it as the most complete English work on vegetarianism published up to that date, while historian James Gregory has described it as a major text in the development of the British vegetarian movement.

== Background ==
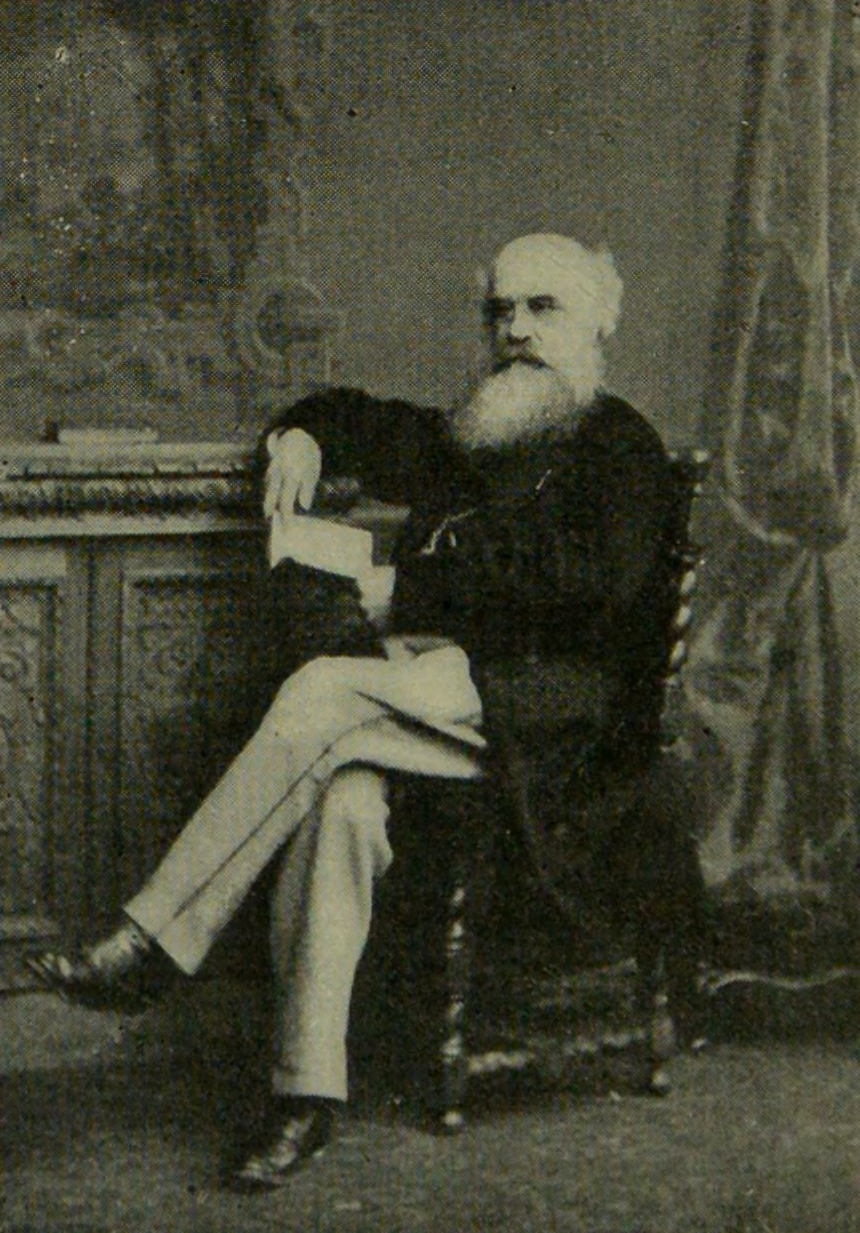
John Smith (c. 1795–1870)

John Smith (c. 1795–1870) was an English banker, spiritualist, and vegetarianism activist based in Malton.

Smith became vegetarian around 1835. According to historian James Gregory, he was led to vegetarianism after reading a paper on "Manifestation of Mind", (Note: The paper, Lewis H. Morgan's "Mind or Instinct: An Inquiry Concerning the Manifestation of Mind by the Lower Orders of Animals", was published in The Knickerbocker in December 1843, several years after Smith is said to have adopted the diet, creating a chronological inconsistency.) which drew his attention to mental similarities between humans and animals, including their shared capacity for pleasure and pain.

== Publication history ==
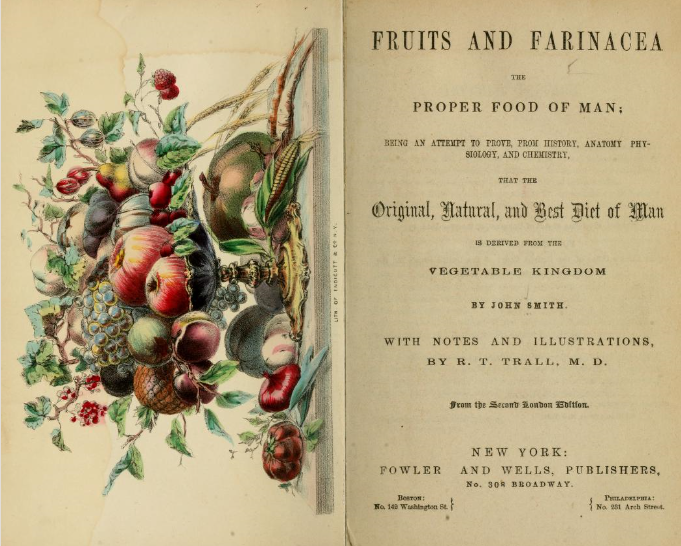
Title page of Russell Thacher Trall's second edition of Fruits and Farinacea (1854)

Fruits and Farinacea was first published by John Churchill in 1845, with a dedication to the vegetarianism activist Dr. William Lambe. An American second edition was published in 1854 with notes and illustrations by Russell Thacher Trall. A condensed version was published in 1873, edited by Francis William Newman for the Vegetarian Society. In 1897, a further edition was edited by Charles W. Forward, who included additional commentary and revisions.

== Summary ==
Smith cited anatomy, chemistry, history, and physiology to argue that the natural human diet was vegetarian. He cited the Bible as evidence that fruits and starchy plant foods such as grains, pulses, and root vegetables, were the original foods of the Garden of Eden before the fall of man. Smith also discussed ancient peoples mentioned in the Bible and early nations that he described as living on vegetarian diets.

Smith argued from the shape and size of human teeth, the structure of the jaw, the length of the alimentary canal, and other anatomical evidence that humans were not naturally carnivorous or omnivorous. He stated that a vegetarian diet was sufficient to maintain physical activity and strength, and that extremes of temperature and warm climates were better endured on a vegetarian diet than on a meat-based diet. He argued that animal-derived food was the main cause of severe disease and that regular use of animal food caused gout, rheumatism, and other disorders. Smith maintained that a vegetarian diet was more pleasurable, favourable to mental vigour and moral faculties, and best suited to health and longevity.

== Reception ==
Fruits and Farinacea was reviewed in the mainstream press, aided by its publication through the medical publisher John Churchill. Early reviews of the book included favourable responses, while later medical reviews criticised its use of historical sources and its physiological arguments.

The Provincial Medical and Surgical Journal reviewed the book positively in 1845, describing it as a "curious and interesting work". The Edinburgh Medical and Surgical Journal published a 14-page review that was sympathetic to Smith's criticism of excessive meat consumption but recommended a mixed diet as the most suitable.

In 1846, The Medico-Chirurgical Review commented:

In conclusion, we may express the opinion that Mr. Smith has stated his case ably but not successfully; he has said enough in favour of an exclusively vegetable diet to show that it offers all the requisites for human sustenance, when fancy, ill-health, or any particular circumstance, may induce its adoption; but no sufficient arguments or experience have been advanced to lead us to believe that any advantage would arise from its substitution in place of the ordinary mixed regimen.

A reviewer in the Monthly Journal of Medical Science in 1849 objected that many of the examples Smith cited of individuals and communities living on a vegetable diet were not strictly vegetarian, since they also consumed milk. Smith's book appeared to argue for an ovo-lacto vegetarian diet, but this was not specified. The reviewer argued that this also conflicted with Smith's statement that "vegetables contain all the elements and qualities necessary for the complete nutrition of man." The reviewer agreed with Smith that many people ate too much meat, but considered the book too extreme in arguing for the total exclusion of meat.

The New York Medical Gazette and Journal of Health praised Smith's writing and described the book as "the best book on the subject, and immeasurably superior to any which have been written here in this department." The reviewer criticised Russell Trall's added notes as promotional material for other publications. A reviewer in the New Hampshire Journal of Medicine in 1854 was unconvinced by Smith's arguments against meat and also criticised Trall's notes as promotional.

A review in the Chemical News and Journal of Industrial Science in 1874 commented that Smith's "arguments and proofs are in the main so unsatisfactory, that we are more inclined than ever to be omnivorous". The Quarterly Journal of Science concluded that "we have been unable to find a trace of sound logic or convincing argument in the whole book, and are more than ever assured that our omnivorous diet is the right one."

In 1897, The British Medical Journal criticised the book as non-scientific. The review stated that Smith relied on obsolete historical sources and described his religious arguments as "fanciful". It also criticised physiological errors, including Smith's claim that the pancreas secretes nitrogen when dietary intake is lacking.

== Legacy ==
In 1860, Smith published The Principles and Practice of Vegetarian Cookery, an ovo-lacto vegetarian cookbook, at the request of James Simpson, to whom it was dedicated.

Scottish vegetarian activist John Davie was partly influenced by Fruits and Farinacea to become a vegetarian.

In his 1898 history of the vegetarian movement, Fifty Years of Food Reform, Charles W. Forward described Fruits and Farinacea as "the most comprehensive and complete work on the subject published in England up to that date". Modern historian James Gregory has described the book as a "major text" in the development of the vegetarian movement.

== See also ==
- Bibliography of veganism and vegetarianism
- History of vegetarianism
- Vegetarianism in the Victorian era
