= Swiss Cottage, Cahir =

Historic cottage in Ireland

Coordinates: 52.3574°N 7.9235°W

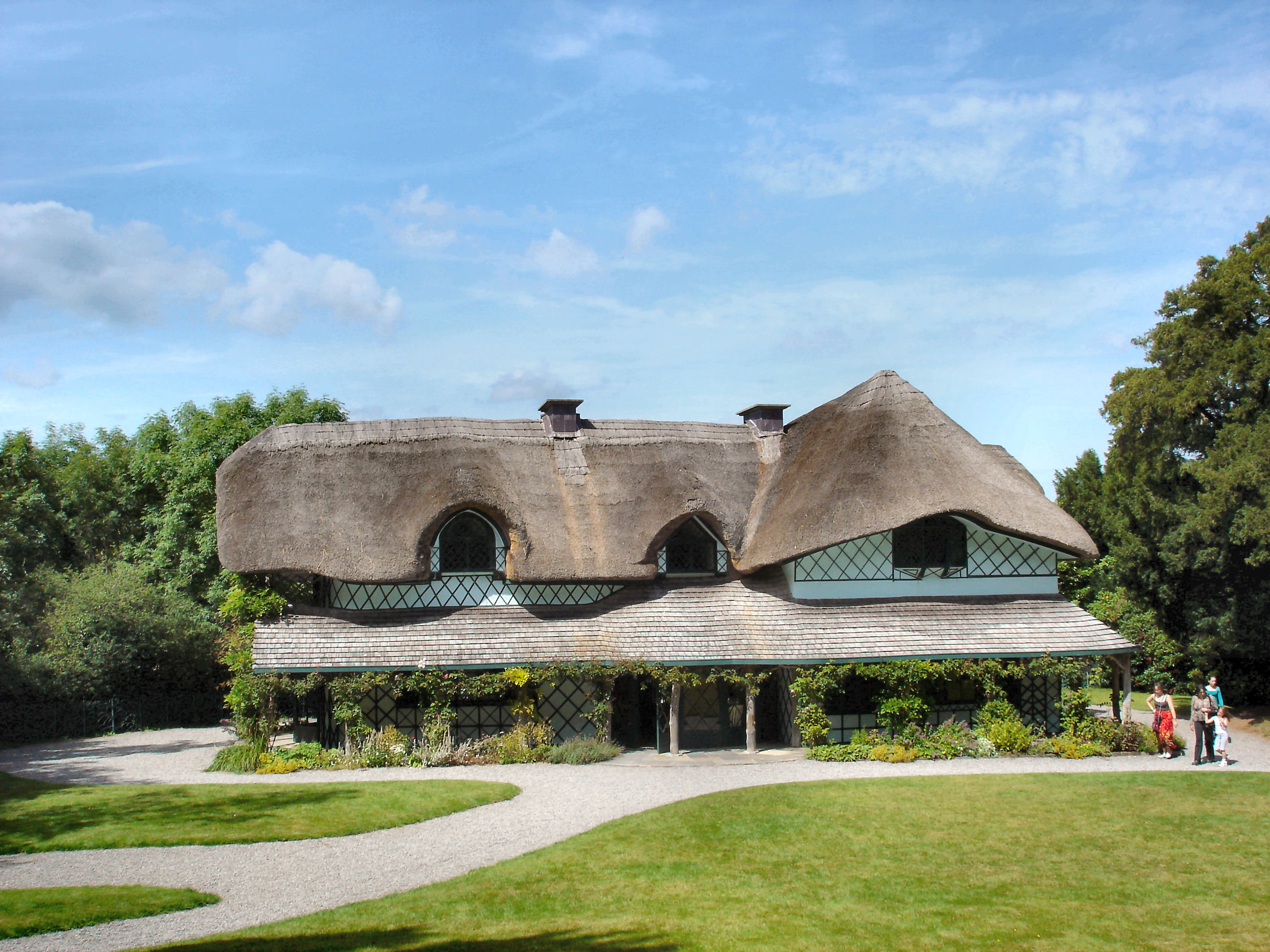
The Swiss Cottage, Cahir

The Swiss Cottage is an early 19th-century cottage orné (ornamental cottage) located at Kilcommon near the town of Cahir, County Tipperary in Ireland. It is managed by the Office of Public Works and open to the public as a tourist attraction.

== History ==
The Swiss cottage was built around 1810 and is a noted example of a cottage orné, or ornamental cottage. Its design is attributed to the English Regency architect John Nash, who also designed a number of other buildings in Cahir.

Originally part of the estate of Lord and Lady Cahir, the "fantasy" cottage was used for entertaining guests. The then estate owner and Lord Cahir (later Viscount Cahir) was Richard Butler, 1st Earl of Glengall and 10th Baron Cahir (1775–1819), who married Emily Jeffereys from Blarney Castle in 1793.

After some years of neglect, restoration of the cottage started in 1985. The restoration was overseen by a partnership of the Irish Georgian Society, the Port Royal Foundation and Sybil Connolly. The Swiss cottage opened to the public as a historic house museum in 1989.

== Architecture and interior ==
Laid out in a T-shaped plan, the cottage has three bays to the front, timber-work verandas on several sides, and an ornate thatched roof. Its interior includes a parquet floor and timber spiral staircase, with some rooms containing original wallpapers attributed to Joseph Dufour and company; reputedly among "the first commercially produced Parisian wallpaper".

== Similar buildings ==
Similar buildings exist elsewhere in Ireland at Burrenwood (County Down), Derrymore (County Armagh), and Glengarriff (County Cork). As with the earlier Petit hameau de la Reine at Versailles in France, these picturesque cottages were popular with gentry in the early 19th century as places to "play at being peasants" and to entertain guests.

Milady Cahir is referred to by Napoleon's Josephine in connection with the Château de Malmaison.

== Gallery ==
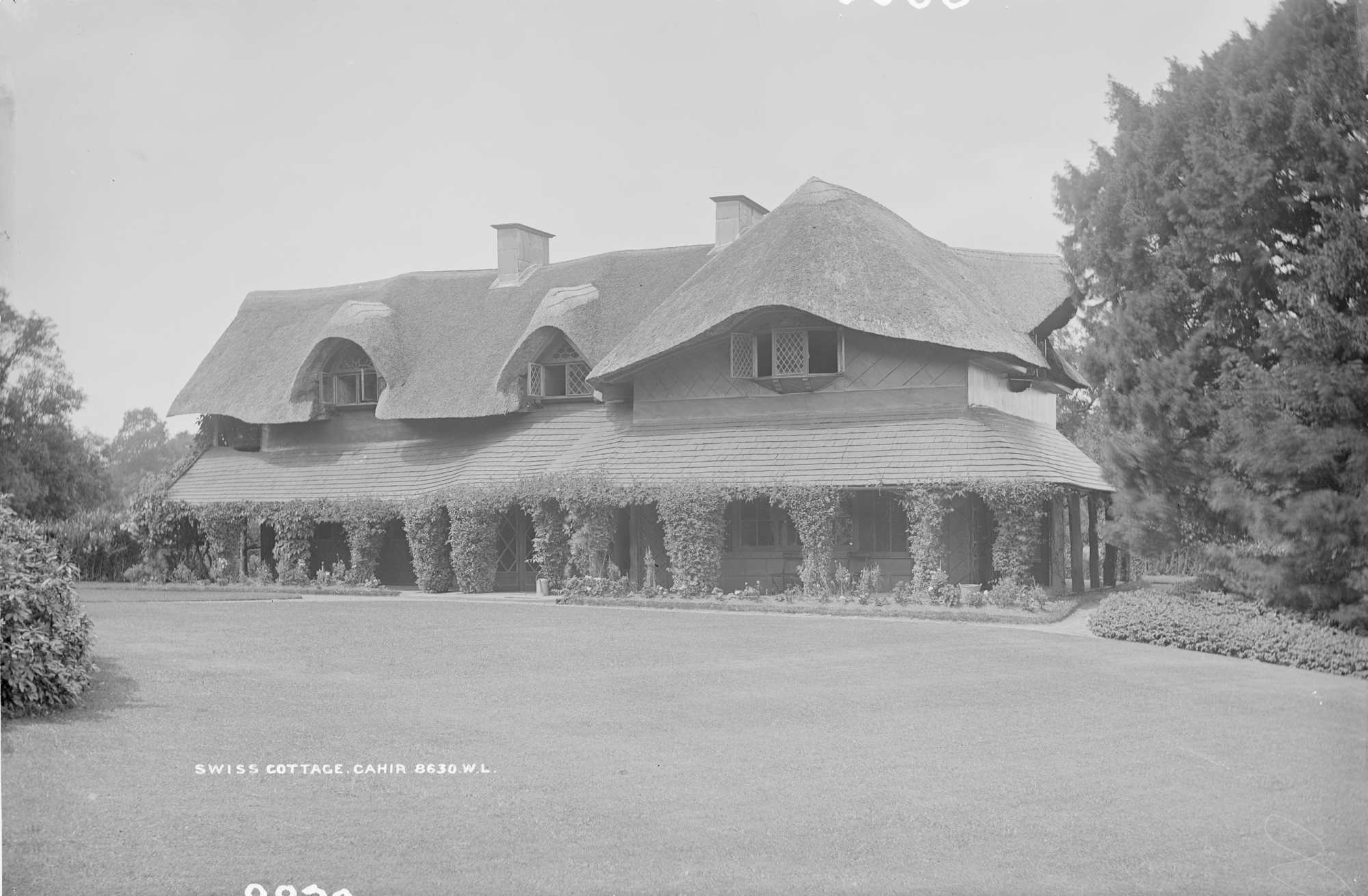
Photograph of the Swiss Cottage by Robert French

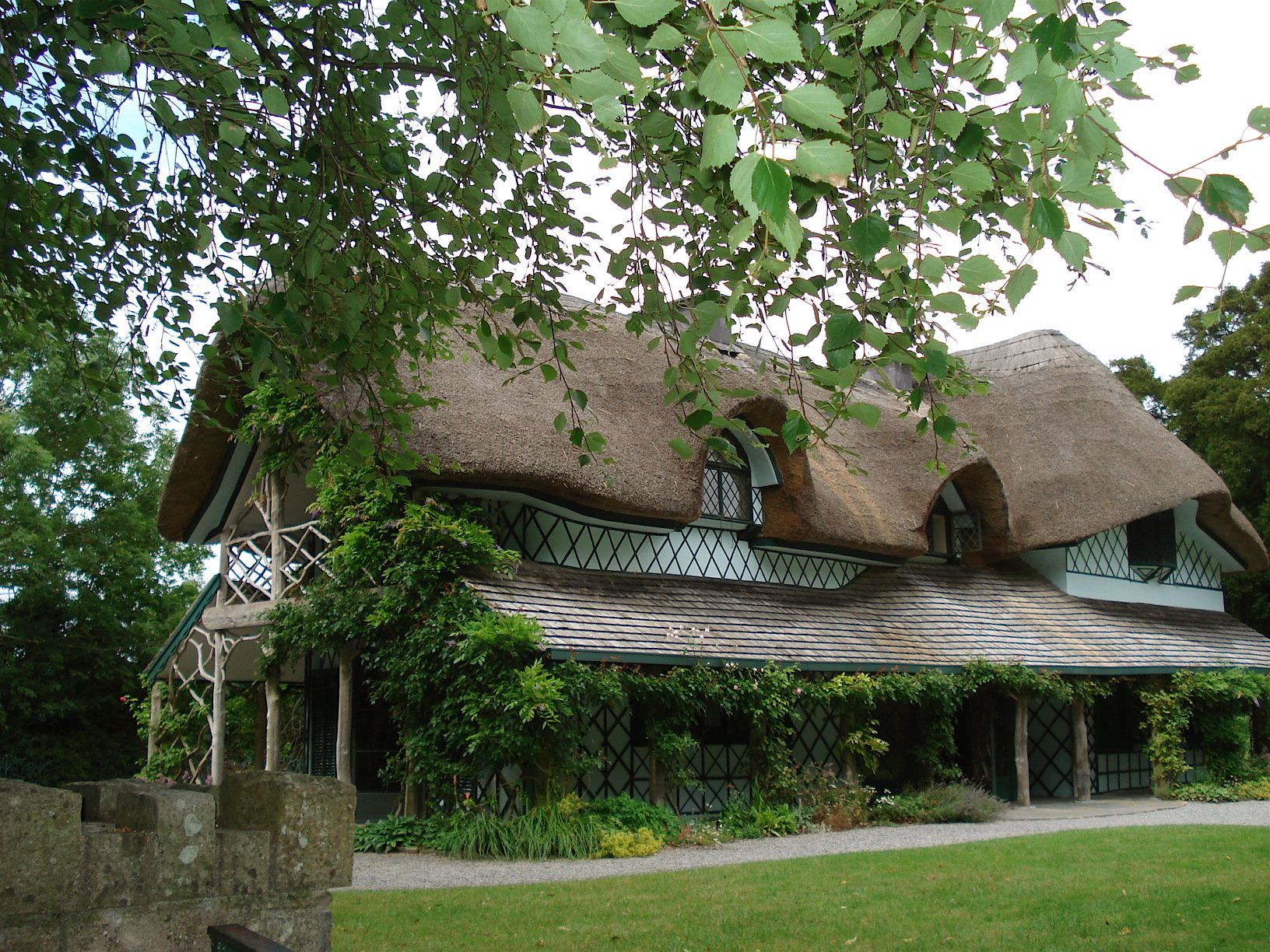
Swiss Cottage

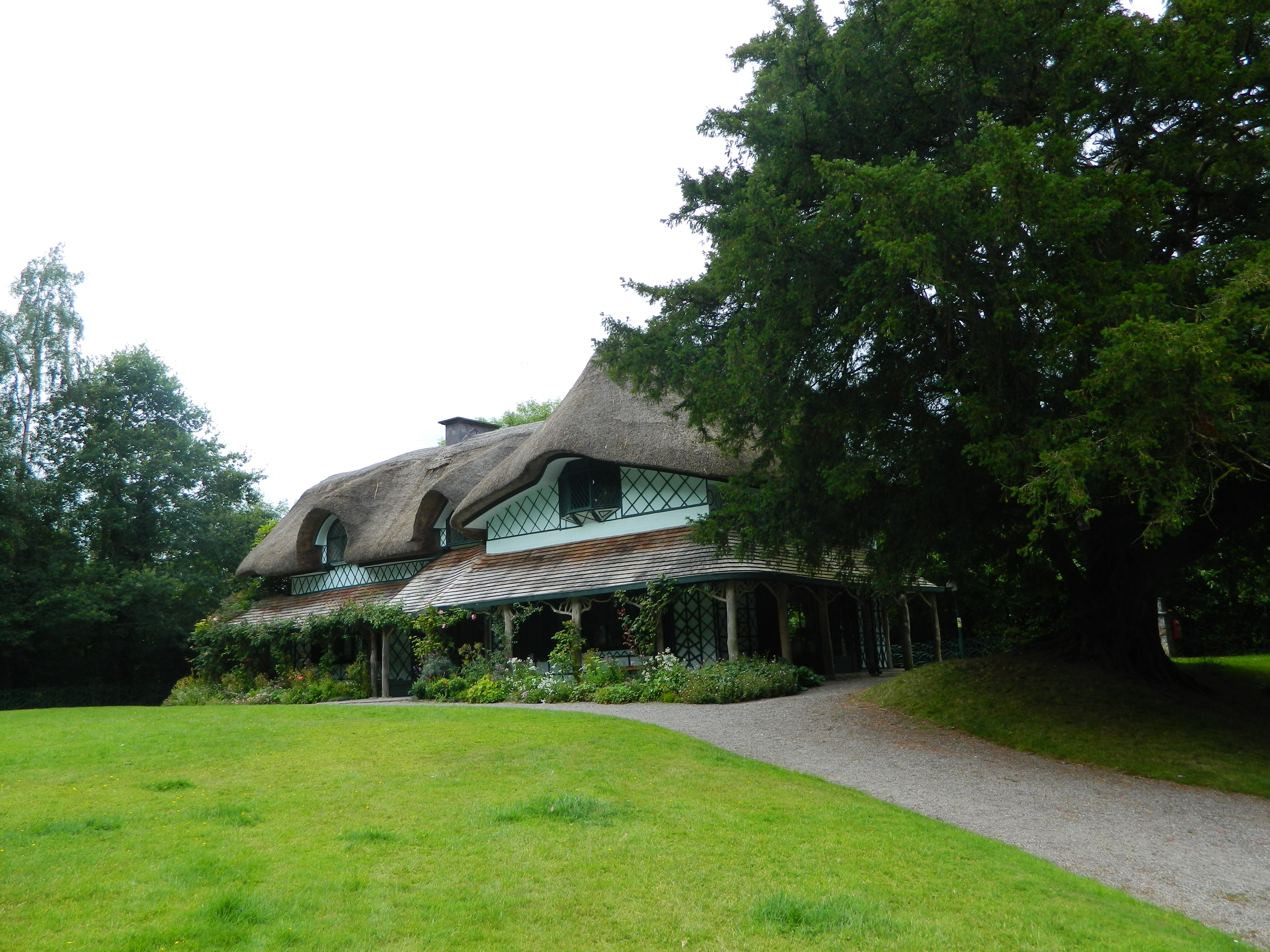
Pathway

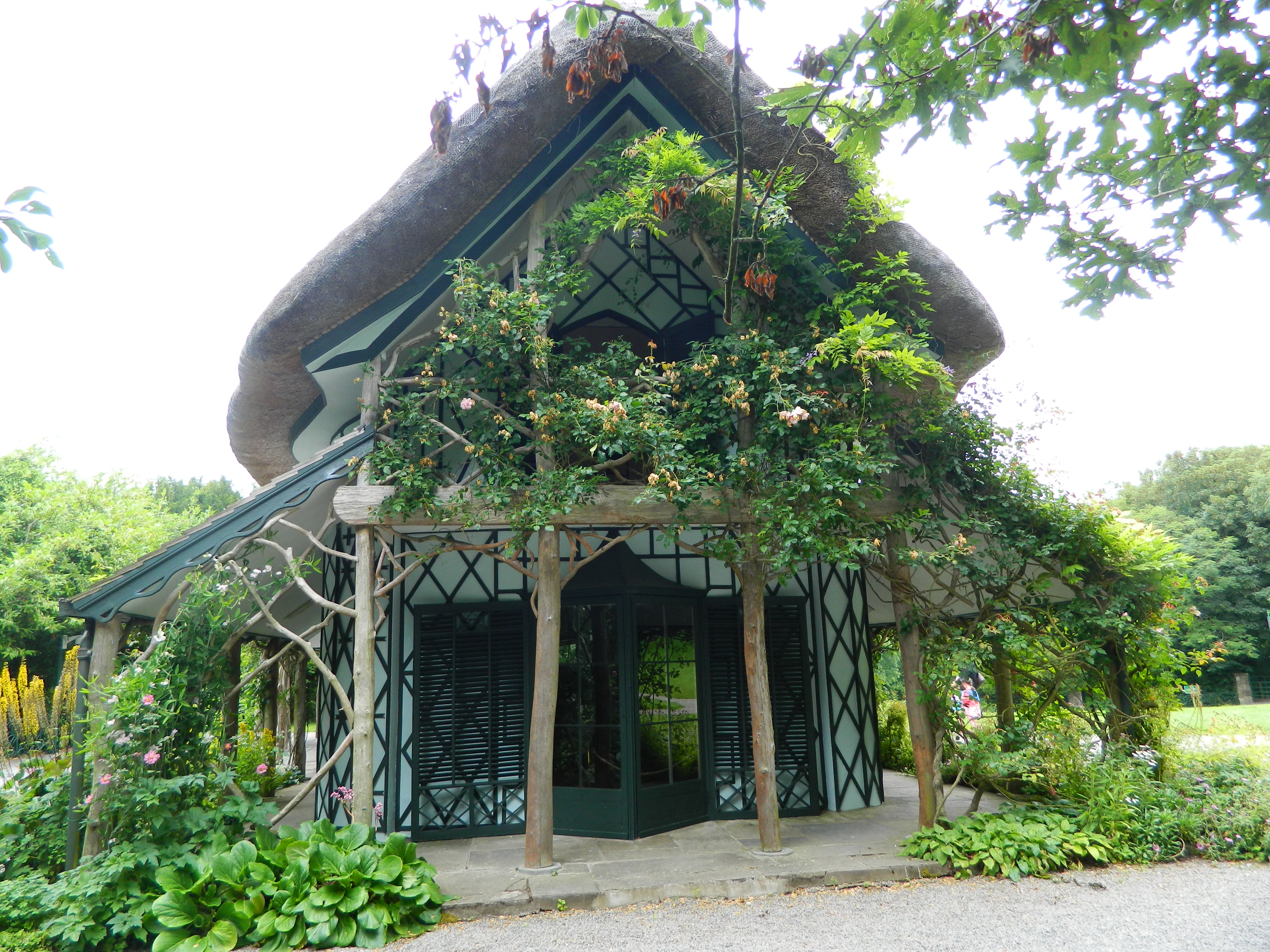
Left side
