= Thomas Caulfield Irwin =

Thomas Caulfield Irwin (4 May 1823 – 20 February 1892) was an Irish poet, writer, and classical scholar.

Irwin was born in Warrenpoint, County Down, to a prosperous family. He was educated privately. He travelled to Europe and Africa but later became impoverished through the collapse of family fortunes. He took up journalism in Dublin around 1848. He was highly regarded as a poet by contemporaries.

He was a prolific writer and contributed to the Dublin University Magazine and The Nation, among other publications. Irwin wrote at least one novel and several volumes of poetry. He also carried out translations from classical and European writers.

Irwin died after some years of poverty in Rathmines, Dublin, and is buried in Mount Jerome Cemetery.

== Selected works ==
- From Caesar to Christ (novel, Dublin 1853)
- Versicles (Dublin: Wm. Hennessy 1856)
- Poems (Dublin: McGlashen & Gill 1866)
- Irish Historical and Legendary Poems (Cameron & Ferguson 1868)
- Irish Poems and Legends (Dublin, 1869)
- Songs and Romances (Dublin: Gill 1878)
- Winter and Summer Stories, and Slides of Fancy’s Lantern (Dublin: Gill 1879)
- Pictures and Songs (Dublin: Gill 1880)
- Sonnets and Poetry on the Problems of Life (Gill 1881)
- Poems, Sketches, and Songs (Dublin: Gill 1889).
