= Burrenwood =

Coordinates: 54.246°N 5.944°W

Burrenwood is a cottage orné or country house and estate near Castlewellan, County Down, Northern Ireland.

== History ==
The ornamental wooded and cottaged demesne at Burrenwood was conceived by Theodosia Hawkins-Magill (5 September 1743- 2 March 1817), the Countess of Clanwilliam, a great Ulster heiress and landowner, the daughter and heir of Robert Hawkins-Magill, of Gill Hall, Dromore, Co. Down. Having inherited her father's estates centred on Dromore and Rathfriland, as a child in 1747, she married Sir John Meade, 4th Bart., (Meade was ennobled in 1766 & 1776), in 1765.

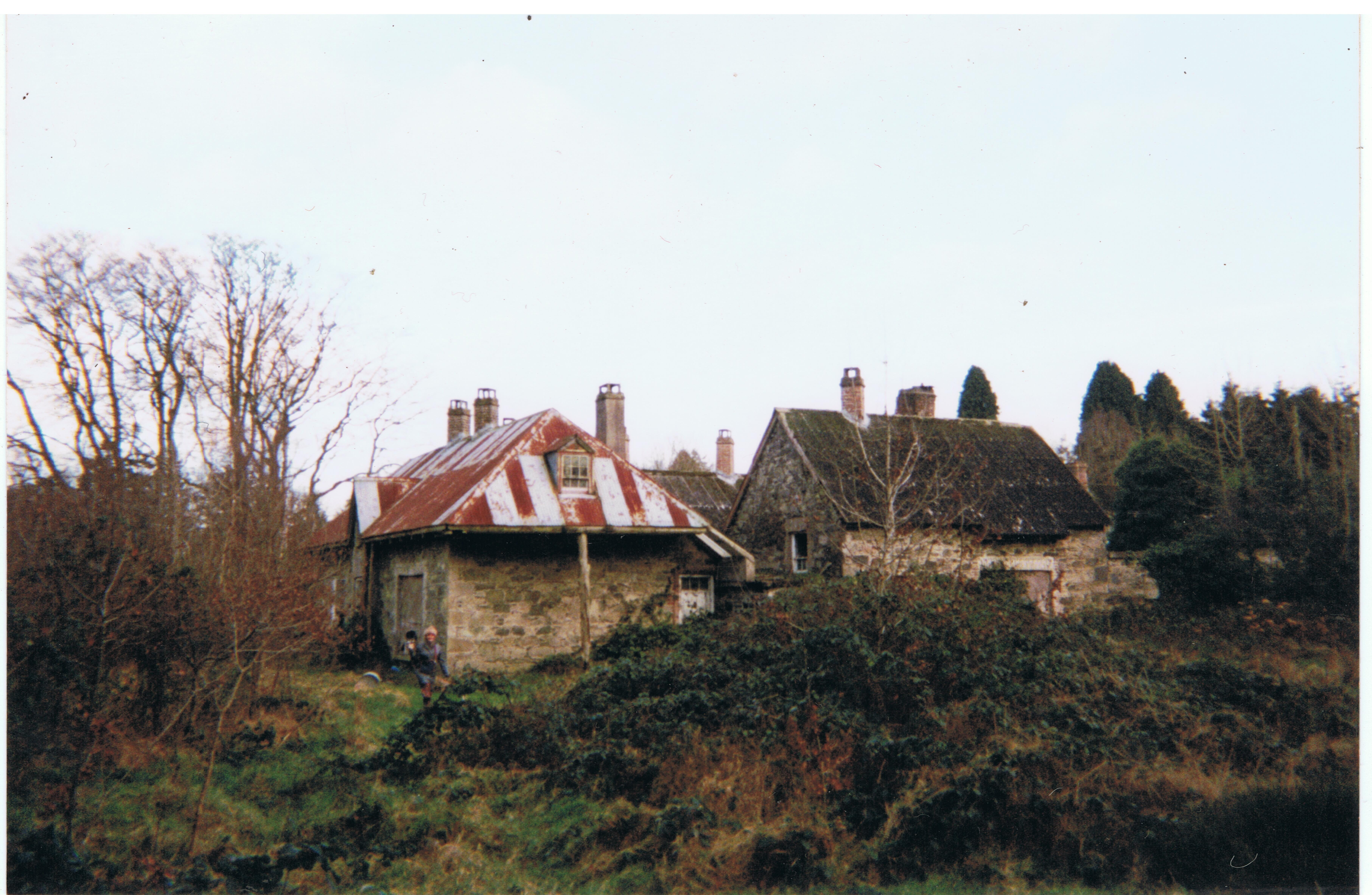
Burrenwood, January 2002

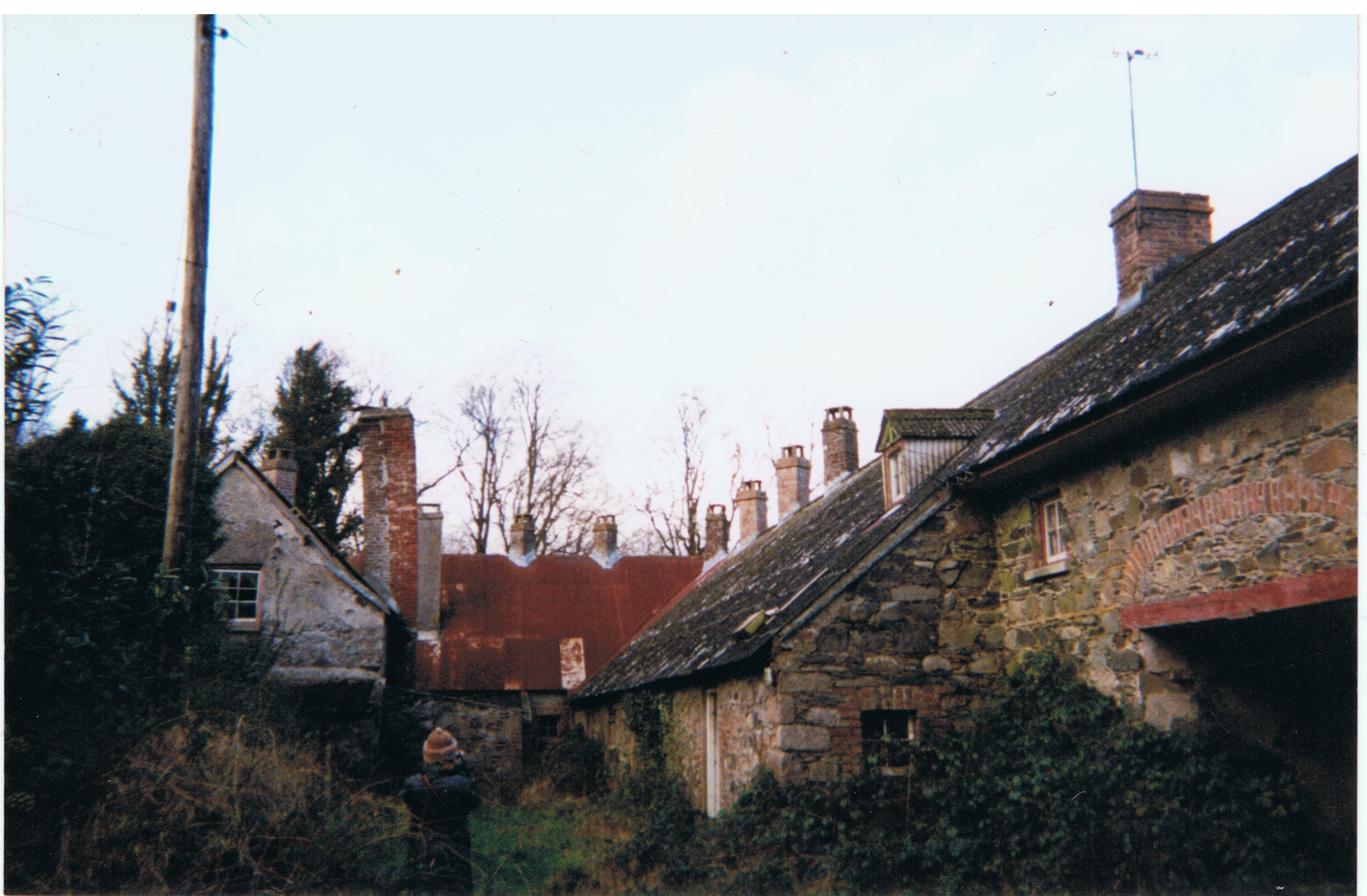
Burrenwood, January 2002, showing the back

The house, a 6,170-square-foot (573 m^{2}), horseshoe-shaped, rustic villa and cottage ornée, was built near Castlewellan in the late eighteenth century.

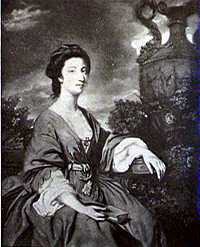
Theodosia Clanwilliam by Reynolds

It lies on some land conveniently halfway between Theodosia Clanwilliam's mother's famous new house at Castle Ward, near Strangford Lough (the mother had married Bernard Ward after the early death of Robert Hawkins-Magill), the seventeenth century holdings of Alderman William Hawkins in and near Rathfriland, the infamous and similarly ancient Magill ancestral seat at Gill Hall, near Dromore, and the Greenore ferry which was caught by way of Newry, which at one time was plague ridden, avoidance of which is said to have been the incentive to build, in six weeks, the house by the Burren.

The Countess's second son, the General the Hon. Robert Meade (*29.2.1772–11.7.1852), Ensign in the 1st Foot (11.1787), Lt. Col. of the 31st Foot (wounded 1807), commander of forces in Madeira, Colonel of the 12th Regiment, Lt. General 4.6.1814, inherited the Rathfriland estate and the Burrenwood demesne which he extended; and it remained with his family for several further generations.

Burrenwood is comparable with the Swiss cottage at Cahir; Derrymore, Bessbrook, Newry, Co. Armagh (National Trust); and the Petit hameau de la Reine at Versailles. All of which were in part inspired by Abbé Laugier, a.k.a. Marc-Antoine Laugier. It lies between the forest parks of Lords Clanbrassill and Roden's Tollymore and Lord Annesley's Castlewellan, beside the Mourne mountains (the inspiration for C. S. Lewis's Narnia) and just inland from Dundrum bay at Newcastle.
