= John Smith (vegetarian) =

English banker and vegetarianism activist (c. 1795–1870)

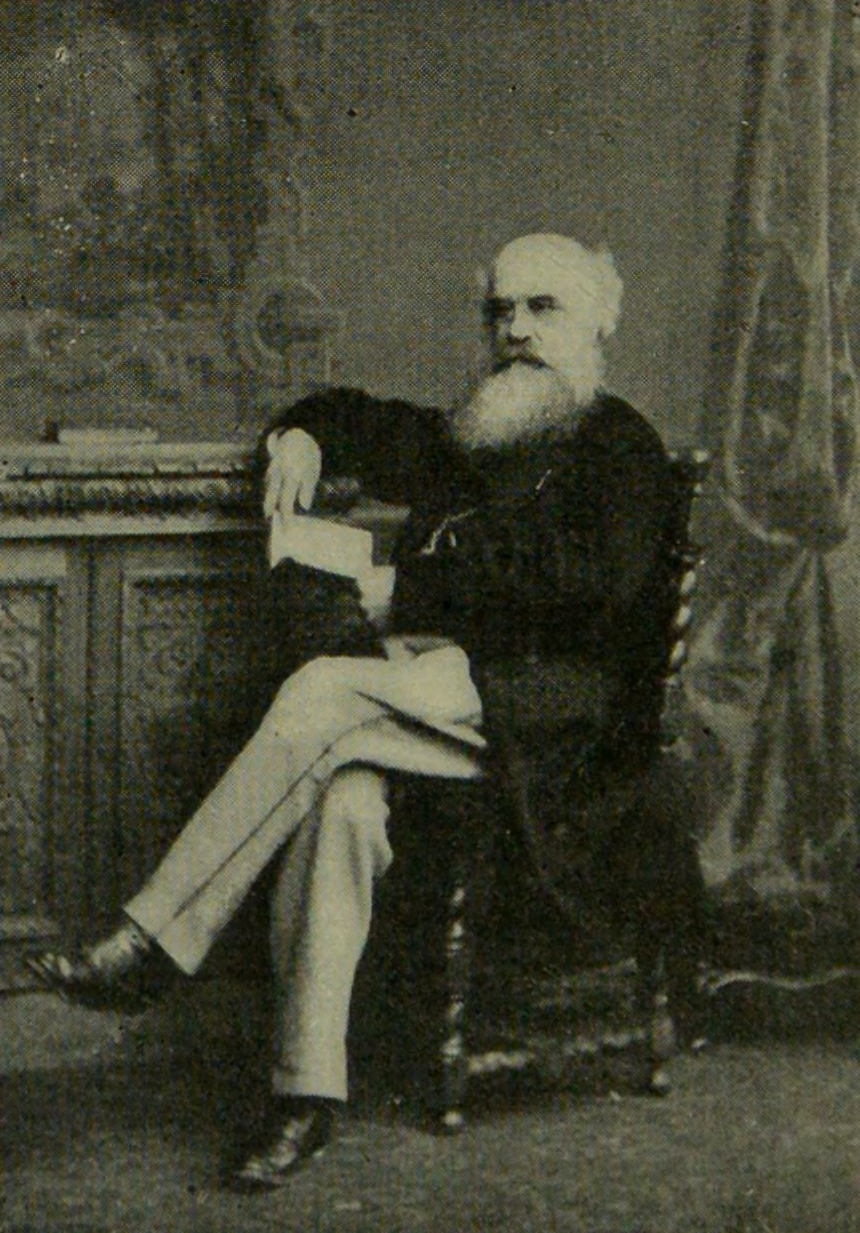
- Smith in Fifty Years of Food Reform (1898)
- Born: c. 1795; Knaresborough, West Riding of Yorkshire, England
- Died: 13 August 1870 (aged 75); Malton, North Riding of Yorkshire, England
- Occupations: Banker; vegetarianism activist; writer; spiritualist
- Organization: Hull Vegetarian Association (president)
- Known for: Vegetarianism activism
- Notable work: Fruits and Farinacea (1845)
- Spouse: Mary Smith

John Smith (c. 1795 – 13 August 1870) was an English banker, vegetarianism activist, writer, and spiritualist. Based in Malton, he managed the York City and County Bank for three decades and was an agent of the London Assurance Company. Smith was active in the Victorian vegetarian movement, serving as president of the Hull Vegetarian Association and lecturing on dietary reform. His works included Fruits and Farinacea (1845) and The Principles and Practice of Vegetarian Cookery (1860). He was also involved in spiritualism and attended the Paris Peace Conference in 1849.

== Biography ==
=== Early life and career ===
Smith was born in Knaresborough, West Riding of Yorkshire, around 1795. He later settled in Malton, North Riding of Yorkshire.

Smith worked for 30 years as manager of the York City and County Bank in Malton. He was also an agent of the London Assurance Company.

=== Vegetarianism ===
==== Advocacy ====
Smith attended the first annual meeting of the Vegetarian Society in 1848, held at Hayward's Hotel in Manchester. Charles W. Forward stated that Smith had been a vegetarian for 13 years by that point. According to historian James Gregory, Smith was led to vegetarianism after reading a paper on "Manifestation of Mind", (Note: The paper was not published until 1843, several years after Smith is said to have adopted the diet, creating a chronological inconsistency.) which drew his attention to mental similarities between humans and animals, including their shared capacity for pleasure and pain.

In 1848, Smith's advocacy helped prompt the formation of a vegetarian association in Malton, with James Simpson as president. In 1855, Smith gave a lecture in York, and the following year became president of the Hull Vegetarian Association. During his tenure, he persuaded the editor of the Hull Advertiser to adopt a vegetarian diet.

At a meeting of the Vegetarian Society in 1850, Smith addressed criticism of the use of animal products such as milk and eggs. He presented ethical and physiological arguments for vegetarianism while defending the use of such products during transitional stages. He described a fruit- and grain-based diet as the ideal, while acknowledging practical difficulties in fully adopting it.

==== Writing ====
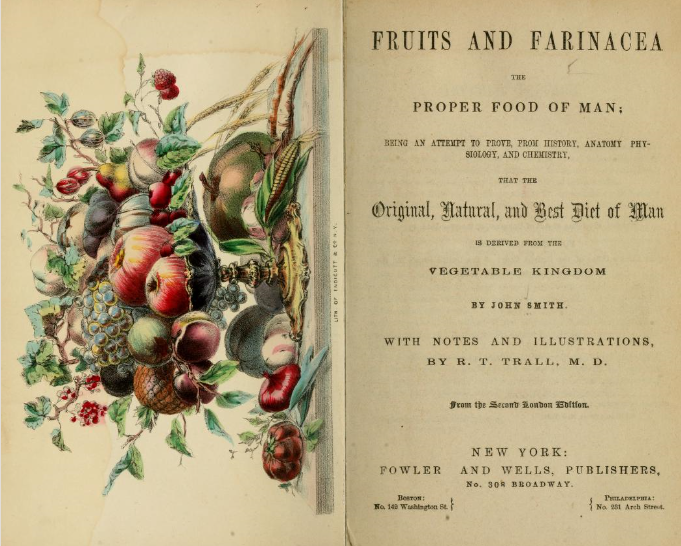
Title page of Russell Thacher Trall's second edition of Fruits and Farinacea (1854)

In 1845, Smith published Fruits and Farinacea, a work advocating vegetarianism. He dedicated the book to Dr William Lambe, an advocate of the diet. Gregory states that the book received attention in the contemporary press. A second edition was published in New York in 1854, edited and annotated by American physician Russell Thacher Trall. An abridged edition was published posthumously in 1873, edited by Francis William Newman.

In 1860, Smith published a lacto-ovo vegetarian cookbook, The Principles and Practice of Vegetarian Cookery, written at the request of James Simpson and dedicated to him. A second edition appeared in 1866 under the title Vegetable Cookery.

=== Other interests ===
Smith lectured on scientific topics and spiritualism. In 1849, he attended the Paris Peace Conference.

=== Personal life and death ===
Smith was married to Mary Smith. He died at his home, The Mount, Malton, on 13 August 1870, aged 75. Several local businesses closed on the day of his funeral.

== Legacy ==
Fruits and Farinacea was among the works that influenced Scottish vegetarian activist John Davie to adopt vegetarianism.

In Fifty Years of Food Reform (1898), Charles W. Forward described Fruits and Farinacea as "the most comprehensive and complete work on the subject published in England up to that date". James Gregory has described the book as a "major text" for the vegetarian movement.

== Publications ==
- Fruits and Farinacea: The Proper Food of Man (1845)
- The Principles and Practice of Vegetarian Cookery (1860)

== See also ==
- History of vegetarianism
- Vegetarianism in the Victorian era
