= Mount Jerome Cemetery and Crematorium =

Cemetery in Dublin, Ireland

Mount Jerome Cemetery
- Reilig Chnocán Iaróm
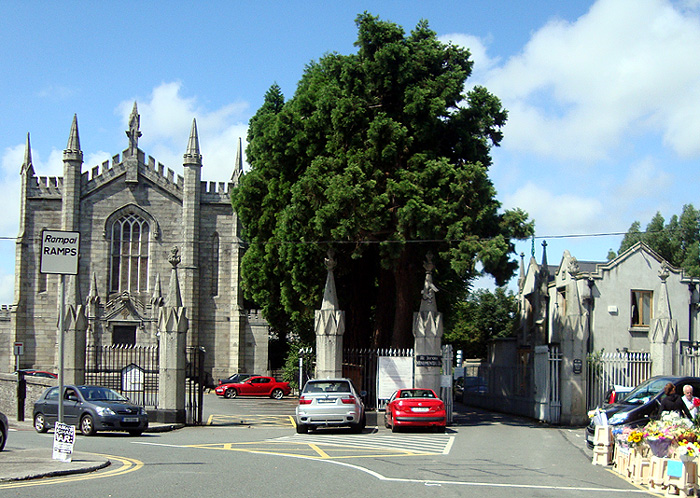
- The entrance to Mount Jerome, on right.
- Interactive map of Mount Jerome Cemetery

Details
- Established: 1836
- Location: 158 Harold's Cross Road, Harold's Cross, Dublin
- Country: Ireland
- Coordinates: 53°19′29″N 6°17′03″W
- Type: garden cemetery
- Owned by: General Cemetery Company of Dublin
- Size: 20.2 ha (50 acres)
- No. of graves: Over 300,000
- Website: mountjerome.ie

Mount Jerome Cemetery & Crematorium (Irish: Reilig Chnocán Iaróm) is situated in Harold's Cross on the south side of Dublin, Ireland. Since its foundation in 1836, it has witnessed over 300,000 burials. Originally an exclusively Protestant cemetery, Roman Catholics have also been buried there since the 1920s.

== History ==
The name of the cemetery comes from an estate established there by the Reverend Stephen Jerome, who in 1639 was vicar of St. Kevin's Parish. At that time, Harold's Cross was part of St. Kevin's Parish. In the latter half of the 17th century, the land passed into the ownership of the Earl of Meath, who in turn leased plots to prominent Dublin families. A house, Mount Jerome House, was constructed in one of these plots, and leased to John Keogh. In 1834, after an aborted attempt to set up a cemetery in the Phoenix Park, the General Cemetery Company of Dublin bought the Mount Jerome property, "for establishing a general cemetery in the neighbourhood of the city of Dublin".

The Funerary Chapel in the cemetery was the first Puginian Gothic church in Dublin. It was designed by William Atkins.

The first official burial happened on 19 September 1836. The buried deceased were the infant twins of Matthew Pollock.

The cemetery initially started with a landmass of 26 acres and grew to a size of 48 acres in 1874.

In 1984, burial numbers were falling, thus the Cemetery was losing revenue and began to deteriorate. A crematorium was needed to regain revenue and deal with plant overgrowth on the estate. In 2000, Mount Jerome Cemetery established its own crematorium on the site.

== Notable burials ==
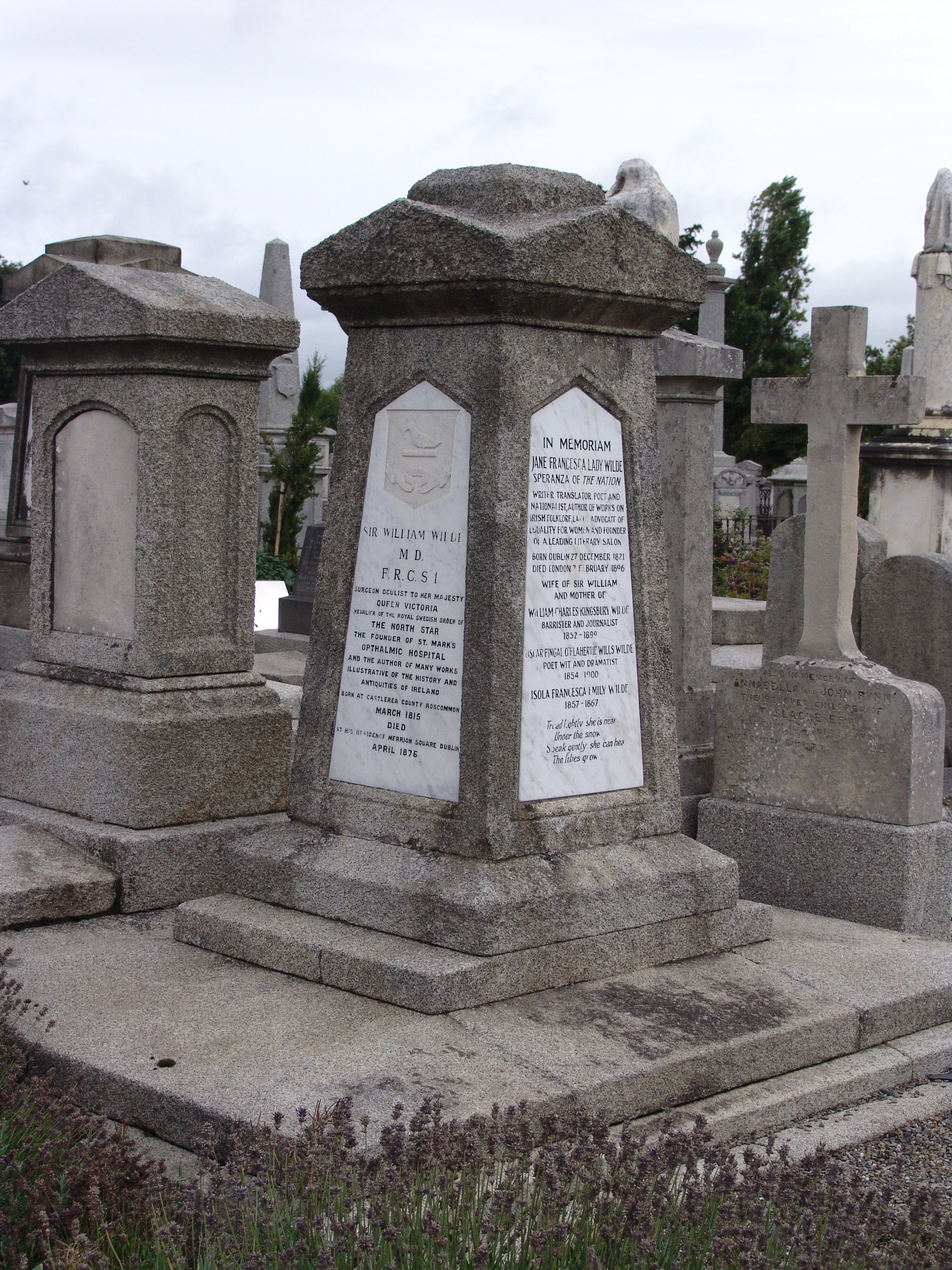
Memorial to Sir William Wilde and Lady Wilde, parents of Oscar Wilde

Notable people buried here include:

- Robert Adams (1791–1875), physician and professor of surgery
- Maeve Binchy (1940–2012), author (cremated)
- Fritz Brase (1875–1940), German military musician and composer
- Edward Bunting (1773–1843), musician, music-collector
- Frederick William Burton (1816–1900), painter and director of the National Gallery
- Peter Caffrey (1949–2008), actor (cremated)
- Sir Charles Cameron (1830–1921), headed, for 50 years, the Public Health Department of Dublin Corporation (and two of his sons)
- James Campbell, 1st Baron Glenavy (1851–1931), lawyer, politician and Lord Chancellor of Ireland
- William Carleton (1794–1869), writer
- Thomas Caulfield Irwin (1823–1892), poet, writer, scholar
- Michael Colivet (1882–1955), Irish politician, Commandant of the Irish Volunteers for Limerick City, a founding member of the Irish Republic and, in later years, Chairman of the National Housing Board
- Abraham Colles (1773–1843), surgeon, professor of medicine
- Meg Connery (1881–1958), suffragist organiser and activist.
- John Augustus Conolly VC (1829–1888), soldier
- John Oliver Curran (1819–1847), physician
- Paddy Daly (1888–1957), member of the IRA during the War of Independence and later Major-General in the Irish Army
- Achilles Daunt (1832–1878), preacher and homilist
- Derek Davis (1948–2015), broadcaster
- Thomas Davis, (1814–1845), journalist, politician, founder of The Nation newspaper
- Thomas Drummond (1797–1840), surveyor, Under-Secretary for Ireland
- Professor George Francis FitzGerald (1851–1901), physicist
- Ethel Kathleen French (née Moore, 1871–1891), artist and illustrator, first wife of Percy French
- Robert French (1841–1917), photographer and former Irish Constabulary sub-constable
- Edward Gibson, 1st Baron Ashbourne (1837–1913), lawyer and Lord Chancellor of Ireland
- Robert Graves (1796–1853), professor of medicine and writer
- Robert Perceval Graves (1810–1893), biographer of William R. Hamilton
- Sir Richard John Griffith (1784–1878), geologist, mining engineer, chairman of the Board of Works, author of Griffith's Valuation
- Thomas Grubb (1800–1878), optician, telescope-maker
- Benjamin Guinness (1798–1868), brewer, philanthropist, and other members of the Guinness family
- George Halpin (1779–1854), civil engineer and lighthouse builder
- William Rowan Hamilton (1805–1865), mathematician and astronomer
- James Haughton (1795–1873), social reformer
- Con Houlihan (1925-2012), sportswriter (cremated)
- John Kells Ingram (1823–1907), politician, scholar, mathematician and poet ("The Memory of the Dead")
- John Hewitt Jellett (1817–1888), mathematician and Provost of Trinity College
- John Edward Jones (1806–1862), civil engineer and sculptor
- David Kelly (1929–2012), actor (cremated)
- John Mitchell Kemble (1807–1857), scholar
- Joseph Robinson Kirk (1821–1894), sculptor, who also executed the figure over the memorial of his father, Thomas
- Thomas Kirk (1781–1845), sculptor, who also designed the Butler mausoleum in this cemetery
- Thomas Hawkesworth Ledwich (1823–1858), surgeon and anatomist
- Thomas Langlois Lefroy (1776–1869), politician and judge
- Percy Ludgate (1883–1922), accountant mathematician and inventor; designer of the second analytical engine
- Jan Lukasiewicz (1878–1956), Polish philosopher, logician and mathematician
- David Marcus (1924–2009), Irish Jewish writer/editor
- Sir Henry Marsh (1770–1860), physician
- William Ramsay McNab (1844–1889), Scottish physician and botanist
- William Fetherstone Montgomery (1797–1859), obstetrician
- Arthur Thomas Moore VC (1830–1912), soldier
- Hans Garrett Moore VC (1830–1889), soldier

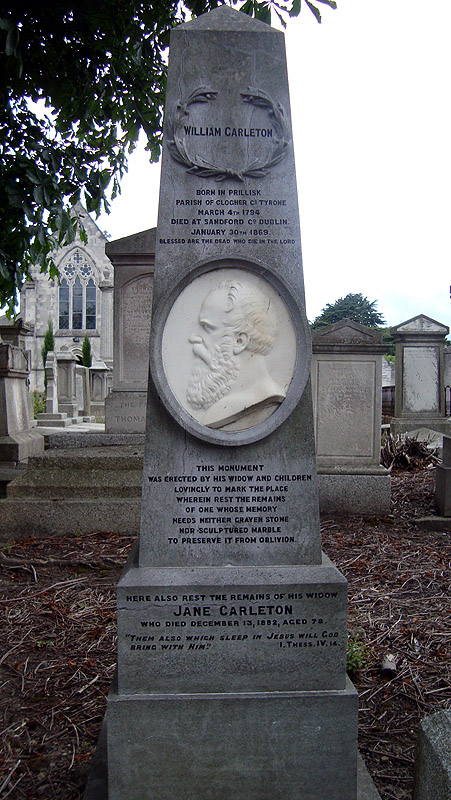
Grave of William Carleton

- Sir Richard Morrison (1767–1849), architect (Pro-Cathedral, Trinity College)
- William Vitruvius Morrison (1794–1838), architect
- John Skipton Mulvany (1813–1870), architect who also designed a number of monuments in this cemetery, including the Mahony monument and Perry and West vaults
- Máirtín Ó Cadhain (1906–1970), Irish-language writer
- Máirtín Ó Direáin, (1910–1988), Irish-language poet
- Walter Osborne (1859–1903), artist
- William McFadden Orr (1866–1934), mathematician
- George Papworth (1781–1855), architect
- Basil Payne (1923–2012) poet
- Jacob Owen (1778–1870), architect and engineer to the Board of Works
- Edward Arthur Henry Pakenham, 6th Earl of Longford (1902–1961) was an Irish peer, politician, and littérateur
- George Petrie (1790–1886), artist archaeologist, musician
- William Plunket, 4th Baron Plunket (1828–1897), Archbishop of Dublin
- Sarah Purser (1848–1943), artist
- George Russell (1867–1935), writer and artist
- Cecil Sheridan (1910–1980), comedian and actor
- Joseph Sheridan Le Fanu (1814–1873), writer and editor (along with his wife, Susanna Bennett, her father and two brothers, in the same vault)
- Robert William Smith (1807–1873), pathologist
- Ellen Smyly (1815–1901), founder of the Smyly Homes
- Bindon Blood Stoney (1828–1909), engineer
- John Millington Synge (1871–1909), playwright
- Isaac Weld (1774–1856), topographical writer, explorer and artist
- Sir William Wilde (1815-1876), father of Oscar Wilde. His wife, Jane Francesca Elgee, is commemorated on Sir William's monument, but she was buried in Kensal Green Cemetery in London.
- S. Allen Windle (1828–1880), Chaplain of the Mariners' Church, Dún Laoghaire
- Edward Perceval Wright (1834–1910), ophthalmic surgeon, botanist and zoologist
- Jack Butler Yeats (1871–1957), artist

There is a large plot dedicated to deceased members of the Royal Irish Constabulary and the Dublin Metropolitan Police.

The cemetery contains the war graves of 35 British Commonwealth service personnel from World War I and 39 from World War II.

The remains of French Huguenots from St. Peter's Churchyard, Peter's Row (now the location of the Dublin YMCA), which was demolished in the 1980s, and from St. Brigid's and St. Thomas's churchyards are interred in the cemetery.

Over 200 children of unmarried mothers who died in the Protestant-run Bethany Home were buried in unmarked graves in the cemetery. There is a plot where unnamed children from Kirwan House, the Protestant-run Female Orphan Home, are buried.

Recent burials include the notorious Martin Cahill (1949–1994) (known as "The General"). His gravestone has been vandalised on numerous occasions and is currently broken in two with the top half missing. His body has since been removed to an unmarked grave in the cemetery.

== Flora ==
The cemetery has one of only two Christ-thorn bushes in Ireland (the other is in the Botanic Gardens).

== Literary references ==
1. Then Mount Jerome for the protestants. Funerals all over the world everywhere every minute. Shovelling them under by the cartload doublequick. Thousands every hour. Too many in the world. Ulysses, Chapter 6, Hades episode, James Joyce.
