= Canon arithmeticus =

1839 mathematical tables by Carl Jacobi

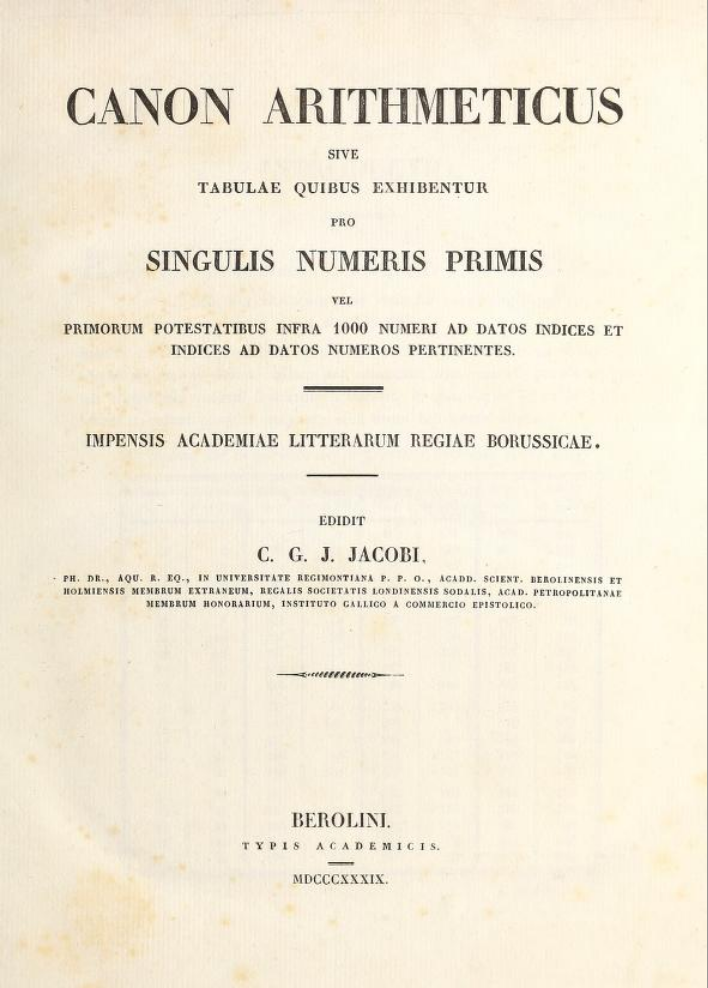
Title page of Jacobi's Canon Arithmeticus, published in 1839

The Canon arithmeticus is a set of mathematical tables of indices and powers with respect to primitive roots for prime powers less than 1000, originally published by Carl Gustav Jacob Jacobi (1839), with introductory text in Latin. The tables were at one time used for arithmetical calculations modulo prime powers, though like many mathematical tables, they have now been replaced by digital computers. Jacobi also reproduced Burkhardt's table of the periods of decimal fractions of 1/p and Ostrogradsky's tables of primitive roots of primes less than 200 and gave tables of indices of some odd numbers modulo powers of 2 with respect to the base 3 (Dickson 2005, p. 185–186).

Although the second edition of 1956 has Jacobi's name on the title, it has little in common with the first edition apart from the topic: the tables were completely recalculated, usually with a different choice of primitive root, by Wilhelm Patz. Jacobi's original tables use 10 or −10 or a number with a small power of this form as the primitive root whenever possible, while the second edition uses the smallest possible positive primitive root (Fletcher 1958).

The term "canon arithmeticus" is occasionally used to mean any table of indices and powers of primitive roots.

== See also ==
- A. W. Faber Model 366, a discrete slide rule incorporating similar concepts to the Canon arithmeticus
