= Percy Ludgate =

Irish accountant and inventor

Percy Edwin Ludgate
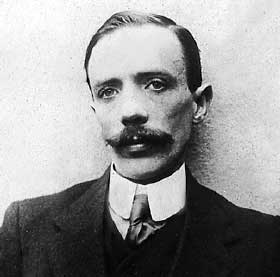
- Portrait photograph of Percy Ludgate
- Born: 2 August 1883; Skibbereen, County Cork, Ireland
- Died: 16 October 1922 (aged 39); Dublin, Ireland
- Resting place: Mount Jerome Cemetery, Dublin
- Known for: Design of the second analytical engine in history
- Scientific career
- Fields: mechanical computer design & discrete logarithms (1909); Accountancy (1917)
- Workplaces: Kevans & Son (Dublin, Ireland)

Percy Edwin Ludgate (2 August 1883 – 16 October 1922) was an Irish amateur scientist who, in 1909, designed an analytical engine (a general-purpose Turing-complete computer, and the second of its kind). This machine was to be capable of storing 192 numbers, each containing 20 digits, and as part of the design, he devised a number of novel techniques, including Irish logarithms.

== Life ==
Ludgate was born on 2 August 1883 in Skibbereen, County Cork, to Michael Ludgate and Mary McMahon. In the 1901 census, he is listed as Civil Servant National Education (Boy Copyist) in Dublin. In the 1911 census, he is also in Dublin, as a Commercial Clerk (Corn Merchant). He studied accountancy at Rathmines College of Commerce, earning a gold medal based on the results of his final examinations in 1917. At some date before or after then, he joined Kevans & Son, accountants.

== Work on analytical engine ==
It seems that Ludgate worked as a clerk for an unknown corn merchant, in Dublin, and pursued his interest in calculating machines at night. Charles Babbage in 1843 and Ludgate in 1909 designed the only two mechanical analytical engines before the electromechanical analytical engine of Leonardo Torres Quevedo of 1920 and its few successors, and the six first-generation electronic analytical engines of 1949.

Working alone, Ludgate designed an analytical engine while unaware of Babbage's designs, although he later went on to write about Babbage's machine. Ludgate's engine used multiplication as its base mechanism (unlike Babbage's which used addition). It incorporated the first multiplier-accumulator, and was the first to exploit a multiplier-accumulator to perform division, using multiplication seeded by reciprocal, via the convergent series (1 + x)^{−1}.

Ludgate's engine also used a mechanism similar to slide rules, but employing unique, discrete "Logarithmic Indexes" (now known as Irish logarithms), as well as a novel memory system utilizing concentric cylinders, storing numbers as displacements of rods in shuttles. His design featured several other novel features, including for program control (e.g., preemption and subroutines – or microcode, depending on one's viewpoint). The design is so dissimilar from Babbage's that it can be considered a second, unique type of analytical engine, which thus preceded the third (electromechanical) and fourth (electronic) types. The engine's precise mechanism is unknown, as the only written accounts which survive do not detail its workings, although he stated in 1914 that "[c]omplete descriptive drawings of the machine exist, as well as a description in manuscript" – these have never been found.

Ludgate was one of just a few independent workers in the field of science and mathematics. His inventions were worked on outside a lab. He worked on them only part-time, often until the early hours of the morning. Many publications refer to him as an accountant, but that came only after his 1909 analytical engine paper. Little is known about his personal life, as his only known records are his scientific writings. Prior to 2016, the best source of information about Ludgate and his significance was in the work of Professor Brian Randell. Since then, further investigation is underway at Trinity College, Dublin under the auspices of the John Gabriel Byrne Computer Science Collection.

Ludgate died of pneumonia on 19 October 1922, and is buried in Mount Jerome Cemetery in Dublin.

== Legacy ==
In 1960, a German patent lawyer working on behalf of IBM successfully relied on Ludgate’s 1909 paper to defeat an important 1941 patent application by the pioneering computer scientist Konrad Zuse. Had the patent been approved, Zuse would have controlled the primary intellectual property for crucial techniques that all computers now use; this would have changed his career and could well have altered the commercial trajectory of the computer industry.

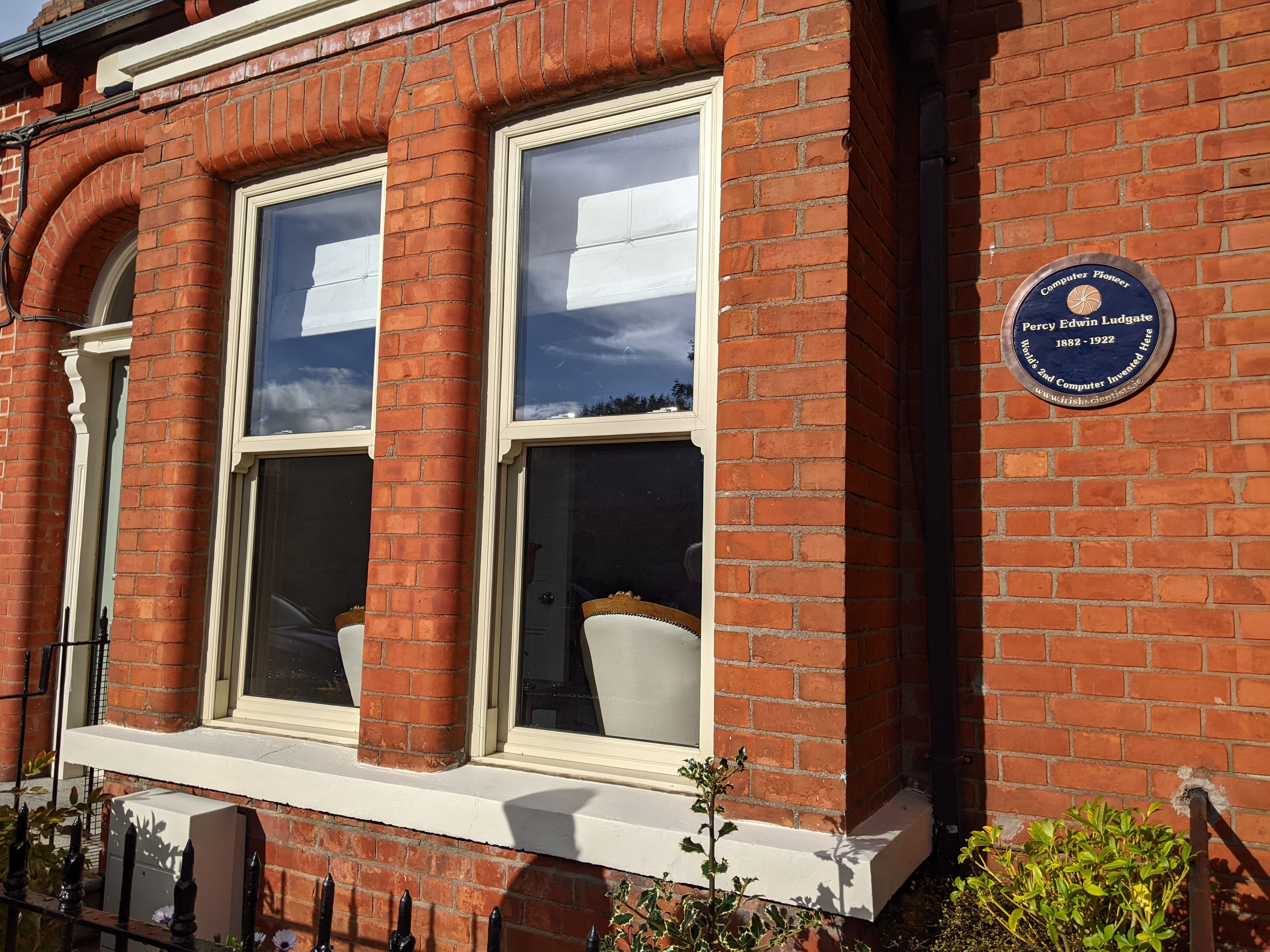
Plaque to Ludgate at his home in Drumcondra

In 1991, a prize for the best final-year project in the Moderatorship in computer science course at Trinity College, Dublin – the Ludgate Prize – was instituted in his honour, and in 2016 the Ludgate Hub e-business incubation centre was opened in Skibbereen, where he was born.

In October 2022, a plaque from the National Committee for Commemorative Plaques in Science and Technology was unveiled at Ludgate's home in Drumcondra by the Provost of Trinity College, Linda Doyle. (As can be seen in the photo, the year of birth is listed incorrectly on the plaque.)

Also in 2022, a podcast with Dr Chris Horn discussed Percy Ludgate, then in October 2024 a podcast on Percy Ludgate was created by Google's Gemini A.I..

== See also ==
- List of pioneers in computer science

== Bibliography ==
- Ludgate, Percy E. (April 1909). "On a proposed analytical machine". Scientific Proceedings of the Royal Dublin Society. 12 (9): 77–91. Available on-line at: Fano.co.UK
- Ludgate, P. E. (1914). "Automatic calculating machines". In Ellice Martin Horsburgh (ed.). Napier tercentenary celebration: Handbook of the exhibition of Napier relics and of books, instruments, and devices for facilitating calculation. Royal Society of Edinburgh. pp. 124–127.
- Randell, Brian (1971). "Ludgate's analytical machine of 1909". The Computer Journal. 14 (3): 317–326. doi:10.1093/comjnl/14.3.317. (A subscription to the journal or payment on a per-article basis is required to view this article) – full version
- Randell, Brian (1982). "From analytical engine to electronic digital computer: The contributions of Ludgate, Torres, and Bush" (PDF). IEEE Annals of the History of Computing. 4 (4): 327–341. doi:10.1109/MAHC.1982.10042.
- McQuillan, David. "The Feasibility of Ludgate's Analytical Machine".
- "Percy E. Ludgate" (PDF). (extensive background and research document), and "related folder".. In: online catalog of The John Gabriel Byrne Computer Science Collection
- Brian Coghlan (2019) "An exploration of the life of Percy Ludgate": "without animation" (PDF). and "with animation" (PDF)., presented at the West Cork History Festival 2019, Skibbereen, Ireland
- Coghlan, Brian; Randell, Brian; Hockie, Paul; Gonzalez, Trish; McQuillan, David; O’Regan, Reddy (2020). "Investigating the Work and Life of Percy Ludgate". IEEE Annals of the History of Computing. 43: 19–37. doi:10.1109/MAHC.2020.3038431. S2CID 229263309. (see also )
- Coghlan, Brian; Randell, Brian; Hockie, Paul; Gonzalez, Trish; McQuillan, David; O’Regan, Reddy (2021). "Percy Ludgate (1883-1922), Ireland's first computer designer". Proceedings of the Royal Irish Academy: Archaeology, Culture, History, Literature. 121C: 303. doi:10.3318/priac.2021.121.09. S2CID 240508861. (see also )
- "The John Gabriel Byrne Computer Science Collection". online catalog
- "Investigating Percy Ludgate and his Analytical Machine". Mobile-friendly Ludgate folder of the above catalog
- Coghlan, Brian; Randell, Brian (2022). Percy Ludgate (1883-1922): Ireland's First Computer Designer. The John Gabriel Byrne Computer Science Collection. pp. 1–240. ISBN 978-1-911566-29-8. (see Book Depository , also see BookFinder )
- Coghlan, Brian; Randell, Brian; Buelow, Ralf (2024). "How Percy Ludgate's 1909 Paper (and IBM) Helped Thwart Konrad Zuse's Computer Patent in 1960". IEEE Annals of the History of Computing. 1 (4): 1–17. doi:10.1109/MAHC.2024.3369024.
- "Cork's extraordinary genius who influenced the history of computing". The Irish Times. 6 June 2024.
