= Robert French (photographer) =

Irish photographer (1841–1917)

- Born: 11 November 1841; Dublin
- Died: 24 June 1917 (aged 75)
- Resting place: Mount Jerome Cemetery and Crematorium, Dublin
- Occupation: Photographer

Robert French (11 November 1841 – 24 June 1917) was an Irish photographer, known for his photographs of Irish life, landscapes, and settlements.

== Life and Work ==
Robert French was born in Dublin to William and Ellen French on the 11 November 1841; he was the eldest of seven children. William French was a court messenger.

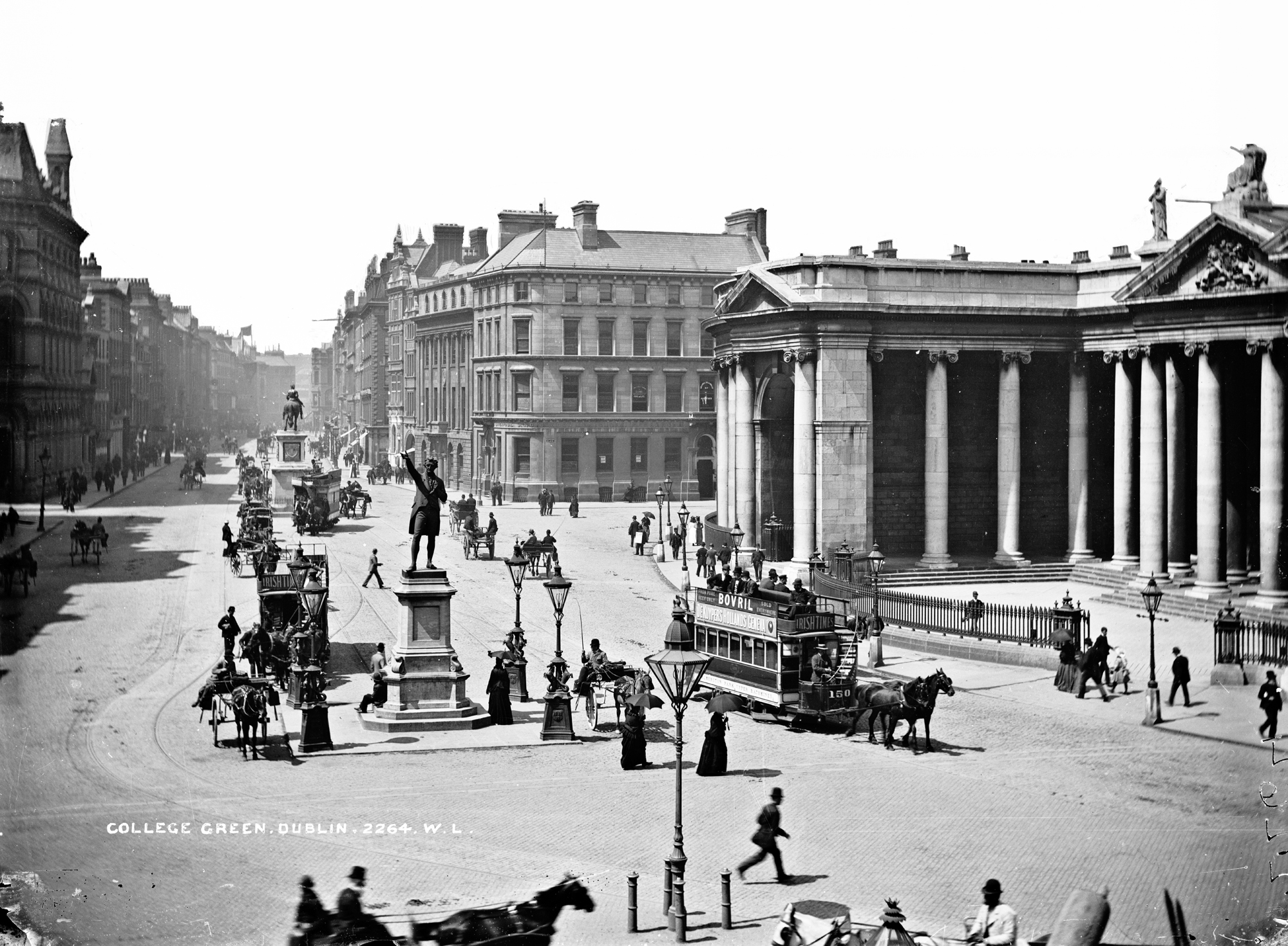
College Green, Dublin. circa 1889 – 1892

In September 1860, at 19 years old, French joined the Irish Constabulary (later the Royal Irish Constabulary) as a sub-constable and was stationed in Glenealy, County Wicklow. He resigned in August 1862.

Later, he became a photographic printer for John Fortune Lawrence at 39 Grafton Street.

On the 1 December 1865, French married Henrietta Jones at St. Peter's Church in Dublin. The couple had eleven children.

In March 1865, he was hired by John Fortune's brother, William Mervin Lawrence, the owner of a more successful photography studio at 7 Upper Sackville Street (Now O'Connell Street), located opposite the General Post Office. In the following years, French worked his way through the ranks first as a printer, colourer-retoucher, Assistant Photographer and finally, in the mid to late 1870s, he became the Chief Photographer for the studio.

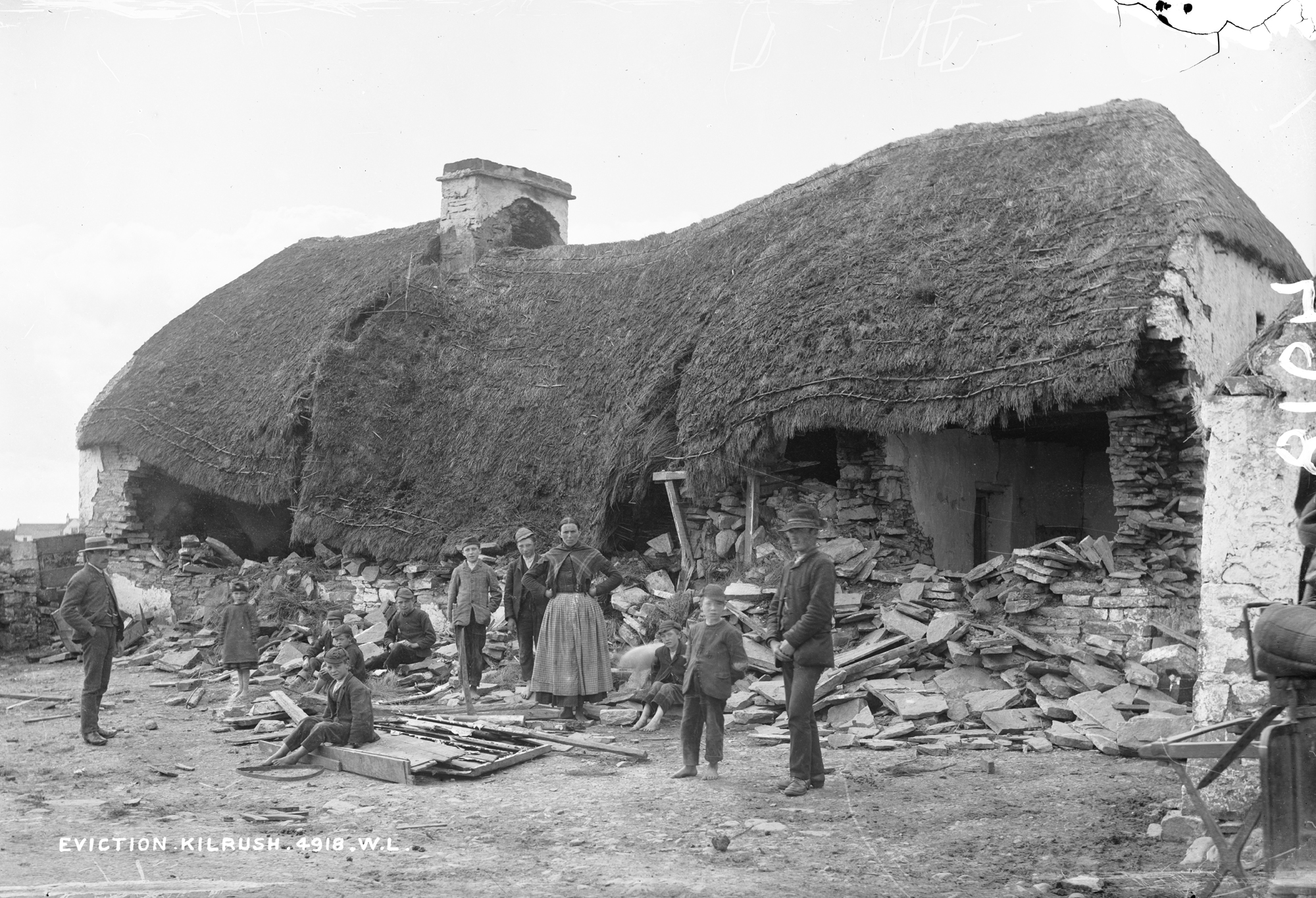
Mathias Magrath's house, Moyasta, Co.Clare after destruction by the Battering Ram. circa 1888

In the following years, he travelled throughout Ireland photographing Irish towns, villages, tourist attractions, and topographical views. His work did not include photographs of political events, however, he did document numerous evictions.

On 11 June 1905, Henrietta French passed away in Newcastle, County Wicklow. She was buried in Mount Jerome Cemetery in Dublin. Robert French retired from Lawrence's studio in 1914. He died on the 24 June 1917 at age 75 and is buried at Mount Jerome Cemetery alongside his wife and his son, Samuel H. French.

== Legacy ==
Over 500 of French's photographs were published in the United States as part of the 'Emerald Isle' Album series. This series was published in weekly parts.

In 1943, the National Library of Ireland acquired The Lawrence Collection for a sum of £300. French photographed 30,000 of the surviving 45,000 images in the collection.

French's photographs of Ireland are still popular today. They provide the most detailed glimpse into Irish life in the late 19th and early 20th centuries and can be found in many textbooks and documents detailing this time period.

A collection of photographs by Robert French can be found at the Los Angeles County Museum of Art.
