= John Churchill (publisher) =

English medical publisher

John Spriggs Morss Churchill (1801–1875) was an English medical publisher.

== Life ==
The third son of the Rev. James Churchill (1770–1820), a dissenting minister, by his wife Mary née Morss (1775–1820), a daughter of George Morss, he was born at Ongar in Essex, 4 August 1801. He was educated at Henley Grammar School.

In 1816 Churchill was bound an apprentice for seven years to Elizabeth Cox & Son, medical booksellers, of 39 High Street, Southwark. Having served his time he became a freeman of the Stationers' Company, and then for about eighteen months was employed in the house of Longman & Co.

With the fortune of his wife, whom he married in 1832, Churchill started in business on his own account, purchasing the old-established retail connection of Callow & Wilson, 16 Princes Street, Leicester Square. Churchill attended book sales and the sales of medical libraries all over the country, and issued an annual catalogue. The business increased, but not satisfactorily, owing to the new practice of "underselling" (discounting popular titles). Churchill therefore began to publish on his own account.

In 1854 Churchill removed from Princes Street to New Burlington Street, gave up retail trade, and concentrated on publishing. He built a house at Wimbledon in 1852; in 1861 he was made a county magistrate. He finally settled in 1862 at Pembridge Square, Bayswater.

For many years Churchill was an invalid; in July 1875 he went to Tunbridge Wells, where he died on 3 August. He was buried in Brompton cemetery. The publishing business was carried on by his two sons, John and Augustus Churchill, to whom he had resigned it on retiring in 1870.

== Publisher ==
One of the earliest productions of his press was Robert Liston's Practical Surgery, 1837, of which there were repeated editions. This book carried a caduceus as Churchill's printer's mark. It has been suggested that, particularly through editions of Churchill's books in the US, the caduceus was adopted by misprision as a symbol of medicine, in place of the rod of Asclepius.

A well-known series of manuals followed. The first was Erasmus Wilson's Anatomist's Vade Mecum (1840), which was succeeded by Golding Bird's Manual of Natural Philosophy, and Diagnosis of Urinary Deposits (1844), and by George Fownes's Manual of Chemistry.

At low cost Churchill brought out illustrated works, such as Medical Botany, edited by Dr. John Stephenson and by his brother James Morss Churchill, James Wardrop's Morbid Anatomy of the Eye, Joseph Maclise's Surgical Anatomy, Francis Sibson's Medical Anatomy, and other works. He issued the anonymous bestseller Vestiges of the Natural History of Creation in 1844.

Churchill's shrewd judgment meant few failures. In 1838 he became the publisher of the British and Foreign Medical Review, after its publisher William Sherwood had died. John Forbes accepted Churchill's offer to publish, and the periodical flourished. From 1842 to 1847 Churchill was the publisher of The Lancet, and in 1850 he began the Medical Times, with which the Medical Gazette amalgamated in 1852, to form the prominent Medical Times and Gazette.

== Family ==
On 18 Jan 1832 John married Georgiana née Toussaint (1805–1878), the daughter of Joseph Toussaint (1772–1844) a wax chandler, and Mary née Brecknell (1779–1836). Their children were:

- Mary Churchill (1834–1903) who married Dr Edward Clapton LRCP FRCS (1830–1909)
- John Churchill (1838–1906) who married Felicia née Cooper (1840–1911)
- Augustus Churchill (1839–1916) who married Eleanor née Cox (1848–1931)
- Ellen Churchill (1841–1924) who married Lt-Col George Nicholson Pepper (1833–1901)
- Frederick Churchill FRCS (1843–1916) who married Frances née Butler (1846–1934), daughter of Charles Salisbury Butler MP
- Louisa Churchill (1843–1910) who married Lt Col James Peter Robinson CB (1822–1916)

== See also ==
- Caduceus as a symbol of medicine

== Notes ==
Attribution

This article incorporates text from a publication now in the public domain: Stephen, Leslie, ed. (1887). "Churchill, John Spriggs Morss". Dictionary of National Biography. Vol. 10. London: Smith, Elder & Co.
