= Mind or Instinct: An Inquiry Concerning the Manifestation of Mind by the Lower Orders of Animals =

1843 essay by Lewis H. Morgan

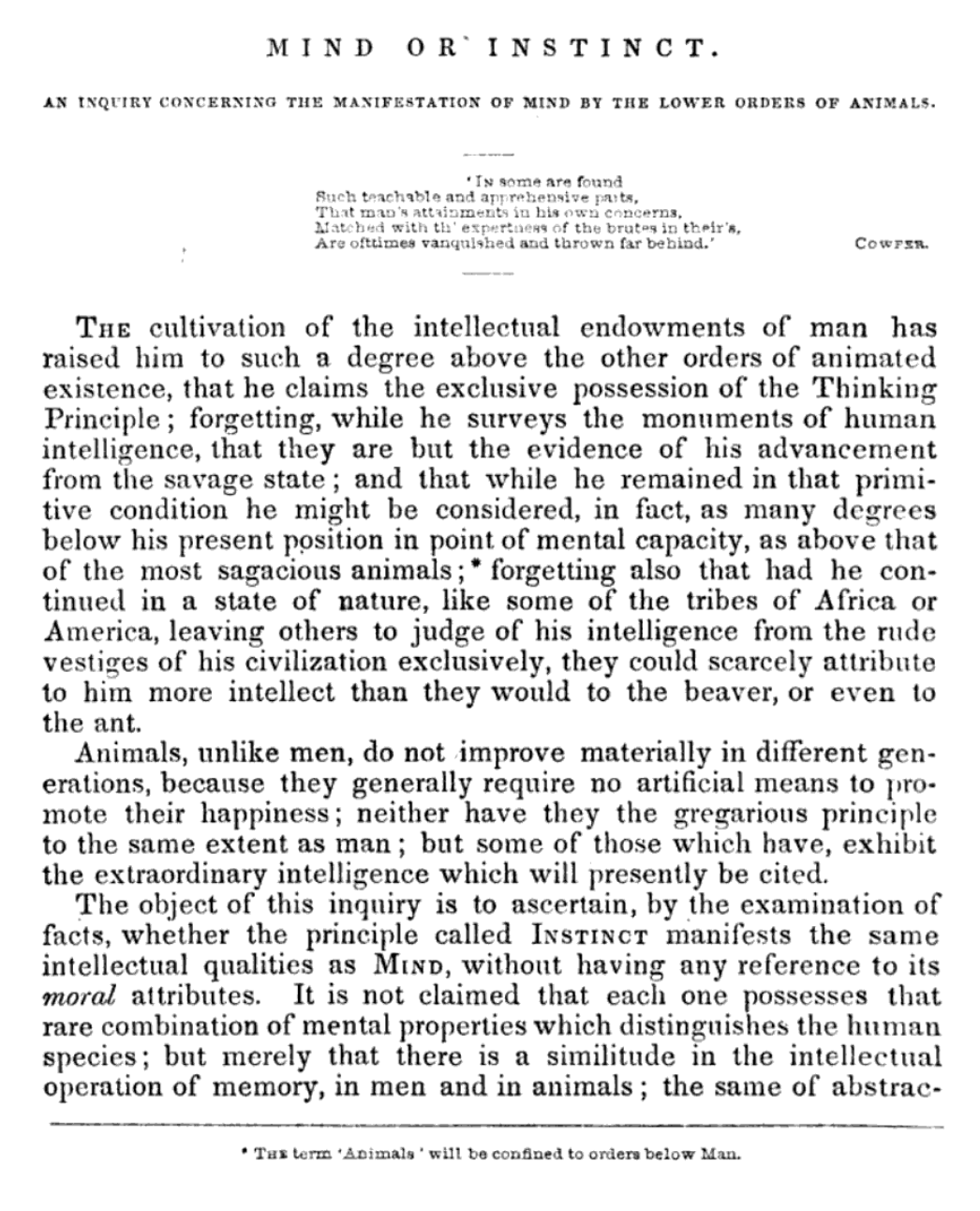
- First page of "Mind or Instinct" in The Knickerbocker, November 1843
- Author: Lewis H. Morgan as "Aquarius"
- Language: English
- Subjects: Comparative psychology; philosophy of mind
- Published: November–December 1843
- Publisher: The Knickerbocker
- Publication place: United States

"Mind or Instinct: An Inquiry Concerning the Manifestation of Mind by the Lower Orders of Animals" is an 1843 essay by American anthropologist Lewis H. Morgan, published under the pseudonym "Aquarius" in The Knickerbocker. Morgan argues that humans and other animals possess the same intellectual principle, differing in the degree to which their mental abilities are developed. Examining animal memory, abstraction, imagination and animal reasoning, he rejects the distinction between human intelligence and animal instinct as an adequate explanation of animal behavior. The essay concludes with reflections on human obligations towards animals, including opposition to cruelty and consideration of vegetarianism.

Later scholars have examined the essay as an early contribution to comparative psychology and as an expression of ideas about human-animal continuity that Morgan developed in subsequent writings.

== Background and publication ==
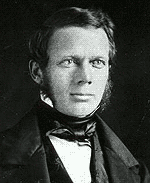
Lewis H. Morgan

Lewis H. Morgan (1818–1881) grew up on a farm near Aurora, New York. He studied classics at Cayuga Academy and Union College, graduating in 1840, and subsequently studied law. His early interests also included natural history, geology, classical literature and social reform. He delivered public lectures on subjects such as temperance and ancient Greece, and was admitted to the New York bar in 1842.

Morgan wrote "Mind or Instinct" in 1843, drawing on examples of animal behavior from natural history, personal observations and accounts supplied by others. Biographer Carl Resek identifies Buffon's Natural History, farmers' almanacs and anecdotes from Morgan's neighbors among his sources. Resek describes the essay as an attempt to establish that animals respond to their surroundings through intellectual activity rather than instinct alone.

The essay appeared in two installments in the November and December 1843 issues of The Knickerbocker, a New York literary magazine. The second installment was signed "Aquarius" and dated October 1843. Historian of psychology Timothy D. Johnston notes that Morgan initially submitted the essay through a friend, C. E. Shepherd. A letter dated October 30, 1843, from the magazine's editor, Lewis Gaylord Clark, confirmed that the first installment had been included in the November issue and that the conclusion would appear in December.

== Content ==
That principle which remembers, abstracts, imagines, and reasons, is Mind. The principle called Instinct remembers, abstracts, imagines, and reasons. Therefore, this principle is Mind.

— Lewis H. Morgan

Both installments begin with an extract from William Cowper's poem The Task (book 6), which discusses the abilities of animals:

In some are found
Such teachable and apprehensive parts,
That man's attainments in his own concerns,
Matched with th'expertness of the brutes in their's,
Are ofttimes vanquished and thrown far behind.

Gillian Feeley-Harnik places Morgan's use of Cowper within a broader Anglo-American literary interest in the relationship between humans and other animals. (Note: Morgan and his wife owned a copy of The Works of Cowper and Thomson (1841), which contained the quoted passage.)

Morgan begins by questioning whether instinct and mind are fundamentally different faculties. He argues that although people can describe the activities attributed to instinct, they know no more about its underlying nature than they do about the nature of the human mind. Because human mental faculties are inferred from speech and behavior, he maintains that similar abilities can also be inferred from the behavior of other animals.

The essay examines four faculties that Morgan considers evidence of intelligence: memory, abstraction, imagination and reason. He uses anecdotes and descriptions from natural history to argue that animals possess each faculty, although their abilities differ in strength and extent from those of humans.

=== Memory ===
Morgan describes instances of animals apparently remembering places, individuals and previous experiences. His examples include bees returning to a former food source after winter, an elephant recognizing a previous keeper after ten years and homing pigeons returning to their lofts after traveling considerable distances.

He argues that such behavior cannot be adequately explained without attributing memory to animals. Morgan also maintains that the mental process involved is fundamentally the same as human memory, even where animals demonstrate different degrees of retention or recognition.

=== Abstraction ===
Morgan next considers abstraction, which he understands as the ability to examine individual properties of an object or situation separately. He uses the construction of beaver dams as his principal example, arguing that beavers must consider a stream's width, depth and current, together with the availability of food and construction materials, when selecting a suitable site.

He similarly interprets foxes' selection of burrows and birds' choice of nesting sites as evidence that animals can distinguish among different conditions. For Morgan, these activities involve judgments comparable to those made by humans when assessing possible courses of action.

=== Imagination ===
Morgan acknowledges that imagination is more difficult to establish through observation because its operations are less directly visible in behavior. Nevertheless, he suggests that animals possess the ability to form mental representations of objects and situations not immediately present.

He cites play among young animals, including dogs shaking sticks and cats pouncing on pebbles, as possible evidence of imaginative activity. He also refers to dogs apparently dreaming during sleep, birds anticipating conditions elsewhere during migration and animals responding to seasonal or environmental changes. Morgan compares these behaviors with imaginative play and dreaming in humans.

=== Reason ===
The second installment examines animal reasoning and judgment. Morgan defines reasoning partly through the selection of appropriate means to achieve an intended result. His examples include a dog returning to a surgeon who had previously treated an injury and bringing another injured dog for assistance, and a fox apparently pretending to be dead to escape confinement.

He also discusses collective activities among beavers and ants, interpreting their construction work and division of tasks as evidence of planning and cooperation. Morgan argues that trained and domesticated animals demonstrate an ability to learn from experience and respond to different circumstances, rather than acting through an unchanging mechanical impulse.

Having examined the four faculties, Morgan concludes that the mental principle conventionally called instinct performs the same intellectual functions as the human mind. He proposes a continuous scale of intelligence extending from humans to other animals, with differences in the development of particular abilities rather than a fundamental division between human and animal intelligence.

=== Ethical reflections ===
The essay concludes by considering the moral implications of similarities between human and animal intelligence. Morgan argues that animals, like humans, have been created by God with capacities suited to their existence and that their happiness forms part of the divine purpose.

Morgan condemns the killing of animals for amusement and expresses concern about their treatment before slaughter. Although he accepts the religious argument that humans are permitted to eat animal flesh, he rejects this as a justification for cruelty and suggests that "an enlightened moral sense would teach us to abstain entirely from animal food, if we can live without it".

He also rejects the claim that animals exist solely for human use, arguing that humans have no more reason to regard other species as created exclusively for their benefit than a lion has to regard a hare in that way. He concludes that humans and animals are alike creatures of God and share in divine protection. (Note: Morgan's concluding reference to "young ravens" alludes to biblical passages concerning God's provision for animals, including Job 38:41 and Psalm 147:9.)

== Subsequent writings on animal psychology ==
Morgan returned to questions raised in "Mind or Instinct" in later writings. In an unpublished manuscript titled "Animal Psychology", dated 1857, he again rejected instinct as a separate explanatory faculty and argued that animals possess a thinking principle comparable to that of humans. Johnston observes that Morgan's criticism of instinct was more forcefully expressed in this manuscript than in some of his published work.

The manuscript formed the basis for the concluding chapter of Morgan's The American Beaver and His Works (1868). That book drew on his observations of beavers in Michigan and discussed their construction of dams, canals and lodges. Morgan used these activities to argue that complex animal behavior could be attributed to intelligence and accumulated experience rather than instinct alone.

Feeley-Harnik also connects the essay with Morgan's later anthropological writings, including Ancient Society (1877), in which comparative approaches to mental development and human social progress formed part of his analysis.

== Reception and scholarly analysis ==
The essay appeared in nineteenth-century bibliographies concerned with the nature and fate of the soul. It was listed in William Rounseville Alger's A Critical History of the Doctrine of a Future Life and Ezra Abbot's The Literature of the Doctrine of a Future Life (1871), a bibliography developed from Alger's earlier work.

Carl Resek, in Lewis Henry Morgan, American Scholar (1960), treats the essay as an early expression of Morgan's intellectual interests. Resek argues that its account of animal intelligence anticipated aspects of Morgan's subsequent scholarship, particularly the comparative study of mental development. He also compares Morgan's ideas about animals with the early notes of Charles Darwin, while distinguishing Morgan's emphasis on reasoning from explanations based primarily on instinct.

In Lewis Henry Morgan and the Invention of Kinship (1987), Thomas Trautmann identifies "Mind or Instinct" as an early statement of Morgan's concept of a continuous "scale of mind" extending across species. Trautmann relates the essay's comparative approach to Morgan's later accounts of stages of human social development and argues that Morgan's principal views on animal psychology remained largely consistent throughout his career.

In a 1989 review published in Science and Nature, Gordon Welty discusses Morgan's rejection of a strict distinction between instinct and mind. Welty interprets the essay as locating much of humanity's intellectual advantage in the development of culture rather than in an entirely separate mental endowment, contrasting Morgan's position with that of naturalists such as Louis Agassiz.

Psychologist Timothy D. Johnston identifies Morgan's writings as early contributions to questions subsequently studied in comparative psychology. Johnston notes that Morgan's rejection of instinct as an explanation of complex animal behavior anticipated criticisms advanced by some twentieth-century psychologists. He also distinguishes Morgan's theological understanding of species and intelligence from modern evolutionary explanations, while observing that Morgan attributed reasoning and, more tentatively, moral capacities to animals.

Gillian Feeley-Harnik discusses the essay in her chapter "Bodies, Words, and Works: Charles Darwin and Lewis Henry Morgan on Human-Animal Relations" (2014). She compares Morgan's arguments with Darwin's early writings on animal memory, emotion and suffering. Feeley-Harnik distinguishes Darwin's interest in descent and common ancestry from Morgan's account of intellectual and moral development within a divinely created order. She also notes that Morgan's writings on animal intelligence received comparatively little attention in the later development of comparative psychology.

== See also ==
- Animal cognition
- Animal consciousness
- Evolutional Ethics and Animal Psychology – 1897 book by Edward Payson Evans
