= Deseret alphabet =

19th-century phonetic writing system devised by the LDS Church

Deseret alphabet 𐐔𐐯𐑅𐐨𐑉𐐯𐐻
- Script type: Alphabet
- Creator: George D. Watt, under the direction of the Board of Regents, led by Brigham Young
- Published: 1854
- Period: Mainly 1854–1869; some use in modern era
- Direction: Left-to-right
- Languages: English

Related scripts
- Parent systems: Egyptian hieroglyphs: Proto-Sinaitic script; Phoenician alphabet; Greek alphabet; Old Italic; Latin alphabet; Isaac Pitman phonotypy; English Phonotypic Alphabet; Deseret alphabet

ISO 15924
- ISO 15924: Dsrt (250), Deseret (Mormon)

Unicode
- Unicode alias: Deseret
- Unicode range: U+10400–U+1044F

The Deseret alphabet (/ˌdɛzəˈrɛt/; Deseret: 𐐔𐐯𐑅𐐨𐑉𐐯𐐻 or 𐐔𐐯𐑆𐐲𐑉𐐯𐐻) is a phonemic English-language spelling reform developed between 1847 and 1854 by the board of regents of the University of Deseret under the leadership of Brigham Young, the second president of the Church of Jesus Christ of Latter-day Saints (LDS Church). George D. Watt is reported to have been the most actively involved in the development of the script's novel characters, which were used to replace those of the 1847 version of Isaac Pitman's English phonotypic alphabet. He was also the "New Alphabet's" first serious user. The script gets its name from the word deseret, a term that occurs only once in the Book of Mormon, which is said to mean "honeybee" in the only verse it is used in. This reformation of English orthography was believed by its creators to be a first step to the ultimate restoration of Adamic language.

The Deseret alphabet was an outgrowth of the Restorationist idealism and utopianism of Young and the early LDS Church. The "New Alphabet" was intended to correct "the corruptions and perversions of language which was originally pure", and to meet the urgent need for a language to "answer the demands of a constant intercommunication between several thousand languages". One "fitted to meet the great emergency of the great gathering and great work of teaching the law of the Lord to all people."

Young and the Mormon pioneers believed "all aspects of life" were in need of reform for the imminent Millennium, and the Deseret alphabet was just one of many ways in which they sought to bring about a complete "transformation in society", in anticipation of the Second Coming of Jesus.

In public statements, Young claimed the alphabet would replace the traditional Latin alphabet with an alternative, more phonetically accurate alphabet for the English language. This would offer immigrants an opportunity to learn to read and write English, the orthography of which, he said, is often less phonetically consistent than those of many other languages. Young also proposed teaching the alphabet in the school system, stating "It will be the means of introducing uniformity in our orthography, and the years that are now required to learn to read and spell can be devoted to other studies."

Between 1854 and 1869, the alphabet was used in scriptural newspaper passages, selected church records, a few diaries, and some correspondence. Occasional street signs and posters used the new letters. In 1860 a $5 gold coin was embossed 𐐐𐐬𐑊𐐨𐑌𐐮𐑅 𐐻𐐭 𐑄 𐐢𐐫𐑉𐐼 (Holiness to the Lord). In 1868–9, after much difficulty creating suitable fonts, four books were printed: two school primers, the full Book of Mormon, and a first portion of it, intended as a third school reader.

Despite repeated and costly promotion by the early LDS Church, the alphabet never enjoyed widespread use, and it has been regarded by historians as a failure. However, in recent years, aided by digital typography, the Deseret alphabet has been revived as a cultural heirloom.

== History ==
=== Creation (1847–1854) ===
The Deseret alphabet was a project of the Mormon pioneers, a group of early followers of the Church of Jesus Christ of Latter-day Saints (LDS Church) who, motivated by revelations of a unique premillennial eschatology, had set about building a unique theocracy in the Utah desert, which was then still claimed by Mexico, after the death of the church's founder, the prophet Joseph Smith. They were to build a "city of Zion" where converts would gather in preparation for the Second Coming of Christ. As part of that Gathering, in 1848, Church leaders urged converts in Europe to "emigrate as speedily as possible" to the Great Basin. There, in the "Kingdom of God", under fused theo-democratic leadership, they would be safe from the fall of the apostate world of so-called "Babylon".

March 6, 1849, Church authorities organized the "free and independent government" called the State of Deseret, while retaining the Council of Fifty. In that historical context, which has been called "The Forgotten Kingdom", there was a "compete identity of religious and temporal purpose throughout the history of the Alphabet." This theo-linguistic fusion has been noted by multiple historians.

Young wrote of the reform that "with a very few additions, it is believed, it would represent every sound used in the construction of any known language; and, in fact, a step and partial return to a pure language which has been promised unto us in the latter days", which meant the pure Adamic language spoken before the Tower of Babel. The Deseret Typographical Association called the alphabet "a forerunner in that series of developments which shall prepare mankind for the reception of pure language". Brigham Young, Church President and Prophet, the "driving force" for the reform, looked forward to the time "when a man is full of light of eternity", and stated, "I shall yet see the time that I can converse with this people without opening my mouth."

The Deseret alphabet was developed primarily by a committee made up of the board of regents of the University of Deseret, members of which included LDS Church leaders Brigham Young, Parley P. Pratt, Heber C. Kimball, and several of the other Apostles. According to Brigham Young University professor Richard G. Moore, most scholars believe that George D. Watt's contribution to the actual form the alphabet took, its unique glyphs, was the greatest; he furthermore "plant[ed] the idea of spelling reform in Brigham Young's mind" through a phonography class he gave after the death of Joseph Smith which Young attended. William W. Phelps helped "work out the letters" along with Pratt.

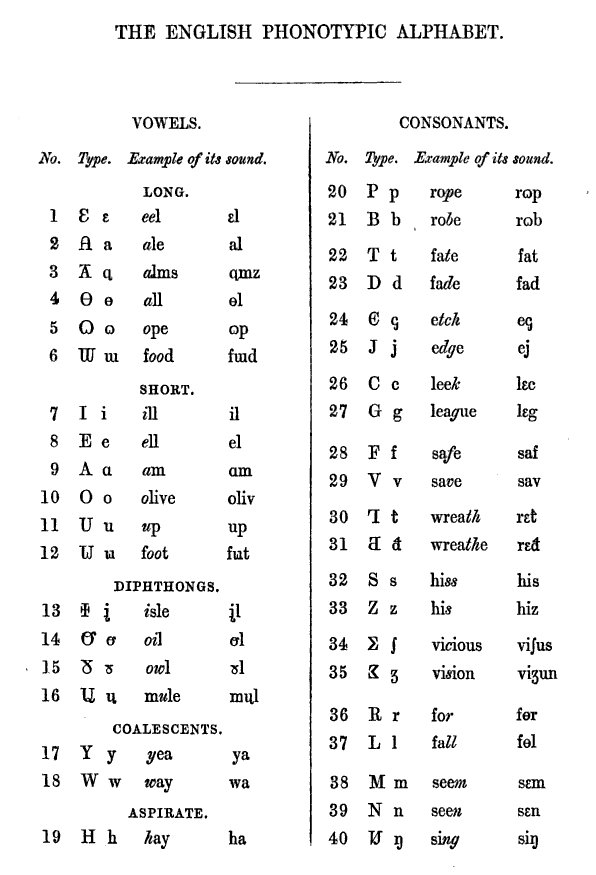
The Deseret alphabet was based on the 1847 version of Isaac Pitman's English Phonotypic Alphabet, and in fact, Pitman's alphabet was nearly chosen by the Board of Regents as their preferred spelling reform.

Before they decided on the Deseret alphabet, the attention of the board of regents was mostly focused on Pitman style alphabets, and in April 1847 Brigham Young nearly purchased 200 pounds (91 kg) of lead type to print books using Pitman's orthography. The University of Deseret was incorporated on 28 February 1850; less than three weeks later, on 20 March, the new board of regents began to discuss spelling reform.

On 29 November 1853, the committee was ready to approve a slightly modified version of the Pitman orthography, when Apostle Willard Richards, Second Counselor to Young, who had been deathly ill and missed the debate before the vote, saw the proposed alphabet, which spelled the word "phonetic" as "fɷnetic". Richards was quick to condemn it, saying to the committee: "We want a new kind of alphabet...those characters...seem like putting new wine into old bottles...I am inclined to think...we shall...throw away all characters that bear much resemblance to the English characters, and introduce an alphabet that is original...an alphabet entirely different from any alphabet in use."

These words persuaded Brigham Young and the rest of the committee, and Watt then endeavored to create an original alphabet. Less than two months later, on 19 January 1854, the board of regents finally approved the first 38-letter Deseret alphabet. One legacy of Pitman's orthography survived, though: the idea that one letter should equal one sound.

=== Use by the Mormon pioneers (1854–1869) ===
Upon the alphabet's acceptance, its first user was its principal architect, George D. Watt, who began writing the meeting minutes of the early Bishops in a cursive form of it in 1854. Almost immediately after its publication, church members began experimenting with it, and by 1855 travel writers Jules Remy and Julius Brenchley published a chart of the new alphabet which differed heavily from the 1854 version. Some early Mormons, such as Thales Hastings Haskell, began writing their personal journals in the new alphabet. Remy further reported that during his time in Salt Lake City, he saw signs on the street and above shops using the new alphabet.

After its approval by the board of regents, Brigham Young testified before the Utah territorial legislature that the new alphabet should "be thoroughly and extensively taught in all the schools". Some teaching in Utah schools did take place: John B. Milner taught the alphabet in Provo, Lehi, American Fork, and Pleasant Grove, while evening classes were taught in Salt Lake City and Farmington.

After several months' practice writing with the new alphabet, Watt wrote to Brigham Young that he was unhappy with it, and proposed a complete overhaul, which was never followed up on.

Word of the new alphabet soon spread outside Utah, and most press reports in non-Mormon papers were critical. Other writers, however, acquainted with other phonotypic and stenographic alphabets, ranged from neutral descriptions of the new alphabet to praise.

Until this point, all the printed material (mostly just charts of the alphabet and its standard orthography equivalents) had been produced with large wooden type, which was not suitable for printing at small sizes. Because the alphabet was wholly unique, no font existed, so in 1857 the board of regents appointed Erastus Snow to procure metal type from St. Louis–based font foundry Ladew & Peer. However, in May 1857 the Utah War began, and Snow left St. Louis to support the Mormon pioneers. During the war, Ladew & Peer kept working on the type, and the punches and matrices were delivered in the winter of 1858. The first use of the new type was to make a business card for George A. Smith, an early Mormon historian.

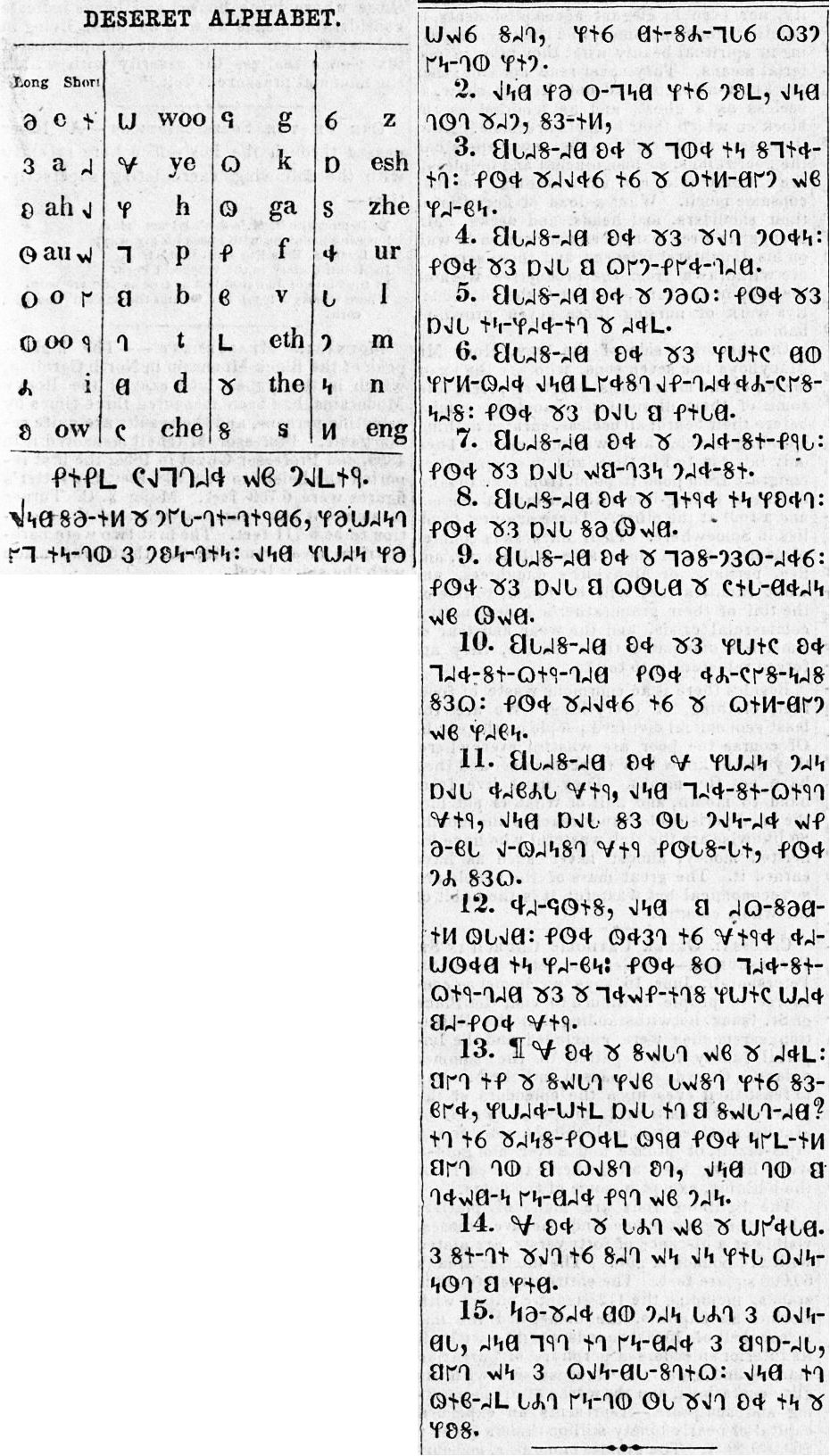
The Sermon on the Mount as it appears in the 16 February 1859 edition of the Deseret News

In 1859, with the new type in hand, the Deseret News began printing with it. It would print one piece per issue in the new alphabet, usually a quotation from The Book of Mormon or the New Testament. However, this only lasted for one year, after which the practice stopped; it would start again in May 1864 and stop permanently at the end of that year.

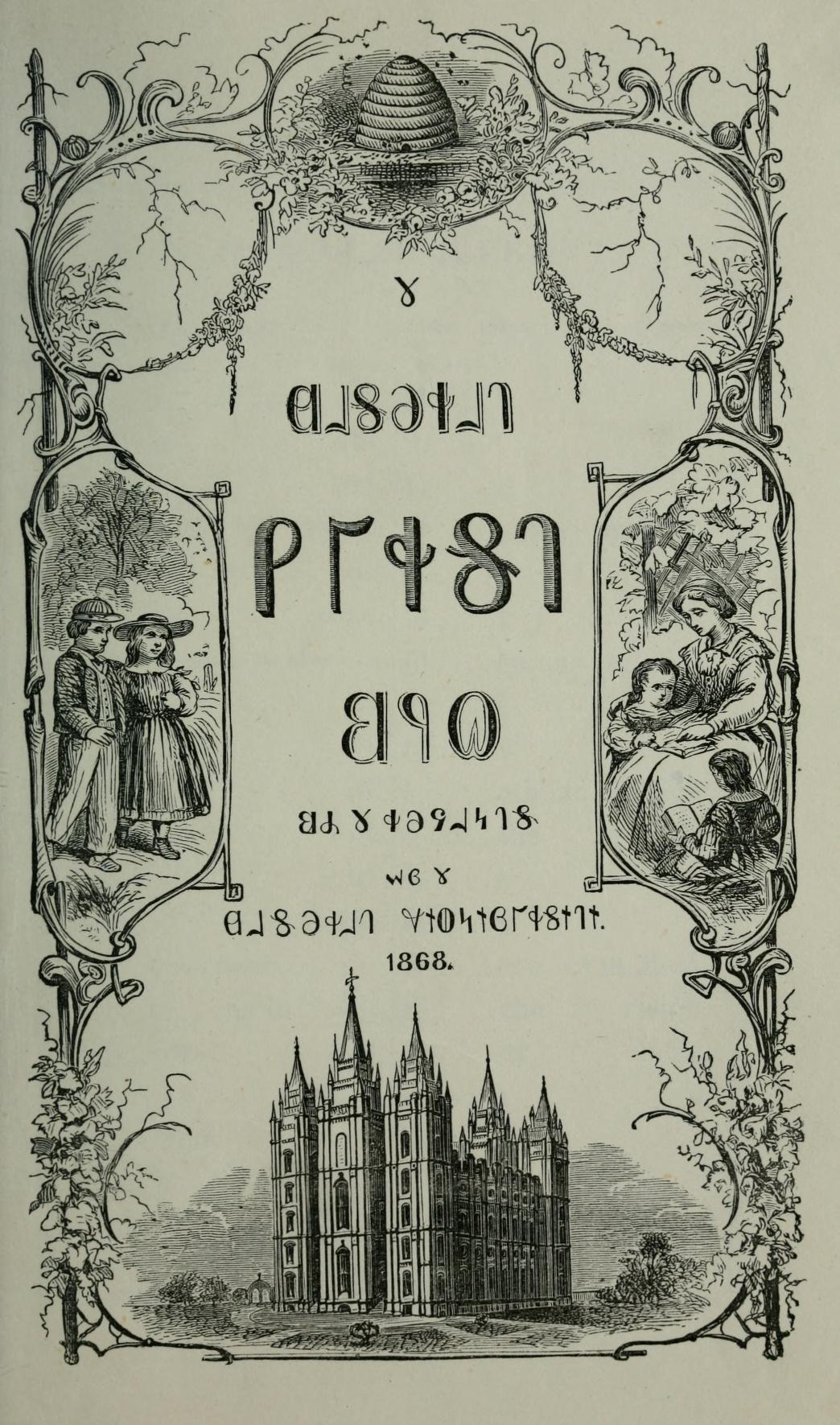
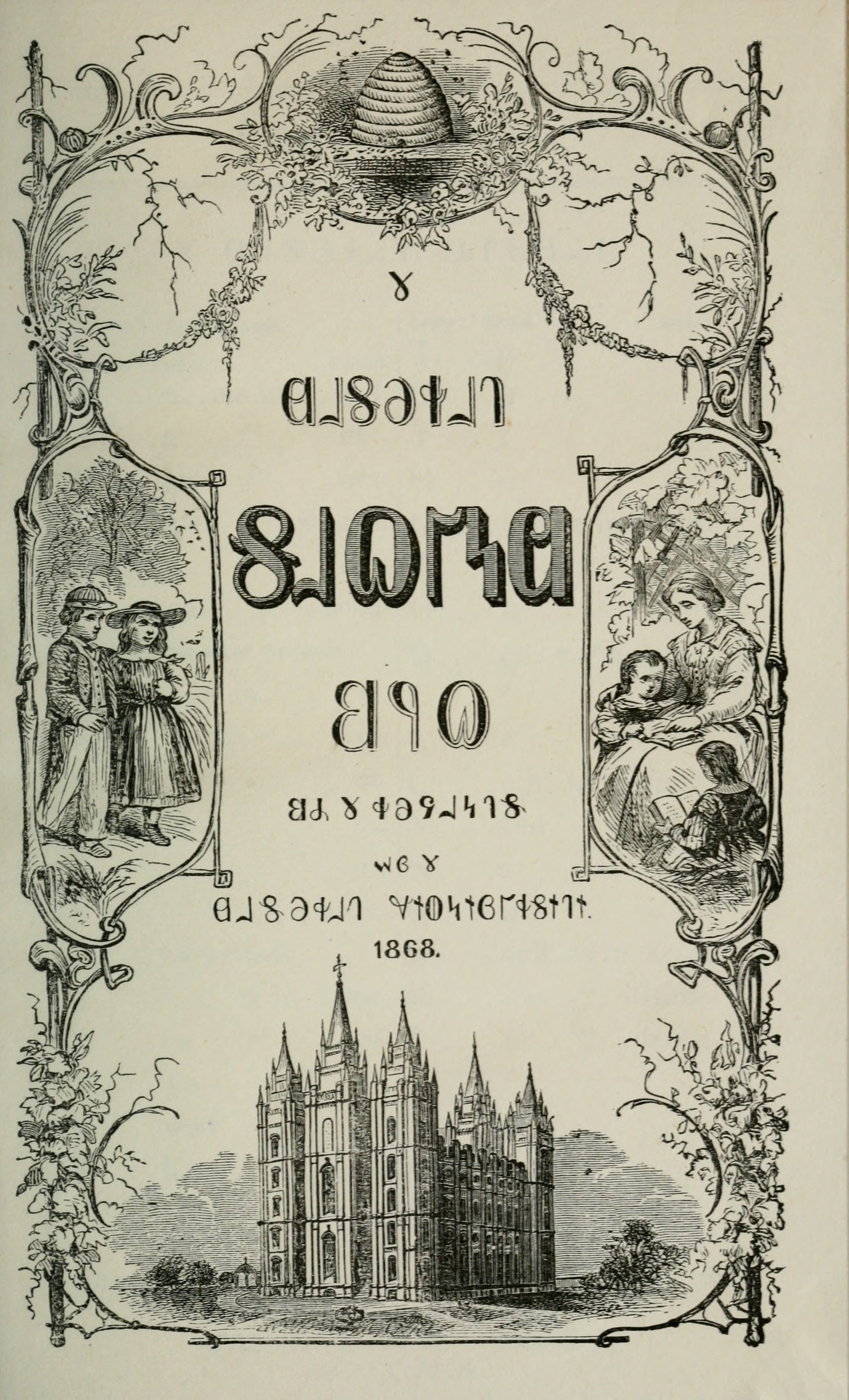
The covers of two primers published in the Deseret alphabet during the life of Brigham Young, the Deseret First Book and the Deseret Second Book.

Their inscriptions read:

𐐜 𐐔𐐇𐐝𐐀𐐡𐐇𐐓 𐐙𐐊𐐡𐐝𐐓/𐐝𐐇𐐗𐐊𐐤𐐔 𐐒𐐋𐐗 𐐒𐐌 𐐜 𐐡𐐀𐐖𐐇𐐤𐐓𐐝 𐐱𐑂 𐑄 𐐔𐐇𐐝𐐀𐐡𐐇𐐓 𐐏𐐆𐐅𐐤𐐆𐐚𐐊𐐡𐐝𐐆𐐓𐐆 1868.

THE DESERET FIRST/SECOND BOOK BY THE REGENTS of the DESERET UNIVERSITY 1868.

Benn Pitman, the brother of Isaac Pitman, was also interested in spelling reform, and by 1864 had published his own orthography, which the board of regents considered adopting. However, they ultimately decided not to and used the opportunity to re-affirm their commitment to the Deseret alphabet.

Brigham Young blamed the failure of this first attempt at reform on the ugliness of the type developed by Ladew & Peer, and so he commissioned Russell's American Steam Printing House, a New York City based font foundry, to design more pleasing type. The result was the Bodoni-esque font (below) that was used to print all of the books in this period. In an 1868 article, the Deseret News wrote that "the characters, to a person unaccustomed to them, may look strange, [but] to the eye to which they are familiar they are beautiful."

At least four books were published in the new alphabet, all transcribed by Orson Pratt and all using the Russell's House font: The First Deseret Alphabet Reader (1868), The Second Deseret Alphabet Reader (1868), The Book of Mormon (1869), and a Book of Mormon excerpt called First Nephi–Omni (1869).

Considerable non-printed material in the Deseret alphabet was made, including a replica headstone in Cedar City, Utah, some coinage, letters, diaries, and meeting minutes. One of the more curious items found in the Deseret alphabet is an English-Hopi dictionary prepared by two Mormon missionaries. The handwritten document sat in the LDS Church Archives, largely ignored until 2014 when writing system researcher and computer scientist Kenneth R. Beesley re-discovered it and transcribed it into standard written English.

=== Decline (1869–1877) ===
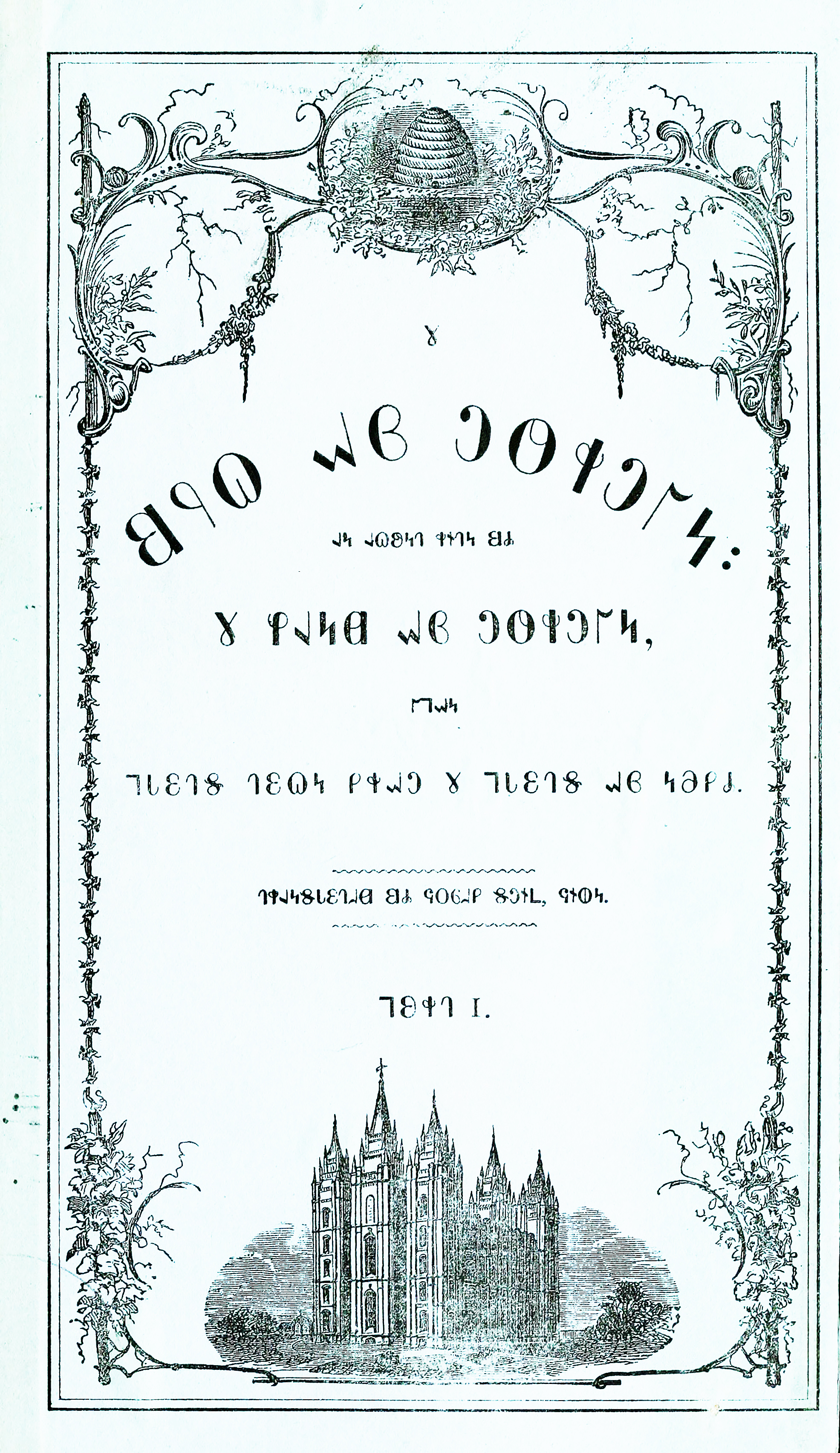
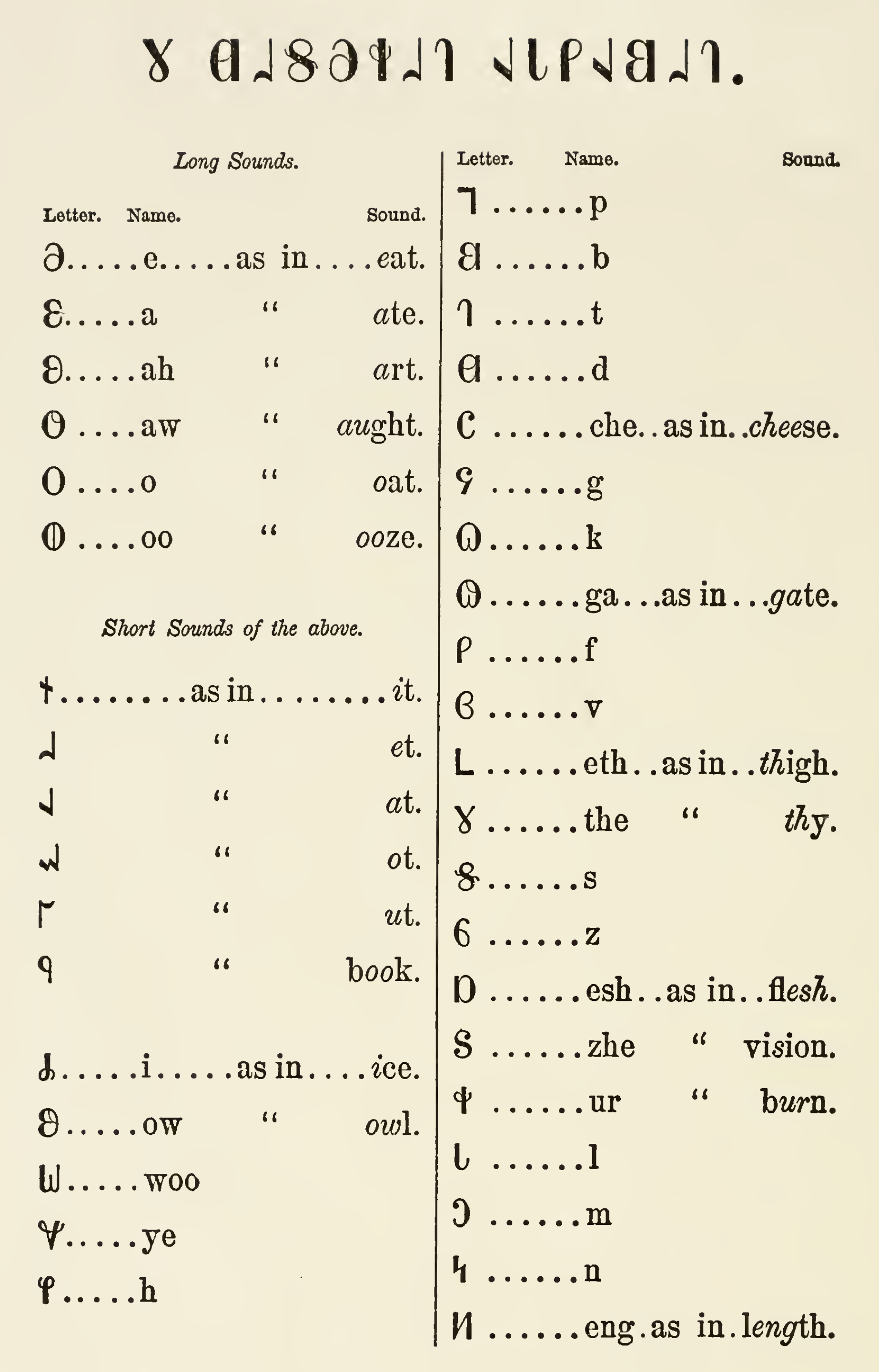
The final book the Mormon pioneers printed in the Deseret alphabet: a three part Book of Mormon. On left, the cover of volume one; on right, the Deseret alphabet chart in the book.

Despite years of heavy promotion, the Deseret alphabet was never widely adopted. This reluctance was partly due to prohibitive costs; the project had already cost the early church $20,000, with $6,000 going to Pratt as remuneration for his transcription effort and most of the rest going to cutting metal type featuring the new alphabet and printing costs. In 1859, Orson Pratt estimated that the cost of supplying all Utah Territory schoolchildren with suitable textbooks would be over $5,000,000.

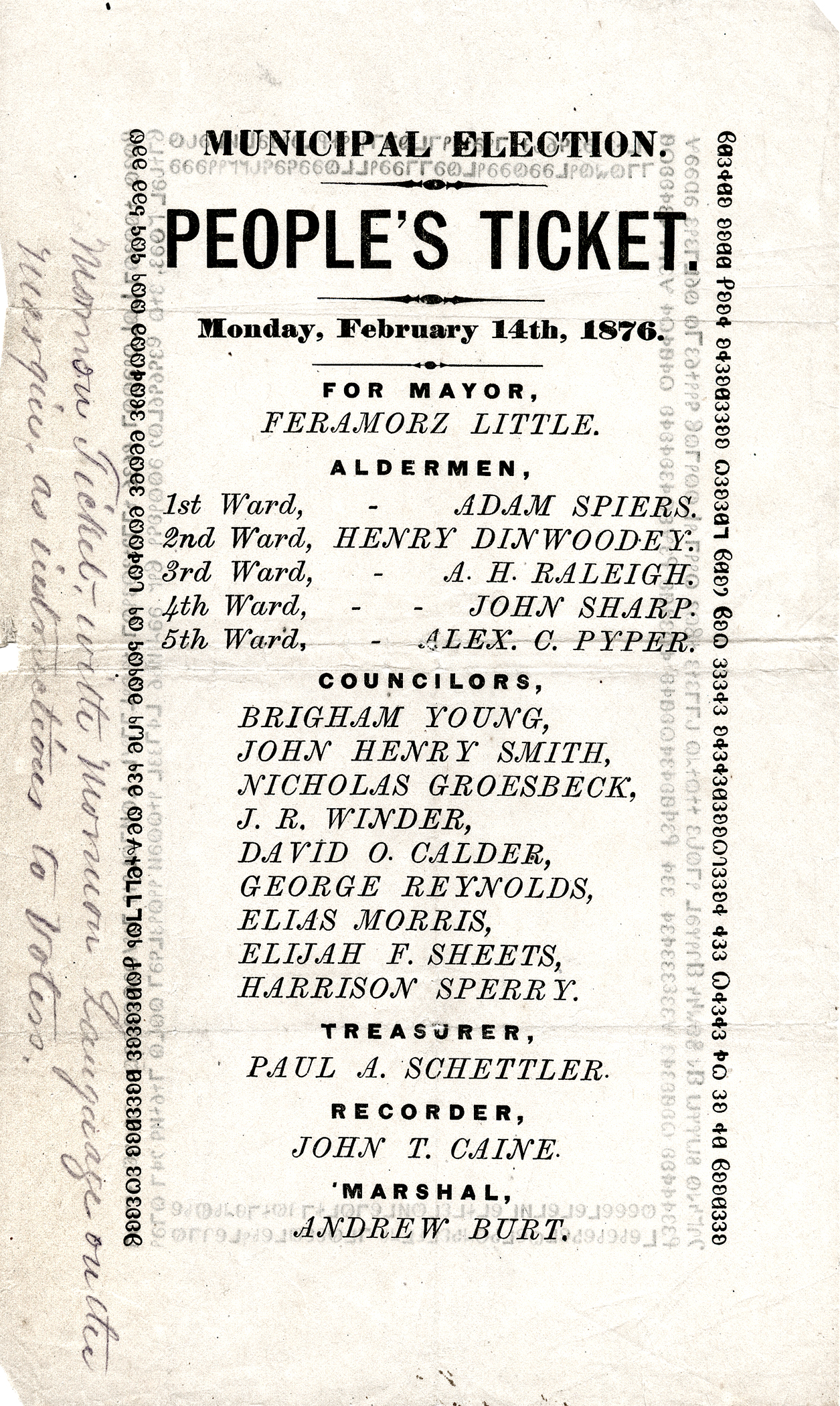
An 1876 campaign ticket for the People's Party of Utah. The Deseret type is recycled to make a border. The "words" in the border are gibberish.

According to Beesley, many have written that interest in the Deseret alphabet died with Brigham Young. This, however, is not true; the alphabet was already regarded as a failure during Young's time. Only 500 copies of the full Book of Mormon translated into the Deseret alphabet sold for $2 each, and even Young realized that the venture was too expensive and even the most devout Mormons could not be convinced to purchase and study the Deseret edition books over the books in the traditional orthography. In the winter of 1870, just one year after their publication, advertisements for the Deseret alphabet books were quietly removed from the Deseret News.

Contemporary writers noted that thousands of copies of the 15¢ and 20¢ Deseret primers went unsold, and historian Roby Wentz speculated that the LDS Church at that time had a "cache" of the primers in mint condition, which it was slowly selling off; according to him, one such primer sold for $250 in 1978.

The Mormons had planned to use the profits from sale of the earlier books to fund printing of more books, and in anticipation Orson Pratt had already transcribed the complete Bible, Doctrine and Covenants, and John Jaques's Catechism for Children. Pratt had also prepared an apparent sequel to the primers, the Deseret Phonetic Speller. After the sales failure, however, none of these books were ever published and were thought lost until being rediscovered in a storage area of the LDS Church Archives in Salt Lake City in May 1967.

Ralph Vigoda, a reporter for The Philadelphia Inquirer, has speculated that the completion of the Transcontinental railroad may have contributed to the alphabet's downfall: non-Mormons, not loyal to Brigham Young, became a large part of the city, and without the religious motivation it would be difficult indeed to get them to learn a new alphabet. In a retrospective piece, historian A. J. Simmonds claims that the new railroad doomed the alphabet. According to him, easy access to "the whole literature of the English speaking world" rendered the alphabet useless.

In July 1877, Young tried one more time at a spelling reform, ordering lead type designed for the orthography of Benn Pitman (Isaac's brother) with the intention of printing an edition of the Book of Mormon and Doctrine and Covenants using it. Most of the type had arrived by August, but with Young's death, the translation was never undertaken and the type never used. Young's death thus marked the end of the Mormon experimentation with English spelling reforms.

=== Rediscovery in the computer era ===
Three questions ("Where is my room?", "Where is the beach?" and "Where is the bar?") in a Deseret digital computer typeface

Modern digital typography has reduced the costs of typesetting substantially, especially for small print runs. Freely licensed Deseret alphabet fonts can be used at no additional cost.

Film director Trent Harris used the Deseret alphabet in his 1994 satire of Mormon theology, Plan 10 from Outer Space, where it features as an alien language used on a mysterious "Plaque of Kolob".

During the 1996 Utah Centennial celebration, an activity book for children was distributed, within which one of the activities was for a child to write their own name in the alphabet. The book says that a child who does this will be "the first kid in 100 years to write [their] name in the Deseret alphabet!"

Also in 1996, Buffalo River Press published a reprint of the Deseret First Book, of which only 10,000 were originally printed. The entire Book of Mormon in the Deseret alphabet has been likewise reprinted, as only 500 copies from the original print run exist, and they can sell on eBay for ≈$7,500 (as of 2004). In 1997, John Jenkins uploaded a free three part PDF of the so-called "triple combination", that is, a combined Book of Mormon, Doctrine and Covenants and Pearl of Great Price.

John Jenkins has gone on to publish many classic pieces of English literature in the Deseret alphabet, such as Alice in Wonderland, Pride and Prejudice, and The Wonderful Wizard of Oz.

Owing to the character set's inclusion in Unicode, most of the original books and many of the original manuscripts have been transcribed into plain text, and, when this is not possible due to discrepancies between the Unicode reference glyphs and the documents, LaTeX.

==== Fonts ====
The phrase "𐐆𐑌𐑁𐐲𐑉𐑋𐐩𐑇𐐲𐑌 𐐶𐐪𐑌𐐻𐑅 𐐻𐐭 𐐺 𐑁𐑉𐐨" (Information wants to be free) in five Deseret fonts. From top, Noto Sans Deseret, QueenBee Star, TuBeeRound, Times Bee and Analecta.

The first digital font for the Deseret alphabet, called "Deseret", was designed by Greg Kearney as part of work he was doing for the LDS Church History Department in 1991; the font was used in an exhibit that year. In August 1995, a cleaned up, digitized version of the font in use in the Deseret Second Book was created by Salt Lake City graphic designer Edward Bateman, who made the font in Fontographer while working on Plan 10 from Outer Space.

Kenneth R. Beesley created a Metafont (and thus, LaTeX-compatible) font called desalph in 2002.

All computers running Microsoft's Windows 7 operating system or newer can display the entire Deseret alphabet Unicode range as the glyphs are included in the Segoe UI Symbol font.

Besides maintaining a Deseret input method for Windows, Joshua Erickson, a UCLA alumnus, also maintains a large collection of freeware Unicode fonts for the alphabet, which he collectively terms the "Bee Fonts".

There also exist free software fonts for the Deseret alphabet. Google, through its Noto Sans project, the aim of which is "to support all languages with a harmonious look and feel", has also released a Deseret font under the name "Noto Sans Deseret". George Douros maintained a public domain font called "Analecta" until 2022 as part of his Unicode Fonts for Ancient Scripts project, which supports the Coptic, Gothic, and Deseret scripts and is still available on archive.org. Deseret glyphs are also available in the popular pan-Unicode fonts Code2001 and Everson Mono (as of version 5.1.5).

== Alphabet ==
Although the Deseret alphabet has letter case, usually the only difference between the minuscule and majuscule forms is that the majuscule forms are larger.

Glyph	Name		Glyph	Name		Glyph	Name		Glyph	Name	
𐐀 𐐨	Long I	/iː/	𐐊 𐐲	Short O	/ʌ/	𐐔 𐐼	Dee	/d/	𐐞 𐑆	Zee	/z/
𐐁 𐐩	Long E	/eɪ/	𐐋 𐐳	Short Oo	/ʊ/	𐐕 𐐽	Chee	/tʃ/	𐐟 𐑇	Esh	/ʃ/
𐐂 𐐪	Long A	/ɑː/	𐐌 𐐴	Ay	/aɪ/	𐐖 𐐾	Jee	/dʒ/	𐐠 𐑈	Zhee	/ʒ/
𐐃 𐐫	Long Ah	/ɔː/	𐐍 𐐵	Ow	/aʊ/	𐐗 𐐿	Kay	/k/	𐐡 𐑉	Er	/r/
𐐄 𐐬	Long O	/oʊ/	𐐎 𐐶	Wu	/w/	𐐘 𐑀	Gay	/ɡ/	𐐢 𐑊	El	/l/
𐐅 𐐭	Long Oo	/uː/	𐐏 𐐷	Yee	/j/	𐐙 𐑁	Ef	/f/	𐐣 𐑋	Em	/m/
𐐆 𐐮	Short I	/ɪ/	𐐐 𐐸	H	/h/	𐐚 𐑂	Vee	/v/	𐐤 𐑌	En	/n/
𐐇 𐐯	Short E	/ɛ/	𐐑 𐐹	Pee	/p/	𐐛 𐑃	Eth	/θ/	𐐥 𐑍	Eng	/ŋ/
𐐈 𐐰	Short A	/æ/	𐐒 𐐺	Bee	/b/	𐐜 𐑄	Thee	/ð/	𐐦 𐑎	Oi*	/ɔɪ/
𐐉 𐐱	Short Ah	/ɒ/	𐐓 𐐻	Tee	/t/	𐐝 𐑅	Es	/s/	𐐧 𐑏	Ew*	/juː/
*Not part of original alphabet; see § Versions below

A degree of free spelling is allowed to accommodate dialectal differences in English. For example, in the Deseret edition of The Book of Mormon, the word "wherefore" is written as 𐐸𐐶𐐩𐑉𐑁𐐬𐑉 (/hwɛərfoʊr/), which means that the translator of the book did not exhibit the wine–whine merger. Those who do exhibit the merger might instead prefer the spelling 𐐶𐐯𐑉𐑁𐐬𐑉 to match the pronunciation (/wɛrfoʊr/), or, depending on dialect, perhaps 𐐶𐐯𐑉𐑁𐐫𐑉 (/wɛrfɔːr/).

The alphabet was designed to be able to write all of the vowels used in the dialect spoken in 19th century Utah. The vowel inventory has also been attributed to the fact that, unlike other American pioneers, the Mormon pioneers were from New England as opposed to the American South. As such, many of the vowels in the Deseret alphabet have since merged in the modern era: they are no longer distinguished in some dialects of English, particularly dialects of US English, though are still present in others, such as many varieties of British English.

Speakers who exhibit the father–bother merger no longer distinguish /ɑː/ (𐐪) and /ɒ/ (𐐱), and so both "father" and "bother" would be written with 𐐪: as 𐑁𐐪𐑄𐐲𐑉 and 𐐺𐐪𐑄𐐲𐑉 as opposed to 𐑁𐐪𐑄𐐲𐑉 and 𐐺𐐱𐑄𐐲𐑉. For those with the cot–caught merger, /ɔː/ (𐐫) and /ɒ/ (𐐱) are no longer distinguished: both "cot" and "caught" are thus written by them as 𐐿𐐱𐐻 (/kɒt/) in the case of North American English, and as 𐐿𐐫𐐻 (/kɔːt/) in the case of Scottish English. For those exhibiting both mergers, both would be written 𐐿𐐪𐐻 (/kɑːt/).

=== Versions ===
There have been several published versions of the alphabet. Most versions (including the versions used in The Deseret First Book, The Deseret Second Book, The Deseret News and The Book of Mormon) had only 38 letters, but some versions contained two ligatures, 𐐧 (ew) and 𐐦 (oi). In place of 𐐮𐐭 or 𐐷𐐭, 𐑏 was to be used; in place of 𐐱𐐮, 𐑎.

In the 23 February 1859 edition of the Deseret News, the editors announced their approval of the two new letters and eventual intention to use them in the newsletter. However, due to the hot metal typesetting technology in use at the time, casting the new letters for use would have been a considerable expense, so it was never realized.

=== Representation of [ə] ===
The Deseret alphabet does not have a distinct symbol for the mid central vowel ([ə], "schwa"). The lack of a schwa has been cited as the biggest "phonological flaw" in the alphabet.

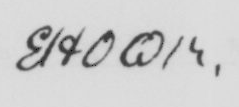
Shelton using his schwa to handwrite the word "broken" (𐐺𐑉𐐬𐐿ı𐑌) (/ˈbroʊkən/). The standard way to render this word is 𐐺𐑉𐐬𐐿𐑌 (/ˈbroʊkn/).

Because of the lack of a schwa, the author must write the sound that would be used if the syllable was stressed. For example, the word enough is commonly pronounced /əˈnʌf/, but when it is stressed (as in a declaration of irritation) it is pronounced /iˈnʌf/. The Deseret spelling of the word, 𐐨𐑌𐐲𐑁, reflects that stressed pronunciation. If [ə] does not have an inherent stressed value in a word, as is often the case before /r/, then it is written as 𐐲.

Marion Jackson Shelton, an early Mormon missionary, proposed the addition of a new glyph to represent the schwa, a simple vertical line of the same height as other Deseret characters with a similar appearance to the Turkish dotless i (ı). The addition of this glyph did not catch on among his contemporaries, however, and no document outside of ones penned by Shelton makes use of it. Shelton used the new glyph in an 1860 letter to Brigham Young reporting on a recently completed mission to the Paiute people.

=== Syllabic values ===
Each letter in the Deseret alphabet has a name, and when a letter is written on its own it has the value of that name. This allows some short words to be written with a single letter, and is called a letter's "syllabic value". The most common word in English, the, is written simply 𐑄, as the letter's name is /ðiː/ and that is the stressed pronunciation of the word. The consonants with syllabic values are 𐐶 (woo), 𐐷 (yee), 𐐸 (ha), 𐐹 (pee), 𐐺 (be/bee), 𐐻 (tee/tea), 𐐽 (qi), 𐐾 (jee), 𐑀 (gay), and 𐑄 (the/thee).

Syllabic values do not apply within words, although this was formerly the case. In early documents, Watt writes "people" as 𐐹𐐹𐑊 with the expectation that readers will interpret the first 𐐹 as /piː/, but the second 𐐹 as /p/. This contextual value switching was soon done away with, so in later documents, while "bee" is written 𐐺, "bees" is written 𐐺𐐨𐑆.

In 40-letter versions of the alphabet which include the letter 𐐧 (ew) which represents /juː/, the letter 𐐧 when standing alone can be used to represent the word "you".

== Examples ==
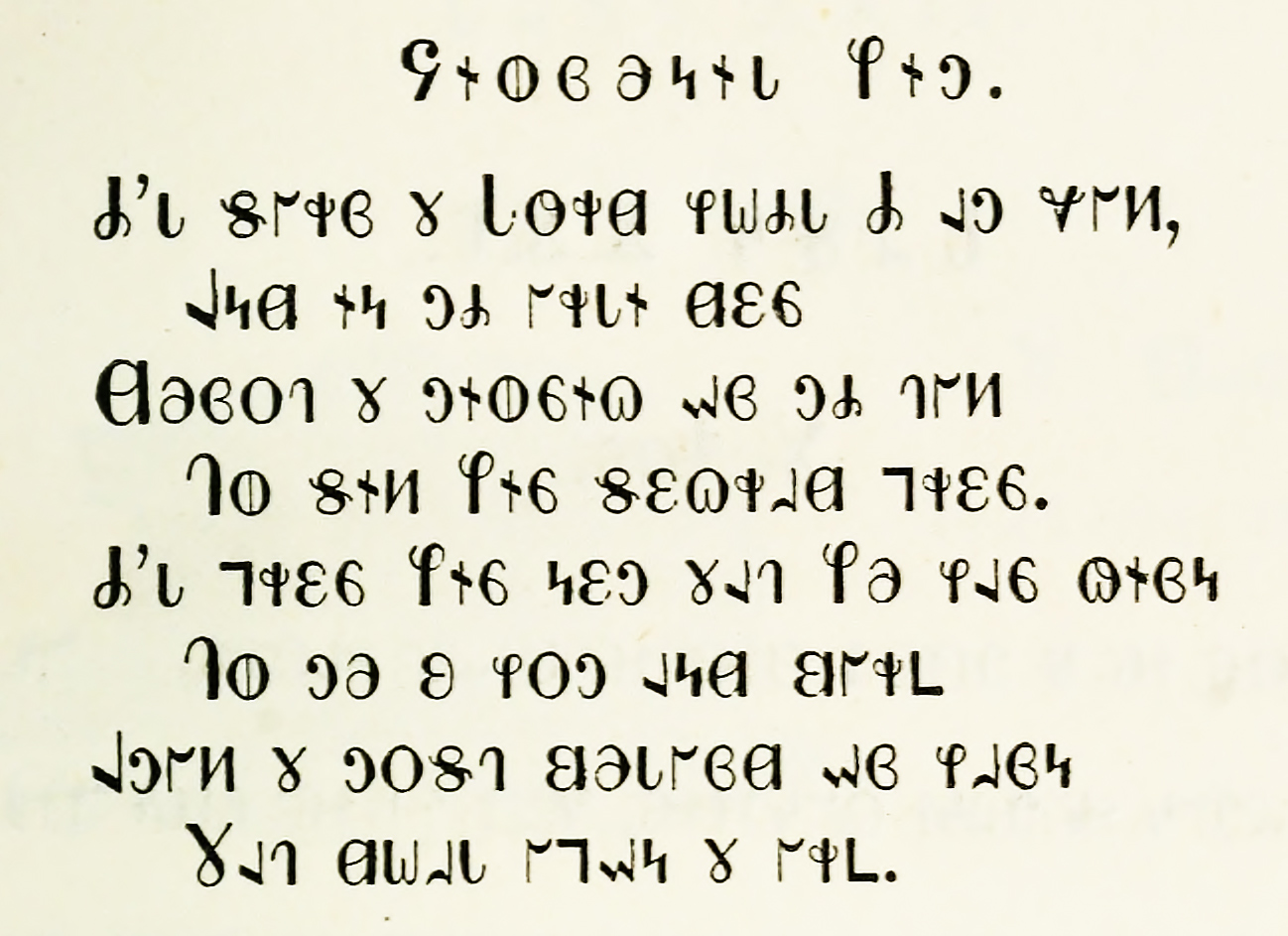
- Hymn from the Deseret Second Book, printed in 1868. The first line of the hymn reads "I'll serve the Lord while I am young" (𐐌'𐑊 𐑅𐐲𐑉𐑂 𐑄 𐐢𐐫𐑉𐐼 𐐸𐐶𐐴𐑊 𐐌 𐐰𐑋 𐐷𐐲𐑍), and is pronounced as /aɪl sʌrv ð(ə) lɔːrd hwaɪl aɪ æm jʌŋ/.
  – Hello, how are you? – I'm doing great, thanks! – It was nice seeing you, but I've got to run! Take care!
  - – 𐐐𐐯𐑊𐐬, 𐐸𐐵 𐐪𐑉 𐑏? – 𐐌'𐑋 𐐼𐐭𐐮𐑍 𐑀𐑉𐐩𐐻, 𐑃𐐰𐑍𐐿𐑅! – 𐐆𐐻 𐐶𐐲𐑆 𐑌𐐴𐑅 𐑅𐐨𐐨𐑍 𐑏, 𐐺𐐲𐐻 𐐌'𐑂 𐑀𐐪𐐻 𐐻𐐭 𐑉𐐲𐑌! 𐐓𐐩𐐿 𐐿𐐯𐑉!
- Oil floats on water, but mercury sinks below both. This is due to their relative densities.
  - 𐐦𐑊 𐑁𐑊𐐬𐐻𐑅 𐐪𐑌 𐐶𐐫𐐻𐐲𐑉, 𐐺𐐲𐐻 𐑋𐐲𐑉𐐿𐐷𐐲𐑉𐐨 𐑅𐐮𐑍𐐿𐑅 𐐺𐐮𐑊𐐬 𐐺𐐬𐑃. 𐐜𐐮𐑅 𐐮𐑆 𐐼𐐭 𐐻𐐭 𐑄𐐯𐑉 𐑉𐐯𐑊𐐲𐐻𐐮𐑂 𐐼𐐯𐑌𐑅𐐮𐐻𐐨𐑆.

The first lesson in the Deseret First Book reads simply:

LESSON I.

I am in.
As we go.
On to it.

Translation:

𐐢𐐇𐐝𐐤 I.

𐐌 𐐰𐑋 𐐮𐑌.
𐐈𐑆 𐐶𐐨 𐑀𐐬.
𐐉𐑌 𐐻𐐭 𐐮𐐻.

In the Deseret Second Book, there is a version of Twinkle, Twinkle, Little Star on page 19:

LESSON XVI.
The Little Star

Twinkle, twinkle, little star,
How I wonder what you are.
Up above the world so high,
Like a diamond in the sky.

When the blazing sun is set,
And the grass with dew is wet,
Then you show your little light;
Twinkle, twinkle, all the night.

Then if I were in the dark,
I would thank you for your spark;
I could not see which way to go,
If you did not twinkle so.

And when I am sound asleep,
Oft you through my window peep,
For you never shut your eye
Til the sun is in the sky.

Translation:

𐐢𐐇𐐝𐐤 XVI.
𐐜 𐐢𐐮𐐻𐑊 𐐝𐐻𐐪𐑉.

𐐓𐐶𐐮𐑍𐐿𐑊, 𐐻𐐶𐐮𐑍𐐿𐑊, 𐑊𐐮𐐻𐑊 𐑅𐐻𐐪𐑉,
𐐐𐐵 𐐌 𐐶𐐲𐑌𐐼𐐯𐑉 𐐸𐐶𐐱𐐻 𐐷𐐭 𐐪𐑉.
𐐊𐐹 𐐰𐐺𐐲𐑂 𐑄 𐐶𐐲𐑉𐑊𐐼 𐑅𐐬 𐐸𐐴,
𐐢𐐴𐐿 𐐪 𐐼𐐴𐑋𐐲𐑌𐐼 𐐮𐑌 𐑄 𐑅𐐿𐐴.

𐐐𐐶𐐯𐑌 𐑄 𐐺𐑊𐐩𐑆𐐮𐑍 𐑅𐐲𐑌 𐐮𐑆 𐑅𐐯𐐻,
𐐈𐑌𐐼 𐑄 𐑀𐑉𐐪𐑅 𐐶𐐮𐑄 𐐼𐐮𐐭 𐐮𐑆 𐐶𐐯𐐻,
𐐜𐐯𐑌 𐐷𐐭 𐑇𐐬 𐐷𐐭𐑉 𐑊𐐮𐐻𐑊 𐑊𐐴𐐻;
𐐓𐐶𐐮𐑍𐐿𐑊, 𐐻𐐶𐐮𐑍𐐿𐑊, 𐐫𐑊 𐑄 𐑌𐐴𐐻.

𐐜𐐯𐑌 𐐮𐑁 𐐌 𐐶𐐲𐑉 𐐮𐑌 𐑄 𐐼𐐪𐑉𐐿,
𐐌 𐐶𐐳𐐼 𐑃𐐰𐑍𐐿 𐐷𐐭 𐑁𐐫𐑉 𐐷𐐭𐑉 𐑅𐐹𐐪𐑉𐐿;
𐐌 𐐿𐐳𐐼 𐑌𐐱𐐻 𐑅𐐨 𐐸𐐶𐐮𐐽 𐐶𐐩 𐐻𐐭 𐑀𐐬,
𐐆𐑁 𐐷𐐭 𐐼𐐮𐐼 𐑌𐐱𐐻 𐐻𐐶𐐮𐑍𐐿𐑊 𐑅𐐬.

𐐈𐑌𐐼 𐐸𐐶𐐯𐑌 𐐌 𐐰𐑋 𐑅𐐵𐑌𐐼 𐐰𐑅𐑊𐐨𐐹,
𐐉𐑁𐐻 𐐷𐐭 𐑃𐑉𐐭 𐑋𐐴 𐐶𐐮𐑌𐐼𐐬 𐐹𐐨𐐹,
𐐙𐐫𐑉 𐐷𐐭 𐑌𐐯𐑂𐐯𐑉 𐑇𐐲𐐻 𐐷𐐭𐑉 𐐴
𐐓𐐮𐑊 𐑄 𐑅𐐲𐑌 𐐮𐑆 𐐮𐑌 𐑄 𐑅𐐿𐐴.

== Handwriting ==
There were two main handwritten forms of the Deseret alphabet: a cursive version and a printed version. Over the lifetime of the alphabet, the cursive form fell out of favor among most users of the alphabet and by 1856 no more cursive documents exist. Its impact on the glyphs can however still be plainly seen in the loops of certain characters such as 𐑅, 𐑀 and 𐐼. The earliest surviving versions of the Deseret alphabet, from 1853 (one year before its January 1854 approval), have printed and cursive forms side-by-side, suggesting that a cursive form was part of the plan from the very beginning.

=== Cursive ===
Wikipedia, the free encyclopedia that anyone can edit 𐐎𐐮𐐿𐐨𐐹𐐨𐐼𐐨𐐲, 𐑄 𐑁𐑉𐐨 𐐯𐑌𐑅𐐴𐐿𐑊𐐬𐐹𐐨𐐼𐐨𐐲 𐑄𐐰𐐻 𐐯𐑌𐐨𐐶𐐲𐑌 𐐿𐐰𐑌 𐐯𐐼𐐮𐐻

The cursive form of the Deseret alphabet was mainly used by two people: George D. Watt, and James Henry Martineau. Watt, a stenographer, recorded several bishops meetings and wrote other personal documents in this cursive style. A chart of the cursive form appears below. The blue glyphs represent how to write each character, while the top row of printed glyphs shows the corresponding Unicode reference glyph.

The cursive style has many unorthodox characteristics uncommon to alphabetic writing systems. Vowels can be dropped if the writer is in a hurry and feels the word is obvious as in an abjad, letters can be written above or below the base line depending on what precedes them, and 𐐮 is placed on letters after they are already written as in an abugida. Furthermore, unlike the typeset alphabet, the cursive alphabet has no letter case. These characteristics could have arisen because Watt was a local expert in Pitman shorthand, which is written in a similar way.

The table below shows some examples of how the cursive form is written. Dropped vowels are marked in parentheses.

=== Block letters ===
George D. Watt found his own alphabet cumbersome to write and abandoned it. As he wrote to Brigham Young on 21 August 1854:

Dear Bro. I herein submit for your examination the result of much thought and extensive practice on the new alphabet since the Board of Regents last met. I candidly confess that I never did like the present construction of the alphabet. I was not left as free as I could have wished to be in the construction of it. [...] I am now thoroughly convinced that it is not the most expeditious method of writing and printing, but on the contrary it retards the hand in its onward course.

His new alphabet closely resembled an 1853 publication of Isaac Pitman, containing only 33 letters. However, at this point, Young was still enamored with the original Deseret alphabet, and so he rejected the proposal and Watt continued to publicly promote the alphabet as part of his job despite his reservations.

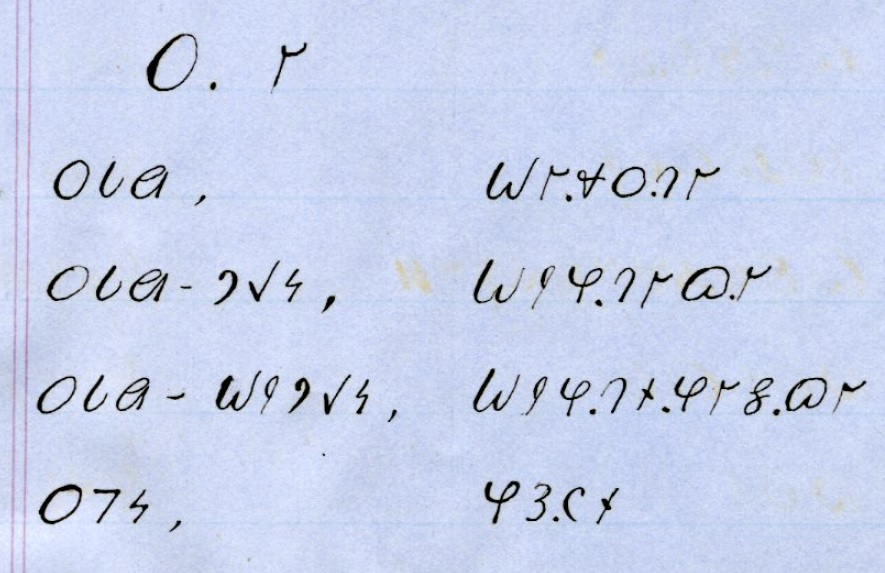
A fragment of Marion Shelton's Hopi dictionary, the source of his handwriting. This section shows translations into the Hopi language (Orayvi dialect) for words that start with the English phoneme /oʊ/.

After 1855, no more cursive documents appear, and all surviving journals are written in block letters. Marion J. Shelton, an early Mormon missionary who wrote a dictionary of the Hopi language in the alphabet, was a "typical" 40-letter Deseret writer, and his style of writing is shown below.

== Design criticism ==
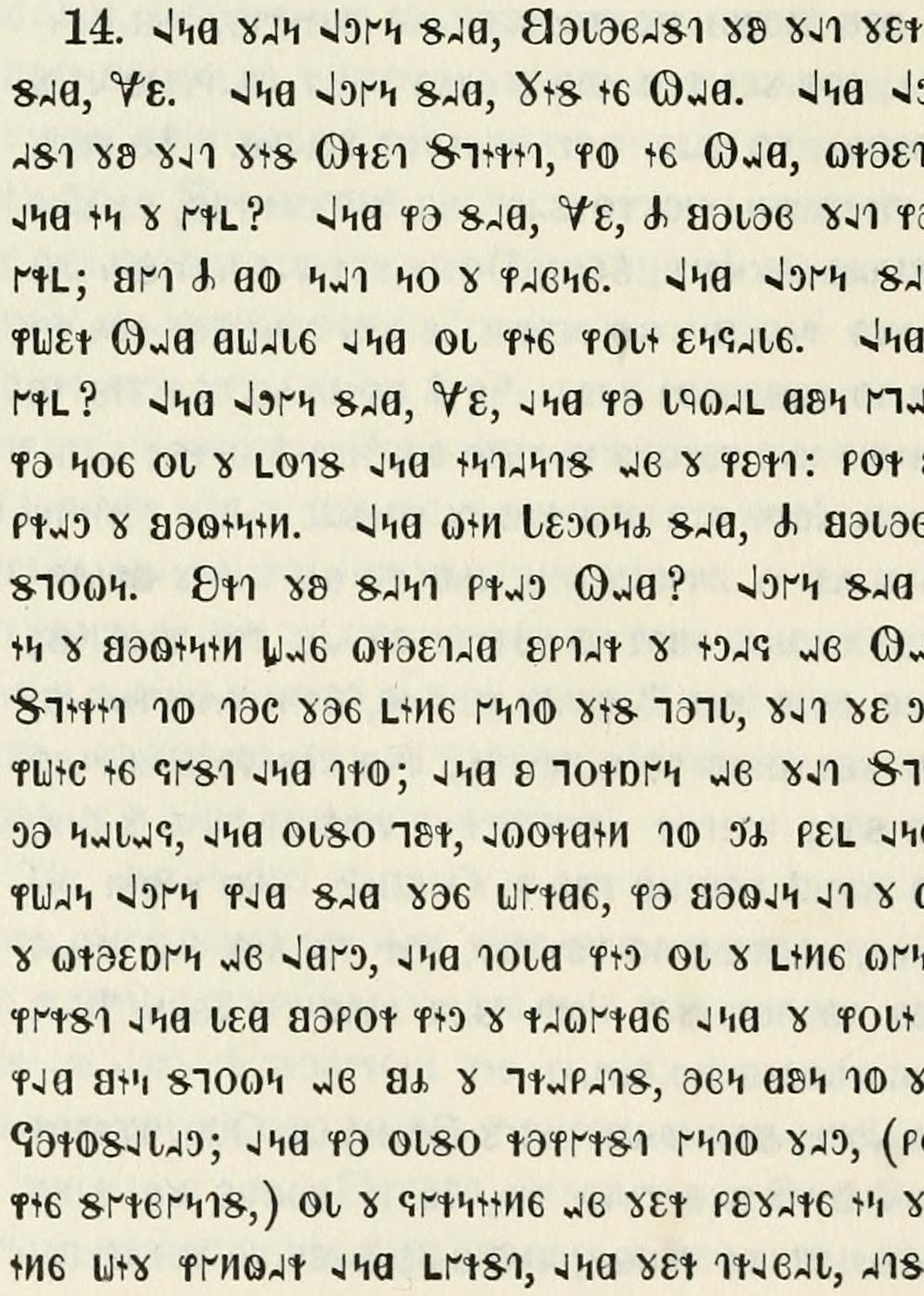
Text from the Book of Alma

Old Turkic inscription

The Deseret alphabet was purposely designed so as to not have ascenders and descenders. This was envisioned as a practical benefit for the alphabet in an era of metal type: after many uses, the edges of type sorts become dull, and narrow ascenders and descenders are most prone to this effect.

While well intentioned, this lack has been described as a "catastrophic" mistake that makes type look "monotonous" and makes all words look alike. Some have joked that this aesthetic quality could cause the new alphabet to be mistaken from afar for a Turkish tax list.

The Mormon pioneers were apparently aware of the problems caused by its monotony:

President Young has decided that [the letters] are not so well adapted for the purpose designed as it was hoped they would be. There being no shanks (ascenders or descenders) to the letters, all being very even, they are trying to the eye, because of their uniformity.

— article in the Juvenile Instructor, 2 October 1875

Other criticism of the design was harsher still. In an 18 December 1857 editorial in the Boston Globe, the alphabet was described as being "so arranged and named as to cause the greatest possible annoyance to outsiders" and the design of the letters as "incomprehensible as [...] the hieroglyphics of the [...] Egyptians." On 4 March 1872, The New York Times called the alphabet "rude, awkward and cumbersome".

Some modern computer fonts and printed books have attempted to correct this perceived fault: in the books in John Jenkins' Deseret Alphabet Classics series, the font used adds a descender to 𐑉 and 𐐻 and an ascender to 𐐼 and 𐑇 among other tweaks.

== Other motives ==
Officially, the Deseret alphabet was created to simplify the spelling of English words for the benefit of children and English as a second language learners. Some of the alphabet's contemporaries, however, posited an alternative motivation for its development: increasing the isolation of the early Mormons.

=== Restricting access to religious texts and internal communications ===
The charge that the Deseret alphabet's main purpose was to keep outsiders in the dark was brought almost immediately, as evidenced by the following 1858 Lyttelton Times reprint of an unnamed "New York newspaper":

Mormon Secretiveness.—The new "Deseret Alphabet" is completed, and a fount of pica type has been cast in St. Louis. Specimens of the type are published in the St. Louis papers, but they are unproducible in types that common people use [...] The ukases of Brother Brigham will hereafter be a sealed letter, literally, to Gentile eyes.

Having obtained a copy of the Deseret News in 1859, the Richmond Dispatch disparaged it on April 25, writing "The Deseret News is filled with a lot of hieroglyphs. It seems to be [an alphabet] which the Mormons alone are to be taught."

However, some modern historians doubt the veracity of this theory. For one, notes Kenneth R. Beesley, the Deseret News and every book published in the alphabet prominently features the key to the alphabet, and anyone without a key could have gotten a copy of A Journey to Great-Salt-Lake City, or traveled to Salt Lake City themselves and bought one. Contemporary scholars Richard F. Burton and Jules Remy also dismissed the secrecy argument, in 1860 and 1855 respectively.

=== Limitations on exposure to external publications among early Latter-day Saints ===
With the impending completion of the Transcontinental Railroad, Mormons would have easy, cheap access to publications from the east, including yellowbacks, penny dreadfuls, pulp magazines, and other, often scandalous or "dirty" publications, that were rising to prominence in the 19th century. In an article about the benefits of the alphabet, the Deseret News proudly wrote:

If our community were situated as others are, it might be Quixotic to attempt the introduction of this reform among us with the hope of carrying it into practical operation. But our position is unique, we are united. [...] Some have an idea that if a child be educated in the system of spelling and writing by sound it will be a detriment to it in learning the present system. [...] If they could find no better reading than much of the miserable trash that now obtains extensive circulation, it would be better if they never learned to read the present orthography. In such a case ignorance would be blissful. [...] The greatest evils which now flourish and under which Christendom groans are directly traceable to the licentiousness of the press.

— "The Deseret Alphabet—Its Advantages", 19 August 1868, Deseret News

In another article, the Deseret News cited an example of the kind of literature Mormons would benefit from not being able to read: The Police Gazette. Historians A. J. Simmonds and Roby Wentz contend that while this may have been a tertiary goal of the alphabet, a sort of "happy accident", the main purpose of it was simple orthographic reform. Simmonds notes that the teaching of English to foreigners was not a mere hypothetical to mask isolationist tendencies: 35% of the Utah Territory's population at the time was Scandinavian, with German, Italian and Welsh speaking people also making up a considerable percentage of inhabitants; therefore, communication between the recently baptized and the community was a real problem.

== Encodings ==
Between 1855 and 1859, the way most people wrote the letters 𐑏 and 𐑎 changed, causing encoding problems when attempting to transcribe documents using the latter glyphs with Unicode.

The Deseret alphabet (U+10400–U+1044F) was added to the Unicode Standard in March 2001 with the release of version 3.1, after a request by John H. Jenkins of Apple, making it one of the first scripts to be added outside of the Basic Multilingual Plane. The letters 𐐧 (ew) and 𐐦 (oi) were added to the Unicode Standard in April 2003 with the release of version 4.0.

According to Kenneth R. Beesley, who submitted the proposal to expand the encoding, "Unicode fonts based on the current heterogeneous collection of glyphs will be useless for any practical typesetting of 40-letter Deseret Alphabet documents." This is because the Unicode Consortium chose to use glyphs from 1855 as the reference glyphs, while by 1859 those glyphs were already outmoded and replaced with newer glyphs. Beesley thus recommends using LaTeX along with his Metafont desalph font to typeset Deseret text, but fonts which use the alternate glyphs for the two codepoints in question would also work for transcription of 40-letter Deseret texts written during and after 1859.

Deseret^{[1]} Official Unicode Consortium code chart (PDF)
	0	1	2	3	4	5	6	7	8	9	A	B	C	D	E	F
U+1040x	𐐀	𐐁	𐐂	𐐃	𐐄	𐐅	𐐆	𐐇	𐐈	𐐉	𐐊	𐐋	𐐌	𐐍	𐐎	𐐏
U+1041x	𐐐	𐐑	𐐒	𐐓	𐐔	𐐕	𐐖	𐐗	𐐘	𐐙	𐐚	𐐛	𐐜	𐐝	𐐞	𐐟
U+1042x	𐐠	𐐡	𐐢	𐐣	𐐤	𐐥	𐐦	𐐧	𐐨	𐐩	𐐪	𐐫	𐐬	𐐭	𐐮	𐐯
U+1043x	𐐰	𐐱	𐐲	𐐳	𐐴	𐐵	𐐶	𐐷	𐐸	𐐹	𐐺	𐐻	𐐼	𐐽	𐐾	𐐿
U+1044x	𐑀	𐑁	𐑂	𐑃	𐑄	𐑅	𐑆	𐑇	𐑈	𐑉	𐑊	𐑋	𐑌	𐑍	𐑎	𐑏
Notes 1.As of Unicode version 18.0

On 25 February 2016, the Library of Congress approved an ALA-LC romanization for the Deseret alphabet. The table can be used to display approximations of titles in non-Latin scripts using the Latin alphabet for use in library catalogs that do not support non-Latin alphabets.

== See also ==
- International Phonetic Alphabet
- Shavian Alphabet
