= Journal of Discourses =

Collection of public sermons by early LDS leaders

The Journal of Discourses (often abbreviated J.D.) is a 26-volume collection of public sermons by early leaders of the Church of Jesus Christ of Latter-day Saints (LDS Church). The first editions of the Journal were published in England by George D. Watt, the stenographer of Brigham Young. Publication began in 1854, with the approval and endorsement of the church's First Presidency, and ended in 1886. The Journal is one of the richest sources of early Latter-day Saint theology and thinking. It includes 1,438 sermons given by 55 church leaders, including most numerously Brigham Young, John Taylor, Orson Pratt, Heber C. Kimball, and George Q. Cannon.

== History ==
The Journal was the proposal of George D. Watt, who was Brigham Young's stenographer. Watt had recorded several early sermons in Pitman shorthand, and proposed to the LDS Church that this and other material be published, with printing to be done in England where printing costs were cheaper. The church's First Presidency immediately approved the idea, and officially granted Watt the privilege of preparing and publishing them. Watt recorded the material in the first four volumes of sermons himself, and he continued to contribute through volume twelve, but at least eleven other stenographers were involved.

After recording the sermons, Watt transcribed them and sent them to the speaker for careful review. By far, Young has the most sermons recorded in the Journal, with 390. It was said that:

Brigham Young secured stenographic reports of his addresses. As he traveled among the people, reporters accompanied him. All that he said was recorded. Practically all of these discourses (from December 16, 1851 to August 19, 1877) were published in the Journal of Discourses, which was widely distributed. The public utterances of few great historical figures have been so faithfully and fully preserved.

For at least the first volume, Young personally edited his own sermons. For future volumes, Young helped to select which sermons should be included in the publication, and he assigned his personal secretary to carefully copy-edit the manuscript pages before publication.

=== Full title ===
The full title of the journal was inconsistent across volumes. The title of the first volume was, Journal of Discourses by Brigham Young, President of the Church of Jesus Christ of Latter-day Saints, His Two Counsellors, the Twelve Apostles, and Others. In volume 6, the title was shortened to Journal of Discourses by President Brigham Young, His Two Counsellors, the Twelve Apostles, and Others. In some of the first 19 volumes, the word "Delivered" was added to the title to precede the word "by". Some of these volumes omitted the words "and Others" and some replaced the phrase "His Two Counsellors" with "His Counselors".

Volume 20 was the first published after the death of Brigham Young, and the title used was Journal of Discourses by President John Taylor and Other Members of the Quorum of the Twelve Apostles. Also, Remarks by Other Prominent Elders. Volume 21—published after John Taylor had been ordained as Young's successor to the office of President of the Church—adopted the title Journal of Discourses by President John Taylor, His Counsellors, the Twelve Apostles, and Others, which remained consistent until the final 26th volume.

== Impact ==
The Journal was highly esteemed in its day and considered to be an authoritative source of Latter-day Saint teachings. The preface to the 8th volume, written by apostle George Q. Cannon in 1861, stated:

The Journal of Discourses deservedly ranks as one of the standard works of the Church, and every rightminded Saint will certainly welcome with joy every Number as it comes forth from the press as an additional reflector of 'the light that shines from Zion's hill.

Although it was privately printed, the Journal of Discourses was considered to be an official publication of the LDS Church. However, its contents were not always considered to be official statements of doctrine. The church currently states that the publication is not an official church publication. In distancing itself from the work, it has encouraged its members to focus instead on canonized scripture.

The Journal of Discourses is often relied upon by Mormon fundamentalists to justify their beliefs.

== See also ==
- List of Latter Day Saint periodicals

== Notes ==
=== Bibliography ===
- Watt, Ronald G. (2007). "The beginnings of "The Journal of Discourses" : a confrontation between George D. Watt and Willard Richards". Utah Historical Quarterly. 75 (2): 134–148. Archived from the original on 2013-10-21.
