= Jane Bragg Pitman =

Reporter and wood engraver (1825–1877)

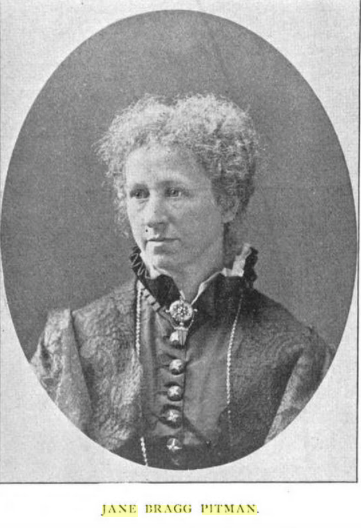
- Born: Jane Bragg; 1825; Birmingham, England
- Died: February 11, 1875 (aged 49–50); Hillside, Ohio, U.S.
- Occupation: Reporter
- Spouse: Benjamin Pitman (m. 1849)
- Children: 3

Jane Bragg Pitman (born Jane Bragg; September 1, 1825 – February 11, 1877) was an English-born reporter known for her shorthand in the United States. She was also active in the arts and crafts movement in the United States for her wood engravings.

== Early life ==
Pitman was born in Birmingham, England, in 1825. She was the second daughter of a family with four sisters, Mary Ann, Elizabeth, Caroline and Maria and five brothers, Thomas, John, William, Joseph and Robert Bragg. She received an education at a private school in England and soon became a tutor for the institution. In 1844, she took a phonography class led by Benjamin and Isaac Pitman. In 1849, she married Benjamin Pitman. In June 1850, Jane and Benjamin had their first daughter, Agnes Pitman. The couple had their first son, Arnold, in 1851 and their second son, Ellis, in 1853.

While pregnant with her third child, Elis, the Pitman family moved to the United States in January 1853. They moved to the United States due to the influence of Benjamin Pitman's brother, Isaac, who wanted to establish and spread phonographic shorthand before it was popularized. Soon after the move, while transitioning in Philadelphia, Pennsylvania, Jane gave birth to her second son, Ellis. Both Ellis and Arnold died during their brief stay in Pennsylvania. By 1855, the Pitman's settled in Cincinnati, Ohio, where her husband established the Cincinnati Phonographic Institute.

== Career ==
In Cincinnati, Bragg learned the publication of phonographic and phonetic works, engraving and type setting, and typography. She revised the final proofs of D. S. Smalley's American Phonetic Dictionary of the English Language published in 1855. Bragg was also noted to work with her husband in assisting his court case reports and dictating matter from testimonies. She improved court dictation by using a team of writers to dictate one sentence at a time and combine it together later. Bragg was the official reporter for the New Orleans riot of 1866.

=== Wood engravings ===
Like her daughter, Agnes Pitman, and husband, Benn Pitman, Jane Bragg began wood carving. In 1872, Jane and her daughter, Agnes, carved several pieces of furniture, doors, and other architectural woodwork which was submitted to the Third Annual Cincinnati Industrial Exhibition.

In her wood carvings, wildlife is a common motif. Birds were carved into the mantle over the fireplace in her home. Bragg was known to love gardening and had botanical knowledge of the plants and flowers she cared for.

== Later life and death ==
Bragg fell ill 1877, and was an invalid for the last year of her life. She died on February 11, 1878, in their residence in Hillside, Ohio, at 52 years old. In accordance with her wishes, her body was cremated at the recently opened crematorium in Washington, Pennsylvania, the first of its kind. She thus became the first woman to be cremated in the United States.
