= George D. Watt =

American journalist

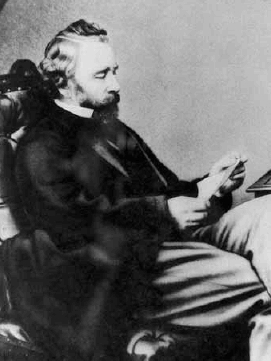
- Born: George Darling Watt; May 12, 1812; Manchester, England
- Died: October 24, 1881 (aged 69); Kaysville, Utah Territory, U.S.
- Resting place: Kaysville City Cemetery; 41.046462°N 111.926819°W
- Notable work: Primary editor of the Journal of Discourses and the primary inventor of the Deseret Alphabet
- Spouses: Molly Gregson; Jane Brown; Alice Whittaker; Elizabeth Golightly; Sarah Ann Harter; Martha Bench

George Darling Watt (12 May 1812 – 24 October 1881) was the first convert to Mormonism baptized in the British Isles. As a member of The Church of Jesus Christ of Latter-day Saints (LDS Church), Watt was a secretary to Brigham Young, the primary editor of the Journal of Discourses, and the primary inventor of the Deseret Alphabet.

Watt was born in Manchester, England. While living in Preston as a young man, Watt was a member of the Reverend James Fielding's congregation. Fielding's brother Joseph had joined the Latter-day Saint church in Upper Canada and had written to James about the new church. In 1837, Latter-day Saint missionaries Heber C. Kimball, Orson Hyde, Willard Richards, and Joseph Fielding traveled to Preston and were given permission by James Fielding to preach in his chapel.

Watt was baptized a Latter-day Saint on July 30, 1837, by Heber C. Kimball in the River Ribble. Watt won the right to be the first official British Latter-day Saint convert by winning a footrace against eight others from Fielding's congregation that desired to join The Church of Jesus Christ of Latter-day Saints. In 1840 and 1841 Watt served as a LDS missionary in Scotland. In 1842, Watt left England to join the gathering of the Latter-day Saints in Nauvoo, Illinois.

In 1846, Brigham Young sent Watt and his wife back to England as church missionaries. Watt used his skill at Pitman shorthand in serving as a clerk to mission president George Q. Cannon. In 1851, the Watts returned to America and joined the new gathering of Latter-day Saints in the Salt Lake Valley in Utah Territory.

In Utah, Watt worked as a reporter for the Deseret News and as a private clerk for Brigham Young. Using his skill as a stenographer, Watt began recording the sermons given by Young and other LDS Church leaders. Beginning in 1853, Watt published these sermons in a periodical known as the Journal of Discourses. Watt remained the primary editor of the Journal until 1868.

In 1852, Watt was appointed by Young to a committee that was charged with creating a new phonetic alphabet that would assist non-English speaking Latter-day Saint immigrants learn English. The result was the Deseret Alphabet. Although the alphabet was largely a failure, Watt remained a strong promoter of the language system.

In 1869, Watt was disfellowshipped from the LDS Church for following the teachings of dissident William S. Godbe. Watt was identified as one of the leaders of the "Godbeites" and was disciplined by the Quorum of the Twelve Apostles. Although Watt was initially repentant and desired to return to full fellowship in the LDS Church, by 1874 he was a devoted Godbeite and was excommunicated from the LDS Church on May 3, 1874.

Later, Watt tried to return to the LDS Church. Four times he attempted to rejoin the church but was denied because his beliefs differed from those of the LDS Church. Upon his last visit to church president John Taylor, Watt said, "President Taylor, I want you to know that if anything happens to me before I am reinstated in the Church, it is your responsibility."

Watt died in Kaysville, Utah Territory, at the age of 65, estranged from the LDS Church and its leaders. Watt's obituary describes him as "honest truthful and sincere although perhaps misguided being a self-made man of strong character and exercising vast influence there is not a little in his career which is remarkable." Following his death, Taylor made a special trip to the home to say that he should be buried in his temple robes.

Like many early Latter-day Saints, Watt practiced plural marriage; he had six wives. One of his wives, Jane Brown, was his half sister—they shared a mother, Mary Ann Wood.
