= Ben Pitman House =

Historic house in Ohio, United States

- U.S. National Register of Historic Places
- Cincinnati Local Historic Landmark
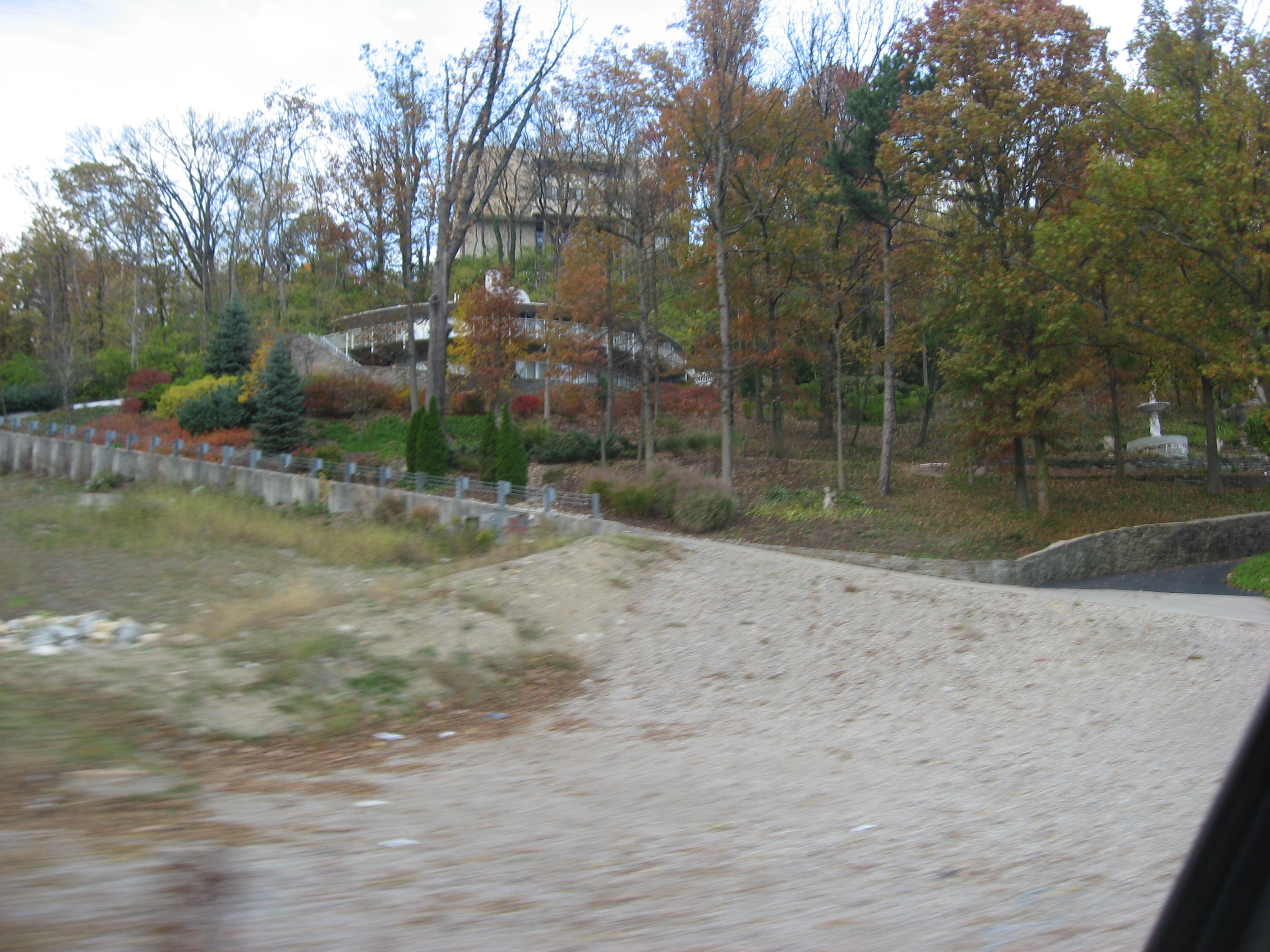
- Driveway to the house

- Location within Ohio
- Location: 1852 Columbia Parkway (U.S. Route 50), Cincinnati, Ohio
- Coordinates: 39°7′13.25″N 84°28′50.34″W
- Architect: Benjamin Pitman
- NRHP reference No.: 69000144
- Added to NRHP: July 7, 1969

Ben Pitman House is a registered historic building in Cincinnati, Ohio, listed in the National Register on July 7, 1969.

Benjamin Pitman lived in this house until his death in 1910.
