= Benjamin Pitman =

American journalist (1822–1910)

Benjamin "Benn" Pitman
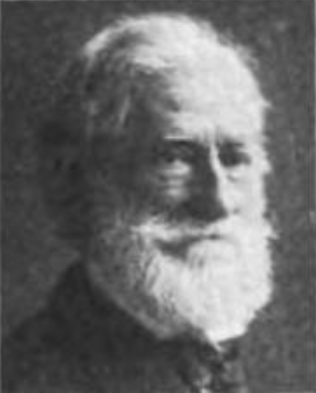
- Born: July 24, 1822; Trowbridge, Wiltshire, England
- Died: December 28, 1910 (aged 88); Cincinnati, Ohio, U.S.
- Occupations: Writer; wood carver; arts and crafts promoter
- Spouses: Jane Bragg (m. 1849; died 1878) Adelaide Nourse (m. 1881)
- Children: 4
- Relatives: Isaac Pitman (brother); Jacob Pitman (brother); Frederick Pitman (brother)
- Writing career
- Subject: Biographies

Benjamin Pitman (July 24, 1822 – December 28, 1910), also known as Benn Pitman, was an English-born author and popularizer in the United States of Pitman shorthand, a form of what was then called phonography (shorthand). He was also active in the Arts and Crafts movement in the United States.

== Early life ==
He was born at Trowbridge, Wiltshire, England. He received a good elementary education there at home, and at a parish school supervised by George Crabbe, a poet. In 1837, he assisted his brother, Isaac Pitman, in perfecting the latter's system of shorthand. From 1843 until 1852, he lectured on the system throughout Great Britain, and had a large role in the compilation of his brother's textbooks.

== Shorthand & reporting ==
At Isaac's request, Benn, Jane and their two children went to the United States in January 1853 so Benn could instruct people in the United States on his brother's system. After brief stays in Philadelphia, Pennsylvania, and Canton, Ohio, they settled at Cincinnati, Ohio, where Benn founded the Phonographic Institute, of which he was long the president. He at first published his brother's shorthand textbooks, giving him credit for the system; but in 1857, when Isaac and his co-laborers made certain changes in the system, he refused to adopt them. Benn felt the original system was better, and the original system became the one which was adopted in the United States. In 1855, Pitman invented the electrochemical process of relief engraving.

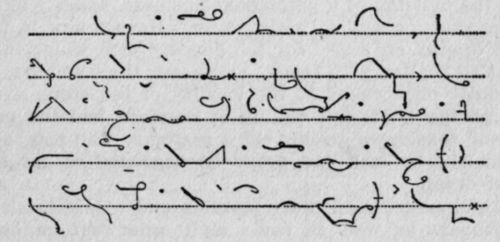
A shorthand example in the system used by Benn Pitman. Transcription: “For the third time the Congress of the United States are assembled to commemorate the life and the death of a president slain by the hand of an assassin. The attention of the future historian will be attracted to the features which reappear with startling sameness in all three of these awful crimes; the uselessness, the utter lack of consequence of the act; the obscurity, the insignificance of the criminal; the blamelessness — so far as in our sphere of existence the best of men may be held blameless — of the victim.”

From his arrival in the United States until 1873 Pitman was chiefly engaged in reporting. During the first years of the Civil War, he served in the Union Army. From 1863 to 1867, he acted as the official stenographer during the trials of the assassin of President Abraham Lincoln, the “Sons of Liberty,” the “Ku-Klux Klan,” and other similar government prosecutions. He also edited and compiled the printed reports of these trials.

== Wood engraving ==
In 1873 he abandoned reporting and began teaching woodcarving courses at the McMicken School of Drawing and Design School of Design, later the Art Academy of Cincinnati, of the University of Cincinnati. His goal was to secure the development of American decorative art and to open up a new profession for women. The display of wood carving and painting on china sent to the Philadelphia Centennial Exhibition was the first attempt to give the public an idea of what had been accomplished. Over 100 pieces were exhibited, including elaborately decorated cabinets, baseboards, bedsteads, doors, casings, mantels, picture frames, and bookcases all the work of girls and women. He lectured at the Cincinnati Art School from 1873 until 1892 on art and wood engraving.

He introduced what later became known as the "Pitman School of Wood Carving", which provided for the treatment of naturalistic designs, and could produce very beautiful effects in wood sculpture. His influence as an artist came to be considerable, particularly throughout the midwest of the United States.

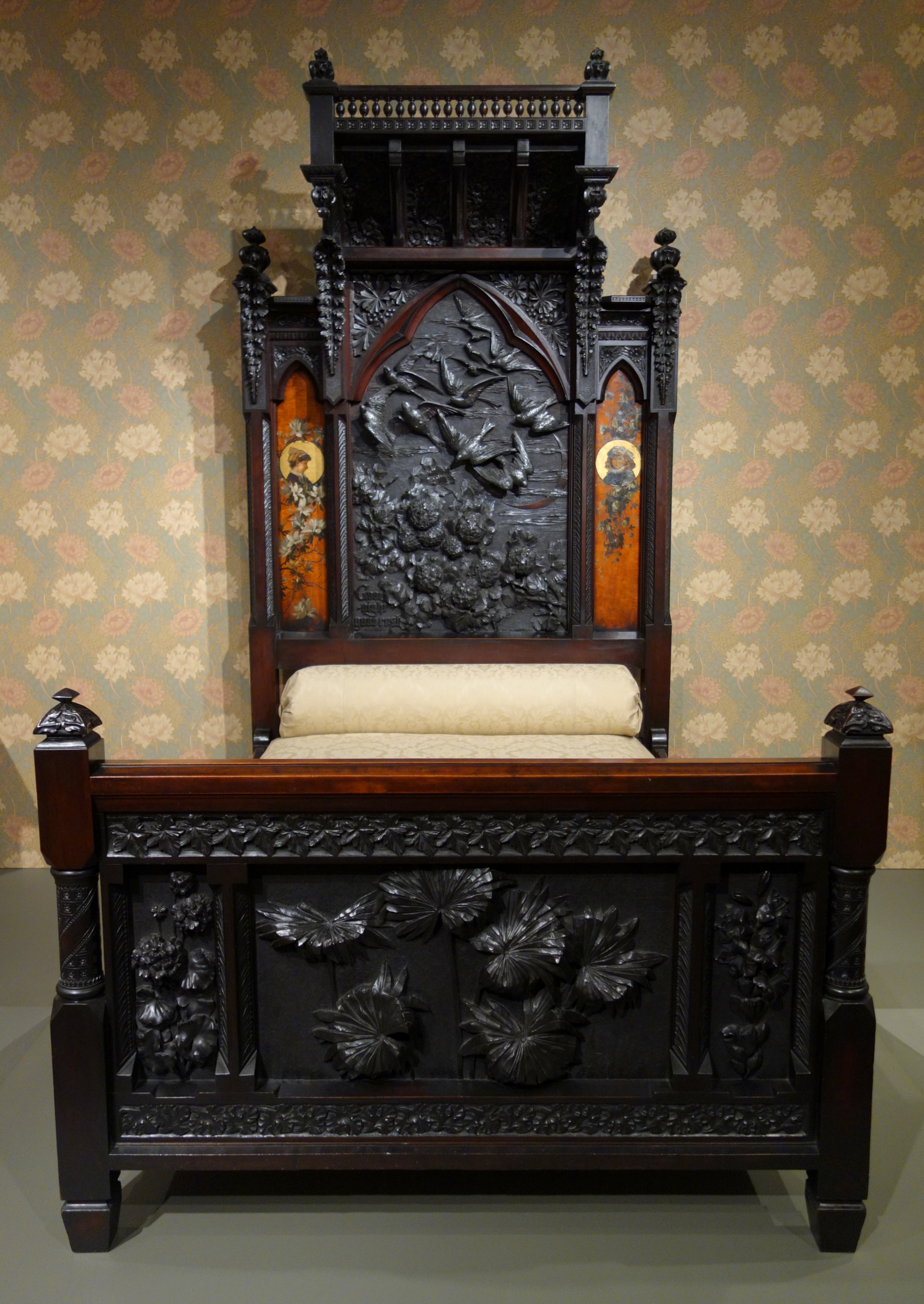
Bedstead by Benn Pitman designer, Adelaide Nourse Pitman carver, Elizabeth Nourse painter, 1882–1883, American black walnut and painted panels

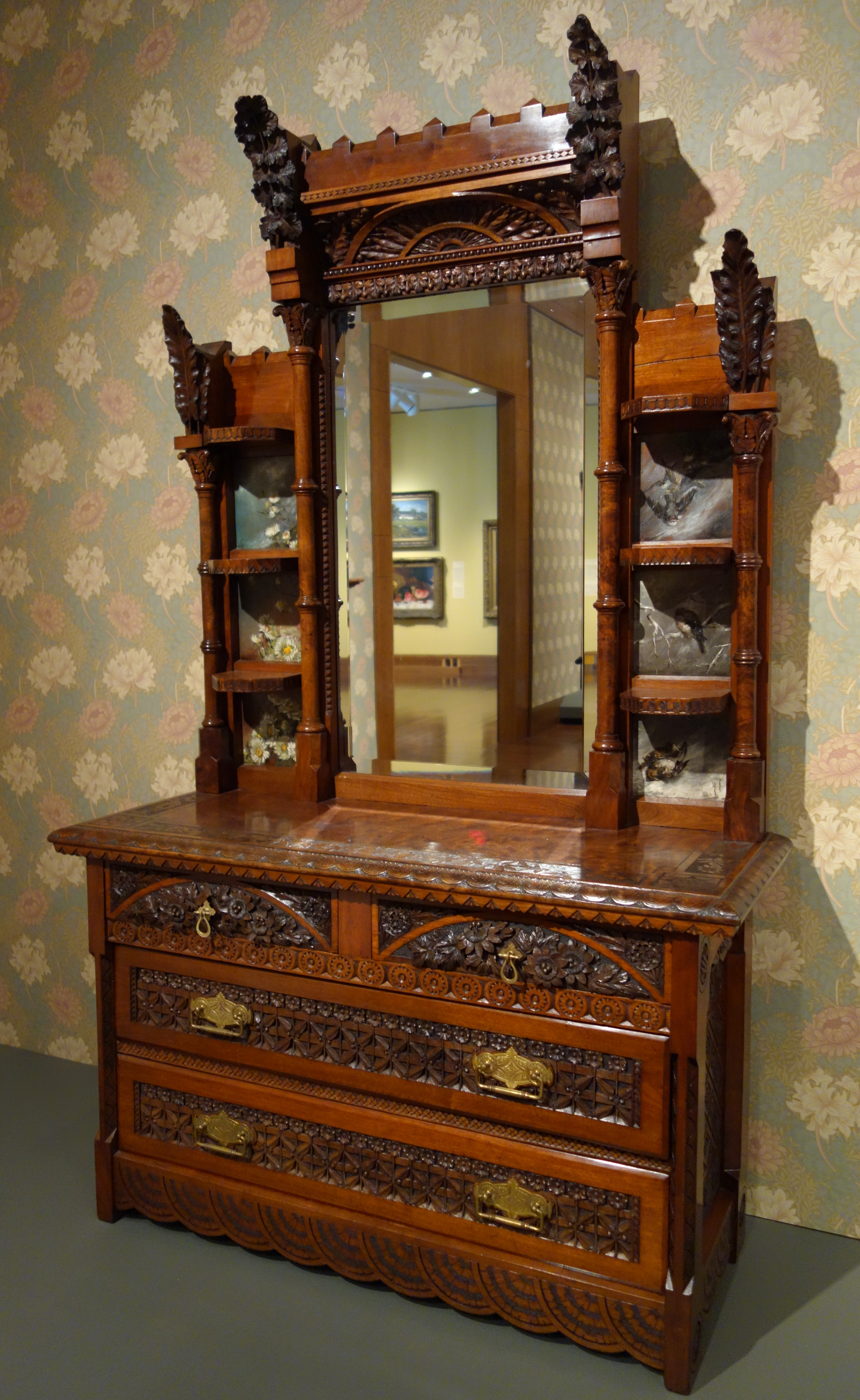
Dresser by Benn Pitman designer, Adelaide Nourse Pitman carver, Elizabeth Nourse attrib painter, c. 1882–1883, American black walnut, white oak, painted panels, glass, gilded brass

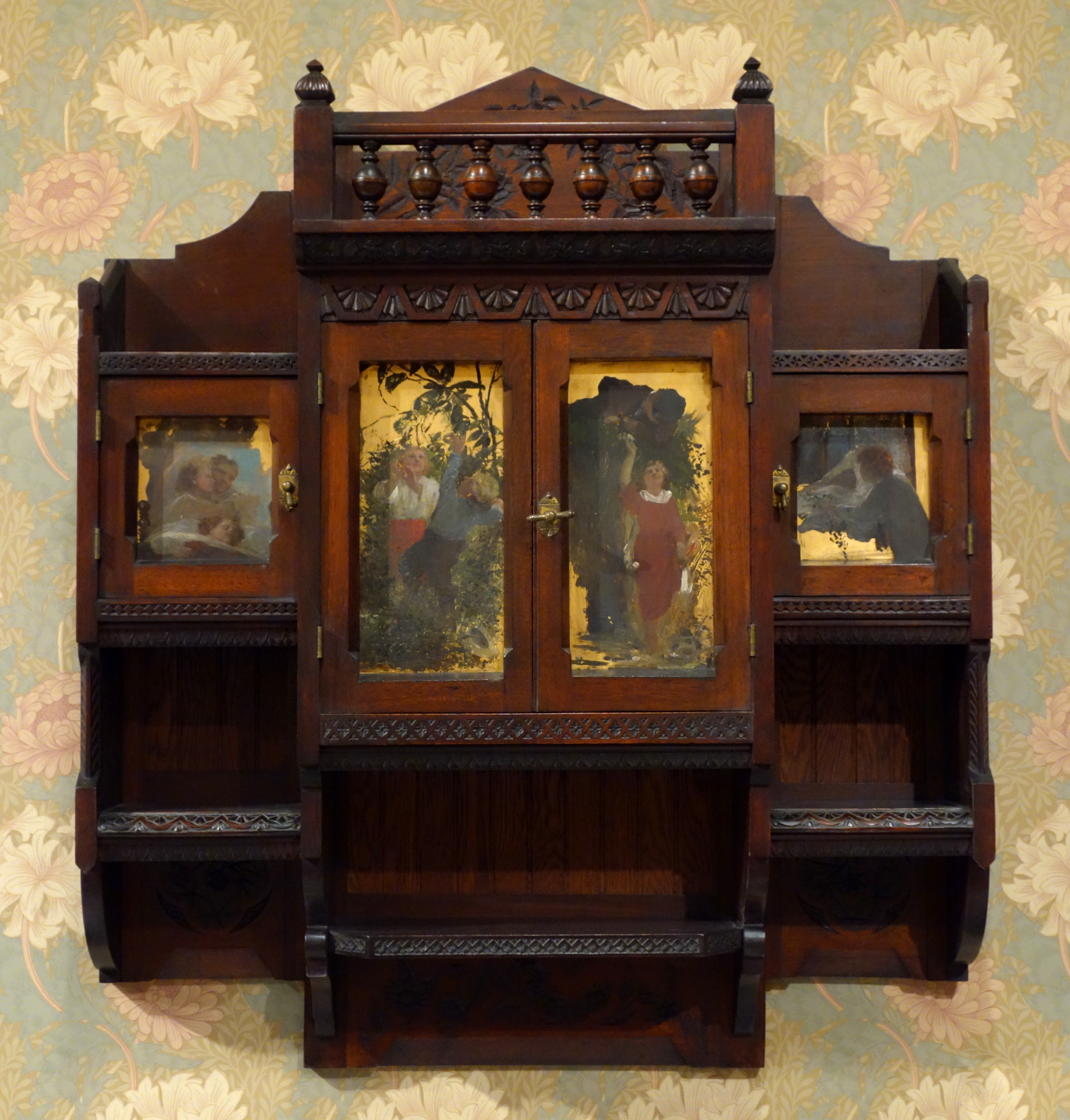
Hanging Cabinet by Benn Pitman designer, Emma Marqua carver, and Charles T. Webber painter, American black walnut, white oak, painted panels, brass

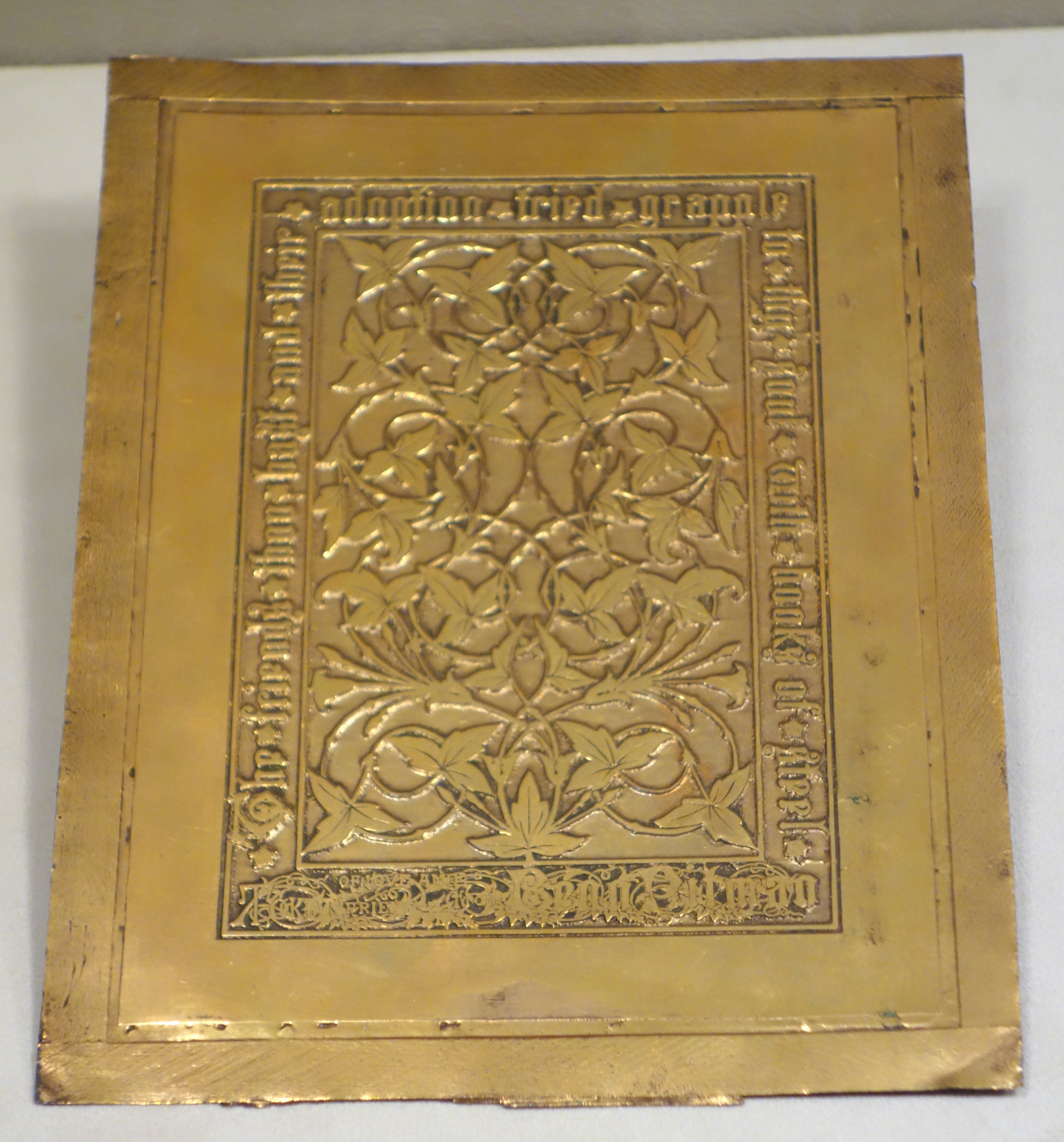
Plaque by Benn Pitman, c. 1880s, brass

== Personal life and death ==
Around 1849, he married his first wife Jane Bragg of Manchester, but she died in 1878. They had three children. He married Adelaide Nourse in 1881, and they had one child. Benn Pitman died in 1910. His Cincinnati home, the Ben Pitman House, overlooks the Ohio River and is listed on the National Register of Historic Places.

== Writings ==
- The Reporter's Companion (Cincinnati, 1854)
- The Manual of Phonography, of which 250,000 copies have been issued (1855)
- History of Shorthand (1858)
- Trials for Treason at Indianapolis
- The Assassination of President Lincoln, and the Trial of the Conspirators (1865)
- A Plea for American Decorative Art (1895)
- The Phonographic Dictionary, with Jerome B. Howard (1883 and 1899)

He also wrote many elementary books of instruction on phonography. In 1902 he wrote a biography of his brother, Sir Isaac Pitman: His Life and Labors.
