= List of Star Trek tie-in fiction =

Fictional works based on Star Trek

List of original audiobooks, gamebooks, parodies, photo comics, and picture books based on Star Trek and its spin-offs, as well as fictional references, manuals, and biographies written from an in-universe perspective, and other tie-in fiction works.

Tie-in fiction works have been published by Simon & Schuster, Titan Books, and by souvenir book publisher Insight Editions. Other publishers include Random House, St. Martin's Press, Running Press, and Cedar Mill.

Key:
All books published as paperback editions, except where indicated.
| † | Hardcover first edition |
| ^ | Children's or young adult book |
| Teal | Book line or flagship series name |
| ed. | Omnibus or collection editor(s) |
| et al. | Multiple authors, see note |

== Random House (1975–2022) ==
Penguin Random House and its imprints, such as Ballantine, Bantam, have published tie-in works based on Star Trek since 1975. Random House also distributes titles published by DK and Titan to the U.S., as well as select titles from smaller publishers. Hero Collector, an imprint of Eagle Moss, is also distributed to booksellers by Random House.

| Title † | Author | Date | ISBN |
|---|---|---|---|
| What Would Captain Kirk Do? | Brandon T. Snider | May 17, 2016 | 978-0-399-53954-1 |
| What Would Captain Picard Do? | Brandon T. Snider | May 16, 2017 | 978-0-515-15714-7 |

=== Star Fleet manuals (1975–1977) ===
The Star Fleet manuals were fan-produced, self-published works, later reprinted by Ballantine Books. The self-published editions did not include any uses of the Star Trek name. Joseph's Technical Manual served as the basis for the Star Fleet Universe series of games published by Task Force.

| Title | Author(s) | Date | ISBN |
|---|---|---|---|
| Star Fleet Technical Manual | Franz Joseph | June 1975 | 0-345-24730-2 |
| Star Fleet Medical Reference Manual | Doug Drexler and Anthony Fredrickson | October 1977 | 0-345-27473-3 |

=== Star Trek Pop Up (1977) ===
Four-page children's pop-up books published by Random House Merchandising. The books were printed and assembled in Brazil.

| Title †^ | Author | Date | ISBN |
|---|---|---|---|
| Giant in the Universe | Kay Wood | January 1977 | 0-394-83556-5 |
| Trillions of Trilligs | Kay Wood | January 1977 | 0-394-83558-1 |

=== Star Trek Fotonovel (1977–78) ===
Star Trek Fotonovel series is a twelve-volume photo comic adaptation of popular Star Trek episodes. The comics were produced by Mandala Productions for Bantam Books. Each volume includes full-color, photographic stills taken from the film master of each episode with comics-style speech and scene bubbles. Mandala Productions promoted each volume as an "accurate and faithful recreation" of each episode. The series was cancelled due to poor sales.

| No. | Title | Author(s) | Date | ISBN |
|---|---|---|---|---|
| 1 | City on the Edge of Forever | Harlan Ellison | November 1977 | 0-553-11345-3 |
| 2 | Where No Man Has Gone Before | Samuel A. Peeples | November 1977 | 0-553-11346-1 |
| 3 | The Trouble With Tribbles | David Gerrold | December 1977 | 0-553-11347-X |
| 4 | A Taste of Armageddon | Robert Hamner and Gene L. Coon | January 1978 | 0-553-11348-8 |
| 5 | Metamorphosis | Gene L. Coon | February 1978 | 0-553-11349-6 |
| 6 | All Our Yesterdays | Jean Lisette Aroeste | March 1978 | 0-553-11350-X |
| 7 | The Galileo 7 | Oliver Crawford and S. Bar-David | May 1978 | 0-553-12041-7 |
| 8 | A Piece of the Action | David P. Harmon and Gene L. Coon | June 1978 | 0-553-12022-0 |
| 9 | The Devil in the Dark | Gene L. Coon | July 1978 | 0-553-12021-2 |
| 10 | Day of the Dove | Jerome Bixby | August 1978 | 0-553-12017-4 |
| 11 | The Deadly Years | David P. Harmon | September 1978 | 0-553-12028-X |
| 12 | Amok Time | Theodore Sturgeon | October 1978 | 0-553-12012-3 |

=== Official Cooking Manual (1978) ===
Official Star Trek Cooking Manual (1978) compiled recipes for foods and drinks referenced in episodes of the Original Series. The framing device is the manual, a document from Christine Chapel's personal database, is transmitted into the past, which was then edited for print by Mary Ann Piccard. Published by Bantam Books.

| Title | Editor | Date | ISBN |
|---|---|---|---|
| Official Star Trek Cooking Manual | Mary Ann Piccard | January 1978 | 0-553-11819-6 |

=== Star Trek Maps (1980) ===
Star Trek Maps (1980) is a box set of color maps and an instructional booklet demonstrating the stellar cartography and navigation system as seen on episodes of Star Trek live-action and animated series, and Star Trek: The Motion Picture. Designed by Jeffrey Maynard, with contributions from Rick Sternbach, and Geoffrey Mandel. Larry Nemecek made uncredited contributions. Nemecek expanded on the design language developed for Star Trek Maps in Star Charts (2003) in collaboration with Mandel. References to Star Trek Maps are included in Stellar Cartography (2013), also by Nemecek.

| Title | Author(s) | Date | ISBN |
|---|---|---|---|
| Star Trek Maps (box set) | Jeffrey Maynard, et al. (Note: Star Trek Maps (1980) by Jeffrey Maynard, designer, Michael McMaster, Geoffrey Mandel, Lee Cole, Michael Nicastre, Rick Sternbach, and John Upton, artists.) | August 1980 | 0-553-01202-9 |

=== DK (2013–present) ===
References published by DK.

| Title † | Author | Date | ISBN |
|---|---|---|---|
| Star Trek: The Visual Dictionary ^ | Paul Ruditis | March 18, 2013 | 978-1-4654-0337-7 |
| The Star Trek Book | Paul Ruditis | June 7, 2016 | 978-1-4654-5098-2 |
| The Star Trek Book, new ed. | Paul Ruditis | August 3, 2021 | 978-0-7440-3696-1 |

=== Little Golden Books (2019–2020) ===
Children's picture books published as part of the long-running Little Golden Books series. Illustrated by Ethen Beavers.

| Title †^ | Author(s) | Date | ISBN |
|---|---|---|---|
| I am Captain Kirk | Frank Berrios | January 8, 2019 | 978-1-9848-2973-3 |
| I am Mr. Spock | Elizabeth Schaefer | January 8, 2019 | 978-1-9848-2975-7 |
| Too Many Tribbles! | Frank Berrios | July 2, 2019 | 978-1-9848-4800-0 |
| The Star Trek ABC Book | — | July 7, 2020 | 978-0-593-12187-0 |

=== BenBella (2021–2022) ===
Books by boutique publisher BenBella Books.

| Title †^ | Author(s) | Date | ISBN |
|---|---|---|---|
| Star Trek Is... (essay collection) | Robb Pearlmann | September 7, 2021 | 978-1-63774-019-4 |
| The Star Trek Book of Friendship ^ | Robb Pearlmann | May 10, 2022 | 978-1-63774-051-4 |

== Simon & Schuster (1979–2022) ==
Pocket Books, an imprint of Simon & Schuster's, has published licensed tie-ins and other works for Star Trek since 1979. Other Simon & Schuster imprints, including Wanderer, Archway, Simon & Schuster For Boys, and Simon & Schuster Audioworks, also published tie-in fiction works.

| Title | Author(s) | Date | ISBN |
|---|---|---|---|
| Spaceflight Chronology | Stan Goldstein and Fred Goldstein | December 1979 | 0-671-79089-7 |
| Mr. Scott's Guide to the Enterprise | Shane Johnson | November 1987 | 0-671-63576-X |
| The Worlds of the Federation | Shane Johnson | August 1989 | 0-671-66989-3 |
| Star Trek: The Next Generation Technical Manual | Rick Sternbach and Michael Okuda | November 1991 | 0-671-70427-3 |
| The Ferengi Rules of Acquisition (Deep Space Nine) | Ira Steven Behr (Note: As by Quark, a resident of the Deep Space Nine station, as told to Ira Steven Behr.) | July 1995 | 0-671-52936-6 |
| Q's Guide to the Continuum | Michael Jan Friedman and Robert Greenberger | September 1998 | 0-671-01948-1 |
| Star Trek: Deep Space Nine Technical Manual | Herman Zimmerman, Doug Drexler and Rick Sternbach | October 1998 | 0-671-01563-X |
| New Worlds, New Civilizations † | Michael Jan Friedman | November 1999 | 0-671-88103-5 |
| Star Trek Celebrations | Maureen McTigue | September 2001 | 0-7434-1773-9 |
| Starship Spotter | Adam Lebowitz and Robert Bonchune | November 2001 | 0-7434-3725-X |
| The Hologram's Handbook (Voyager) | Robert Picardo | April 9, 2002 | 0-7434-3791-8 |
| The Starfleet Survival Guide | David Mack | September 17, 2002 | 0-7434-1842-5 |
| Star Charts (atlas) | Geoffrey Mandel | October 8, 2002 | 0-7434-3770-5 |
| Ships of the Line (Note: Similarly named works: Ship of the Line (1997), a novel by Diane Carey; Ships of the Line (2006), a fictional reference by Michael Okuda.) † | Michael Okuda | November 7, 2006 | 1-4165-3243-9 |
| A Very Klingon Khristmas †^ | Paul Ruditis | October 29, 2013 | 978-1-4767-4680-7 |
| The Klingon Art of War † | Keith DeCandido | May 6, 2014 | 978-1-4767-5739-1 |
| Warped (Note: Similarly named works: Warped (1995), a Deep Space Nine novel by K. W. Jeter; Warped (2015), a The Next Generation parody episode guide by Mike McMahan.) | Mike McMahan | October 13, 2015 | 978-1-4767-7905-8 |
| The Wisdom of Captain Picard † | Chip Carter, ed. | November 10, 2020 | 978-1-5072-1473-2 |

=== Film tie-ins for children (1980–1996) ===
Children's tie-ins based on the film series. Published by various imprints of Simon & Schuster, including Wanderer, Just for Boys, and Archway.

| Title ^ | Author(s) | Date | ISBN |
|---|---|---|---|
| Star Trek: The Motion Picture – The Pop-Up Book † | Tor Lukvig and Chuck Murphy | February 1980 | 0-671-95536-5 |
| First Contact: The Borg (Note: Similarly named works: Star Trek: Borg (1996), an audio dramatization by Hilary Bader; First Contact: The Borg (1994), a children's picture book by Teresa Reed; and Star Trek: Borg, an unpublished novelization of the audio dramatization of the same name.) (picture book) | Teresa Reed | December 1996 | 0-689-80897-6 |
| First Contact: Breaking the Barrier (picture book) | Teresa Reed | December 1996 | 0-689-80898-4 |
| First Contact: The Movie Storybook (picture book) | Jane B. Mason | December 1996 | 0-689-80899-2 |

=== Film photo comics (1980–1982) ===
Photo comic adaptations edited by Richard J. Anibole, and published by Pocket Books. The Motion Picture photo comic contains full-color photographic reproductions of scenes, with comics-style speech and action bubbles. The Wrath of Khan adaptation contains black and white stills, with plain text descriptions.

| Title | Author(s) | Date | ISBN |
|---|---|---|---|
| Star Trek: The Motion Picture: The Photostory | Richard J. Anibole | April 1980 | 0-671-83089-9 |
| The Wrath of Khan Photostory | Richard J. Anibole | August 1982 | 0-671-45912-0 |

=== Interactive gamebooks (1982–1986) ===
Interactive gamebooks similar to Choose Your Own Adventure published by various Simon & Schuster imprints.

| Title ^ | Author(s) | Date | ISBN |
|---|---|---|---|
| Star Trek II: The Wrath of Khan – Distress Call! (Plot-Your-Own Adventure) | William Rotsler | December 1982 | 0-671-46389-6 |
| Star Trek III: The Search for Spock – The Vulcan Treasure (Plot-It-Yourself Adventure) | William Rotsler and Wendy Barish | May 1984 | 0-671-50138-0 |

==== Which Way Books (1984–1986) ====
The Which Way Books gamebook series includes two volumes based on Star Trek. Published by Archway.

| No. | Title ^ | Author(s) | Date | ISBN |
|---|---|---|---|---|
| 15 | Voyage to Adventure | Michael J. Dodge (Note: Michael J. Dodge is pseudonymous John M. Ford.) | May 1984 | 0-671-62492-X |
| 24 | Phaser Fight | Barbara Siegel and Scott Siegel | December 1986 | 0-671-63248-5 |

=== Klingon language instruction ===
Klingon language instruction written by Marc Okrand.

| Title | Date | ISBN | ISBN (cassette) | ISBN (digital) |
|---|---|---|---|---|
| The Klingon Dictionary | December 1985 | 0-671-54349-0 | | |
| Conversational Klingon | October 1992 | | 0-671-79739-5 | 0-7435-4269-X |
| Power Klingon | October 1993 | | 0-671-87975-8 | |
| The Klingon Way | May 1996 | 0-671-53755-5 | | 0-7435-4274-6 |
| Klingon for the Galactic Traveler | September 1997 | 0-671-00995-8 | | |

=== Star Trek Chronology (1993–1996) ===
Star Trek Chronology (1993) is a chronological reference of events depicted in Star Trek and The Next Generation. The chronology was commissioned by Gene Roddenberry in 1987 with the expectation the result would be "7–10 pages of dates". A revised edition was published in 1996.

| Title | Author(s) | Date | ISBN |
|---|---|---|---|
| Star Trek Chronology | Michael Okuda and Denise Okuda | April 1993 | 0-671-79611-9 |
| Star Trek Chronology, rev. ed. | Michael Okuda and Denise Okuda | November 1996 | 0-671-53610-9 |

=== Original audio dramas ===
Audio presentations including an original score and a cast of three or more voices.

| Title | Author(s) | Date | ISBN (cassette) | ISBN (CD) | ISBN (digital) |
|---|---|---|---|---|---|
| Transformations (Captain Sulu Adventure) | David Stern | February 1994 | 0-671-86438-6 | 0-671-88624-X | 0-7435-4250-9 |
| Cacophony (Captain Sulu Adventure) | J.J. Molloy | September 1994 | 0-671-85331-7 | 0-671-52286-8 | 0-7435-4253-3 |
| Envoy (Captain Sulu Adventure) | L.A. Graf | April 1995 | 0-671-52141-1 | 0-671-52286-8 | 0-7435-4255-X |
| Star Trek: Klingon (Note: Similarly named works: Star Trek: Klingon (1996), an audio dramatization by Hilary Bader; Star Trek: Klingon (1996), novelization by Dean Wesley Smith and Kristine Kathryn Rusch of the audio dramatization of the same name by Hilary Bader.) | Hilary Bader | August 1996 | 0-671-57369-1 | 0-671-57503-1 | 0-7435-4643-1 |
| Star Trek: Borg | Hilary Bader | December 1996 | 0-671-57491-4 | 0-671-57502-3 | 0-7435-4256-8 |
| Spock vs. Q (Alien Voices, No. 1) | Cecelia Fannon | November 1999 | 0-671-04581-4 | 0-671-04583-0 | 0-7435-6683-1 |
| Spock vs. Q: The Sequel (Alien Voices, No. 2) | Cecelia Fannon | December 2000 | 0-7435-0702-9 | 0-7435-0703-7 | 0-7435-6982-2 |
| No Man's Land (Picard) | Kirsten Beyer and Mike Johnson | February 22, 2022 | | | 978-1-7971-2453-7 |

=== Star Trek Cookbook (1999–2022) ===
The Star Trek Cookbook (1999) was presented as a cookbook co-written by Voyager's chef, Neelix. A new edition was published in 2022.

| Title | Author(s) | Date | ISBN |
|---|---|---|---|
| The Star Trek Cookbook | Ethan Phillips and William J. Birnes | January 1999 | 0-671-00022-5 |
| The Star Trek Cookbook, new ed. | Chelsea Monroe-Cassel, ed. | September 20, 2022 | 978-1-9821-8628-9 |

== Hero Collector (2018–2021) ==
Licensed works published by Hero Collector. Distributed to booksellers by Penguin Random House.

| Title † | Editor(s) | Date | ISBN |
|---|---|---|---|
| Star Trek Cocktails: A Stellar Compendium | Glenn Dakin | November 3, 2020 | 978-1-85875-968-5 |
| Mr Spock's Little Book of Mindfulness | Glenn Dakin | November 3, 2020 | 978-1-85875-953-1 |
| Star Trek: Voyager – A Celebration (reference) | Ben Robinson and Mark Wright | November 17, 2020 | 978-1-85875-614-1 |
| Star Trek: The Original Series – A Celebration (reference) | Ben Robinson and Ian Spelling | September 21, 2021 | 978-1-85875-990-6 |

=== Shipyards (2018–2022) ===
Star Trek Shipyards, also known as The Encyclopedia of Star Trek Ships, is an illustrated reference series which collects and expands on material originally created for the Star Trek: The Official Starships Collection.

| Title † | Contributor(s) | Date | ISBN |
|---|---|---|---|
| Starfleet Ships, 2151–2293 | Ben Robinson and Marcus Riley | September 25, 2018 | 978-1-85875-522-9 |
| Starfleet Ships, 2294 to the Future | Ben Robinson and Marcus Riley | November 13, 2018 | 978-1-85875-530-4 |
| The Klingon Fleet | Ben Robinson, Marcus Riley, and Matt McAllister | June 4, 2019 | 978-1-85875-539-7 |
| Federation Members | Ben Robinson and Marcus Riley | November 19, 2019 | 978-1-85875-576-2 |
| The Borg and Delta Quadrant: Akritirian to Krenim | Ian Chaddock, Marcus Riley, and Mark Wright | March 30, 2021 | 978-1-85875-956-2 |
| The Delta Quadrant: Ledosian to Zahl | Ian Chaddock, Marcus Riley, and Mark Wright | June 8, 2021 | 978-1-85875-973-9 |
| Alpha Quadrant and Major Species: Acamarian to Ktarian | Ben Robinson | March 15, 2022 | 978-1-85875-992-0 |
| Alpha Quadrant and Major Species: Lysian to Romulan | Ben Robinson | May 17, 2022 | 978-1-80126-051-0 |

=== Designing Starships (2018–19) ===
Star Trek Designing Starships is an illustrated reference series offering a mixture of non-fiction and in-universe material concerning the design and function of the featured starships.

| Vol. | Title | Editors(s) | Date | ISBN |
|---|---|---|---|---|
| 1 | The Enterprises and Beyond | Ben Robinson and Marcus Riley | October 16, 2018 | 978-1-85875-527-4 |
| 2 | The U.S.S. Voyager and Beyond | Ben Robinson and Marcus Riley | January 8, 2019 | 978-1-85875-532-8 |
| 3 | The Kelvin Timeline | Ben Robinson | April 30, 2019 | 978-1-85875-538-0 |
| 4 | Star Trek: Discovery | Ben Robinson, Marcus Riley, and Matt McAllister | September 3, 2019 | 978-1-85875-574-8 |

=== Illustrated handbooks (2019–21) ===
Illustrated references collecting and updating selections from Star Trek Fact Files, as well as new material. Similar to other illustrated reference works, the contents are a mix of in-universe and non-fiction prose. The series is a spin-off of the Star Trek: The Official Starships Collection.

| Title | Editors(s) | Date | ISBN |
|---|---|---|---|
| The U.S.S. Enterprise NCC-1701 and 1701-A Illustrated Handbook | Ben Robinson, Marcus Riley, and Simon Hugo | October 15, 2019 | 978-1-85875-578-6 |
| The U.S.S. Enterprise NCC-1701-D Illustrated Handbook (The Next Generation) | Ben Robinson and Marcus Riley | July 9, 2019 | 978-1-85875-540-3 |
| The U.S.S. Voyager NCC-74656 Illustrated Handbook | Ben Robinson | April 28, 2020 | 978-1-85875-612-7 |
| Deep Space Nine and the U.S.S. Defiant Illustrated Handbook | Ben Robinson and Simon Hugo | February 9, 2021 | 978-1-85875-951-7 |

== Other works ==
Below is an incomplete list of notable tie-in works:

=== Klingon Hamlet (1996–2000) ===
Hamlet, Prince of Denmark: The Restored Klingon Version (1996) is a Klingon language reference translation of William Shakespeare's Hamlet. Also known as The Tragedy of Khamlet, Son of the Emperor of Qo'noS. Published as a limited edition by the Klingon Language Institute in 1996. Published as The Klingon Hamlet by Pocket Books in 2000.

| Title | Author(s) | Publisher | Date | ISBN |
|---|---|---|---|---|
| Hamlet, The Prince of Denmark † | Mark Shoulson, ed., et al. (Note: As by William Shakespeare. Mark Shoulson, d'Armond Speers, and Will Martin, editors. Nick Nicholas and Andrew Strader, translators.) | Klingon Language Institute | March 1996 | 0-9644345-1-2 |
| The Klingon Hamlet (reprint) | Mark Shoulson, ed., et al. | Pocket Books | February 2000 | 0-671-03578-9 |

=== Federation: The First 150 Years (2012–13) ===
Star Trek: Federation: The First 150 Years (2012) is a limited edition fictional reference written by David A. Goodman. Editions from 47North and becker&mayer! included an audio introduction by George Takei, and a custom display case. Titan Books published a reprint in 2013 which included formatting and prose changes.

| Title † | Author | Publisher | Date | ISBN |
|---|---|---|---|---|
| Federation: The First 150 Years (limited ed.) | David A. Goodman | becker&mayer! / 47North | December 4, 2012 | 978-1-61218-417-3 |
| Federation: The First 150 Years (reprint) | David A. Goodman | Titan Books | October 8, 2013 | 978-1-78116-915-5 |

=== New Visions (2013–2019) ===
Star Trek: New Visions is a photo comic series which utilized imagery from episodes of Star Trek to create new stories. The images were stitched together using modern photo editing and special effects software. Each completed frame is original to the comics. Characters, settings, and action, were designed to appear seamless, regardless of the image's source. All issues were produced by John Byrne, and published by IDW Publishing. Collections were published in trade paperback format from 2014 to 2019. "The Mirror, Cracked" and "Time's Echo" were assigned an ISBN.

| No. | Issue | Issue date | Collection | Date | ISBN |
|---|---|---|---|---|---|
| 1 | "The Mirror, Cracked" (Note: Star Trek: New Visions, Issue 1 (2014) was assigned ISBN 978-1-63140-002-5.) | May 14, 2014 | New Visions, Vol. 1 | October 21, 2014 | 978-1-63140-039-1 |
| 2 | "Time's Echo" (Note: Star Trek: New Visions, Issue 2 (2014) was assigned ISBN 978-1-63140-119-0.) | August 6, 2014 | New Visions, Vol. 1 | October 21, 2014 | 978-1-63140-039-1 |
| 3 | "Cry Vengeance" | October 22, 2014 | New Visions, Vol. 2 | June 30, 2015 | 978-1-63140-367-5 |
| 4 | "Made Out of Mudd" (Note: Full title: "Made Out of Mudd" and "The Great Tribble Hunt") | December 17, 2014 | New Visions, Vol. 2 | June 30, 2015 | 978-1-63140-367-5 |
| 5 | "A Scent of Ghosts" (Note: Full title: "A Scent of Ghosts" and "Memorium") | March 4, 2015 | New Visions, Vol. 2 | June 30, 2015 | 978-1-63140-367-5 |
| 6 | "Resistance" | May 13, 2015 | New Visions, Vol. 3 | March 8, 2016 | 978-1-63140-536-5 |
| 7 | "1971/4860.2" | July 8, 2015 | New Visions, Vol. 3 | March 8, 2016 | 978-1-63140-536-5 |
| 8 | "The Survival Equation" | September 9, 2015 | New Visions, Vol. 3 | March 8, 2016 | 978-1-63140-536-5 |
| 9 | "The Hollow Man" | November 4, 2015 | New Visions, Vol. 4 | December 27, 2016 | 978-1-63140-805-2 |
| 10 | "Mister Chekov" | January 6, 2016 | New Visions, Vol. 4 | December 27, 2016 | 978-1-63140-805-2 |
| 11 | "Of Woman Born" (Note: Full title: "Of Woman Born" and "I Sing of Arms and Heroes") | May 6, 2016 | New Visions, Vol. 4 | December 27, 2016 | 978-1-63140-805-2 |
| 12 | "Swarm" | September 21, 2016 | New Visions, Vol. 5 | September 5, 2017 | 978-1-68405-088-8 |
| 13 | "The Hidden Face" | December 7, 2016 | New Visions, Vol. 5 | September 5, 2017 | 978-1-68405-088-8 |
| 14 | "Sam" | February 1, 2017 | New Visions, Vol. 5 | September 5, 2017 | 978-1-68405-088-8 |
| 15 | "The Traveler" (Note: Full title: "The Traveler" and "Should Old Acquaintance Be Forgot...") | April 19, 2017 | New Visions, Vol. 6 | January 30, 2018 | 978-1-68405-176-2 |
| 16 | "Time Out of Joint" (Note: Full title: "Time Out of Joint", "Home", and "Those Who Play With Cats...") | June 7, 2017 | New Visions, Vol. 6 | January 30, 2018 | 978-1-68405-176-2 |
| 17 | "All the Ages Frozen" | August 2, 2017 | New Visions, Vol. 6 | January 30, 2018 | 978-1-68405-176-2 |
| 18 | "What Pain It Is to Drown" (Note: Full title: "What Pain It Is to Drown" and "R.H.I.P.") | October 11, 2017 | New Visions, Vol. 7 | August 21, 2018 | 978-1-68405-280-6 |
| 19 | "The Hunger" | December 20, 2017 | New Visions, Vol. 7 | August 21, 2018 | 978-1-68405-280-6 |
| 20 | "Isolation" (Note: Full title: "Isolation" and "Like a Shadow... Like a Dream") | February 7, 2018 | New Visions, Vol. 7 | August 21, 2018 | 978-1-68405-280-6 |
| 21 | "The Enemy of My Enemy" (Note: Full title: "The Enemy of My Enemy" and "The Rhyme of the Ancient Mariner") | April 11, 2018 | New Visions, Vol. 8 | February 6, 2019 | 978-1-68405-377-3 |
| 22 | "An Unexpected Yesterday" | July 4, 2018 | New Visions, Vol. 8 | February 6, 2019 | 978-1-68405-377-3 |

==== Special and unnumbered issues (2013–2016) ====
Star Trek Annual 2013 is a one-shot photo comic published as an experiment conceived as "lost episode" of Star Trek. The annual was reprinted as Strange New Worlds, and later collected in New Visions, Vol. 1.

| Issue | Issue date | Collection | Date | ISBN |
|---|---|---|---|---|
| Star Trek Annual 2013 (Note: Star Trek Annual 2013 was reprinted as Star Trek: Strange New Worlds.) | December 11, 2013 | New Visions, Vol. 1 | October 21, 2014 | 978-1-63140-039-1 |
| "Eye of the Beholder" | — | New Visions, Vol. 2 | June 30, 2015 | 978-1-63140-367-5 |
| "More of the Serpent Than the Dove" | — | Humble Star Trek Comics Bundle | June 29, 2016 | — |
| "Dream a Little Dream" | — | New Visions, Vol. 8 | February 6, 2019 | 978-1-68405-377-3 |
| "The Cage" | July 13, 2016 | New Visions, Vol. 8 | February 6, 2019 | 978-1-68405-377-3 |

=== Stellar Cartography (2013) ===
Stellar Cartography: The Starfleet Reference Library (2013) is a box set of maps and charts which expand on Star Trek Maps (1980) and Star Charts (2003). Produced and written by Larry Nemecek, with art by Allie Ries, Ian Fullwood, and Geoffrey Mandel. A revised edition, with new material, was published in 2018.

| Title | Author | Publisher | Date | ISBN |
|---|---|---|---|---|
| Stellar Cartography (box set) | Larry Nemecek | becker&mayer! / 47North | December 3, 2013 | 978-1-4778-0597-8 |
| Stellar Cartography, rev. ed. (box set) | Larry Nemecek | Epik Ink | October 9, 2018 | 978-0-7603-6381-2 |

=== Hachette Book Group (2014–2017) ===
Works published or distributed by Hachette Book Group.

| Title † | Author | Date | ISBN |
|---|---|---|---|
| Fun with Kirk and Spock ^ (parody) | Robb Pearlman | July 29, 2014 | 978-1-60433-476-0 |
| Search for Spock (Note: Similarly named works: The Search for Spock (1984), a film novelization by Vonda N. McIntyre; Search for Spock (2017), a puzzle book by Robb Pearlman.) ^ (puzzle book) | Robb Pearlman | November 7, 2017 | 978-1-60433-734-1 |
| Body by Starfleet (manual) | Robb Pearlman | December 3, 2019 | 978-0-7624-9577-1 |

=== Insight Editions (2016–2020) ===
Licensed works commissioned by boutique publisher Insight Editions. Hidden Universe Travel Guides is an ongoing series of illustrated in-universe references for various franchises, edited by Dayton Ward. Ward wrote new material for the Star Trek volumes.

The fighting style created by Dayton Ward for Kirk Fu Manual (2020) is depicted in several episodes of Star Trek: Lower Decks.

| Title † | Author | Date | ISBN |
|---|---|---|---|
| Redshirt’s Little Book of Doom (picture book) | Robb Pearlman | July 19, 2016 | 978-1-60887-736-2 |
| Vulcan (Note: Similarly named works: Vulcan!, a novel by Kathleen Sky; Vulcan (2016), a Hidden Universe Travel Guides fictional reference by Dayton Ward.) (Hidden Universe Travel Guide) | Dayton Ward | July 29, 2016 | 978-1-60887-520-7 |
| The Klingon Empire (Note: Published as Qo’noS and the Klingon Empire in the United Kingdom and Australia.) (Note: Similarly named works: Klingon Empire (2008), concept series by Keith DeCandido; The Klingon Empire (2017), a Hidden Universe Travel Guides fictional reference by Dayton Ward.) (Hidden Universe Travel Guide) | Dayton Ward | July 11, 2017 | 978-1-60887-519-1 |
| Kirk Fu Manual (parody guidebook) | Dayton Ward | March 3, 2020 | 978-1-68383-521-9 |

=== Star Trek Cats (2017–18) ===
Star Trek Cats is a series of picture books which depict the crews of the Enterprise as house cats. Written by Jenny Parks. Published by Chronicle Books.

| Title | Author | Date | ISBN |
|---|---|---|---|
| Star Trek Cats † | Jenny Parks | February 28, 2017 | 978-1-4521-5841-9 |
| Star Trek Cats: The Next Generation † | Jenny Parks | March 27, 2018 | 978-1-4521-6762-6 |

=== Star Trek Adventures (2018–2020) ===
Star Trek Adventures is a tabletop role-playing game based on a variation of the d20 System. Published by Modiphius Entertainment. Variants were available in PDF and ebook formats for several years prior to publication. Below is an incomplete list:

| Title † | Date | ISBN |
|---|---|---|
| Star Trek Adventures: The Roleplaying Game (core rulebook) | January 2018 | 978-1-910132-85-2 |
| These Are The Voyages – Mission Compendium, Vol. 1 | January 2018 | 978-1-910132-86-9 |
| The Command Division (supplemental rulebook) | October 2018 | 978-1-910132-87-6 |
| Beta Quadrant (sourcebook) | October 2018 | 978-1-910132-91-3 |
| The Sciences Division (supplemental rulebook) | April 2019 | 978-1-910132-89-0 |
| The Operations Division (supplemental rulebook) | May 2019 | 978-1-910132-88-3 |
| Alpha Quadrant (sourcebook) | August 2019 | 978-1-910132-90-6 |
| Strange New Worlds – Mission Compendium, Vol. 2 | November 2019 | 978-1-912743-46-9 |
| Gamma Quadrant (sourcebook) | March 2020 | 978-1-910132-92-0 |
| Delta Quadrant (sourcebook) | March 2020 | 978-1-910132-93-7 |
| The Klingon Empire (core rulebook) | October 2020 | 978-1-910132-95-1 |

== Unlicensed works ==
Below is an incomplete list of notable unlicensed works:

=== Best of Trek (1978–1997) ===
The Best of Trek: From the Magazine for Star Trek Fans is a multi-volume collection of essays, articles, and reviews originally published in the fan magazine Trek. A significant number of the collected articles and essays were written with an in-universe perspective. Published by Signet, and later Roc, under the New American Library label. The series was published exclusively for the North American market due to rights issues.

| Vol. | Date | Publisher | ISBN |
|---|---|---|---|
| 1 | April 1978 | Signet | 0-451-08030-0 |
| 2 | March 1980 | Signet | 0-451-09131-0 |
| 3 | January 1981 | Signet | 0-451-09582-0 |
| 4 | December 1981 | Signet | 0-451-11221-0 |
| 5 | August 1982 | Signet | 0-451-11751-4 |
| 6 | September 1983 | Signet | 0-451-12493-6 |
| 7 | June 1984 | Signet | 0-451-12977-6 |
| 8 | March 1985 | Signet | 0-451-12977-6 |
| 9 | September 1985 | Signet | 0-451-13816-3 |
| 10 | June 1986 | Signet | 0-451-14311-6 |
| 11 | November 1986 | Signet | 0-451-14576-3 |
| 12 | August 1987 | Signet | 0-451-14935-1 |
| 13 | May 1988 | Signet | 0-451-15325-1 |
| 14 | November 1988 | Signet | 0-451-15614-5 |
| 15 | Jun 1990 | Signet | 0-451-45015-9 |
| 16 | March 1991 | Signet | 0-451-45047-7 |
| 17 | December 1994 | Roc | 0-451-45438-3 |
| 18 | February 1996 | Roc | 0-451-45463-4 |

==== Best of the Best of Trek (1990–1997) ====
The Best of the Best of Trek collects selections from the Best of... series. Revised editions were published in 1997.

| Title | Date | Publisher | ISBN |
|---|---|---|---|
| The Best of the Best of Trek | July 1990 | Signet | 0-451-45017-5 |
| The Best of the Best of Trek II | July 1992 | Signet | 0-451-45159-7 |
| The Best of the Best of Trek, Part 1 | August 1996 | Roc | 0-451-45558-4 |
| The Best of the Best of Trek, Part 2 | January 1997 | Roc | 0-451-45584-3 |

=== The Doctor and the Enterprise (1981) ===
The Doctor and the Enterprise is an unlicensed novella written by Jean Airey, a columnist for Fantasy Empire and Starlog. The novella is based on characters and settings from Doctor Who, Star Trek, and Marion Zimmer Bradley's Darkover. It was first published in the 1981 issue of fanzine R&R. Fanzines Zeta Minor and Enterprise reprinted the novella in various formats from 1982 to 1984. Paperback editions were published by New Media Books in 1985. In 1989, a redacted version of the novella was published professionally by Pioneer Press. It was marketed as a parody, and all direct references to Kirk, Spock, and other Star Trek characters were removed.

| Title | Author | Publisher | Date | ISBN |
|---|---|---|---|---|
| The Doctor and the Enterprise | Jean Airey | Pioneer Press | November 1989 | 1-55698-218-6 |

=== Star Wreck (1992–1994) ===
Star Wreck is a series of unlicensed parody novels written by Leah Rewolinski, with illustrations by Harry Trumbore. Published by St. Martin's Press.

| No. | Title | Author | Date | ISBN |
|---|---|---|---|---|
| 1 | The Generation Gap (Note: Books In Print includes an incomplete record for The Generation Gap, by Leah Rewolinksi, dated October 1990 (ISBN 0-312-92359-7).) | Leah Rewolinski | January 1992 | 0-312-92802-5 |
| 2 | The Attack of the Jargonites | Leah Rewolinski | January 1992 | 0-312-92737-1 |
| 3 | Time Warped | Leah Rewolinski | October 1992 | 0-312-92891-2 |
| 4 | Live Long and Profit | Leah Rewolinski | April 1993 | 0-312-92985-4 |
| 5 | The Undiscovered Nursing Home | Leah Rewolinski | September 1993 | 0-312-95122-1 |
| 6 | Geek Space Nine | Leah Rewolinski | April 1994 | 0-312-95223-6 |
| 7 | Space, the Fido Frontier | Leah Rewolinski | December 1994 | 0-312-95362-3 |

=== Treks Not Taken (1996–1998) ===
Treks Not Taken (1996) is a short story collection by Steven R. Boyett presented as "What if … literary greats had written episodes" of The Next Generation. Boyett parodied the style of several popular writers. Originally published in 1996 by Sneaker Press as a limited edition. Later reprinted by HarperCollins in 1998.

| Title | Author | Publisher | Date | ISBN |
|---|---|---|---|---|
| Treks Not Taken (limited) | Steven R. Boyett | Sneaker Press | August 1996 | 1-882813-05-7 |
| Treks Not Taken (reprint) | Steven R. Boyett | HarperCollins | August 1998 | 0-06-095276-8 |

== Unpublished works ==
Below is an incomplete list of unpublished tie-in fiction works:

| Tentative Title | Author(s) | Publisher | Scheduled | Ref(s) |
|---|---|---|---|---|
| Mr. Spock's Guide to Vulcan (fictional reference) | Gene Roddenberry, et al. (Note: Mr. Spock's Guide to Vulcan has been attributed to Gene Roddenberry, Leonard Nimoy, Susan Sackett, Jacqueline Lichtenberg, Joan Winston, and to co-writers Sondra Marshak and Myrna Culbreath, by various sources. No publisher solicitations or library notices are known to exist.) | Bantam Books | 1980–81 | |
| U.S.S. Enterprise Officer's Date Book (guidebook) | — | Bantam Books | 1980–81 | |
| Unseen Frontier (fictional reference) | Adam Lebowitz and Robert Bonchune | Pocket Books | 2002–03 | |
