= QepHom =

Gathering relating to Klingon

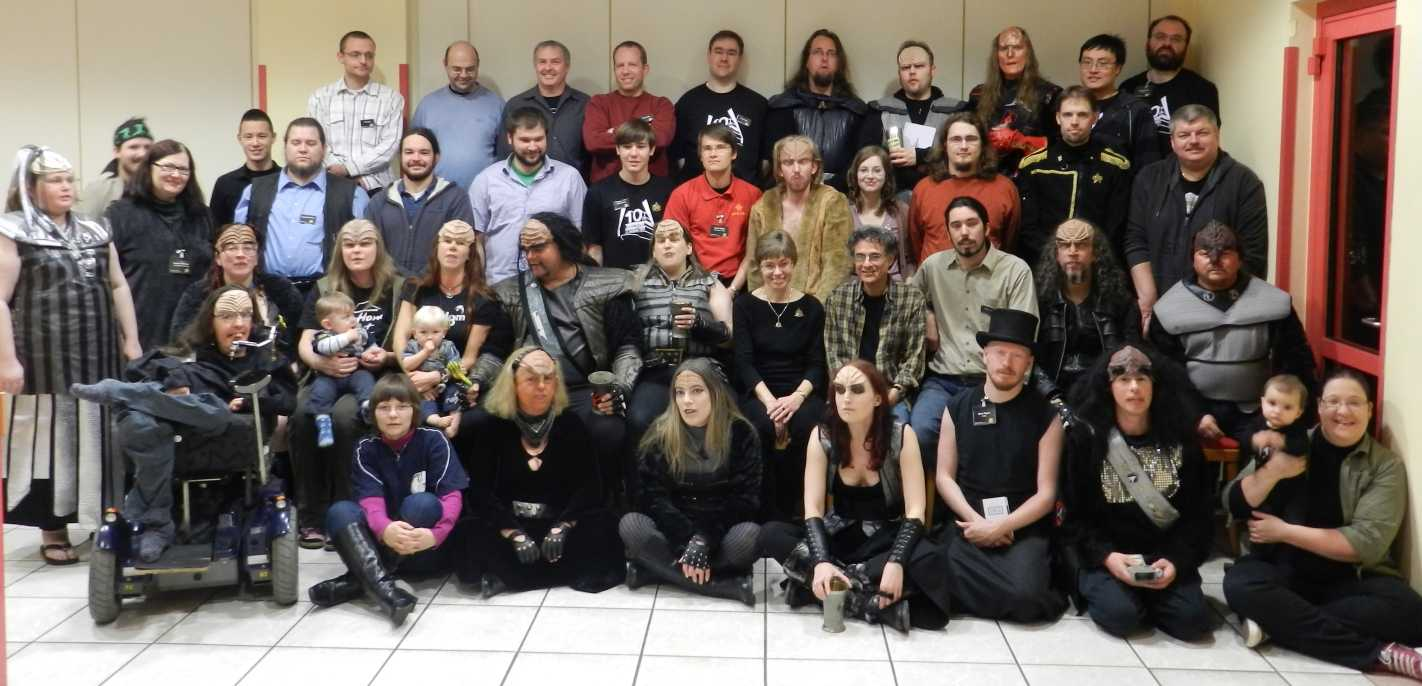
Students at the 10th qepHom in Saarbrücken, with Marc Okrand

The word qepHom ([qʰɛpʰ.ˈxom], Klingon for small gathering) is generally used for any kind of gathering where people may talk about or in Klingon, a fictional language created for Star Trek. In Germany, the word has become commonly used for a specific annual meeting in Saarbrücken, because it is the largest meeting of its kind.

== Background ==
The annual world conference of the Klingon Language Institute is called qepʼaʼ, the Klingon word for "major meeting" (using qep "meeting" plus the augmentative suffix -ʼaʼ). The opposite of that word is qepHom, literally "minor meeting". This was intended as an informal gathering for two or three people who might meet frequently to talk about Klingon. Since the number of Klingon speakers in Europe is too small for such a frequent meeting, the Klingon expert Lieven Litaer set up an all-weekend language camp, which is therefore called qepHom.

== qepHom Saarbrücken ==
=== Participants ===
The Klingon meeting in Germany usually has about 20 to 25 Klingonists, mostly from Europe although there have also been visitors from Canada and the United States. European members come from countries like Sweden, Romania and Poland. As most of the Klingonists are from Germany, the main teaching language is German. A major part of the participants are Star Trek fans, but there are also many students who focus only on the language.

=== Schedule ===
The meeting starts on Thursday and ends on Sunday. Because of the different arrival times of the participants, there is no official schedule on the first day, but Klingonists use that spare time to talk about Klingon. During the meeting there are several lectures and games to learn Klingon for the beginners while the advanced speakers chat in Klingon by themselves in separate groups.

At the last evening, there is a traditional party where some of the participants enjoy dressing up as Klingons.

=== History ===
No.	Date	motto	special
1.	29.11-01.12.2002	-	-
2.	05.-07.12.2003	-	-
3.	26.-28.11.2004	Do is immer ebbes los	TV-documentary about the meeting by a local TV-station
4.	25.-27.11.2005	-	-
5.	17.-19.11.2006	Nummer 5 lebt!	-
6.	16.-18.11.2007	Lernst du noch oder sprichst du schon?	-
7.	14.-16.11.2008	-	-
8.	20.-22.11.2009	qepHom 8 - Die Wörterschlacht	Guest lecture by Hubert Zitt
9.	19.-21.11.2010	qepHom Hut	-
10.	10.-13.11.2011	the anniversary	Participation of Klingon creator Marc Okrand, Release of the Klingon book paqʼbatlh
11.	15.-18.11.2012	Alarm für qepHom 11	Guest lecture by Hubert Zitt
12	07.-10.11.2013	qepHom wa'maH cha' dt.: qepHom 12	Guest lecture by Markus Groß
13	13.-16.11.2014	-	Guest lecture by Hubert Zitt, additional talks by Ernst Buchberger and David Yonge-Mallo
14	29.-31.10.2015	-	-
15	03.-06.11.2016	-	-
16	13.-16.11.2017	-	-
17	16.-18.11.2018	-	-
18	14.-17.11.2019	-	-
(not counted)	12.-15.11.2020 (planned)	qepHom NIX	did not actually take place, though course material was sent out to registered participants
19	16.-18.11.2021	-	online only
20	15.-20.11.2022	-	Longer event to celebrate the anniversary
21	16.-19.11.2023	-	-

== Other locations ==
During the past years, there have been several other qepHommey in Germany that were literally "minor meetings". These were not regular and happened at different places.
