= Klingon culture =

Customs and practices of Klingons

Klingon culture is a set of customs and practices of Klingons depicted in the fictional Star Trek universe. The fictional Klingon society is based on Klingon traditions and conventions, as well as a constructed language named Klingon. Klingons were created by Gene L. Coon.

== Portrayal over time ==
Star Trek: The Original Series (TOS), which ran from 1966 to 1969, modeled the conflict between the Federation and the Klingon Empire on the Cold War (1947–1991), a period of geopolitical tension between the Western countries and the Soviet Union. TOS Klingons were not given many cultural traits, either unique or Soviet-like, beyond a generic need for domination and tyranny. However, they were typically portrayed with bronze skin and facial hair suggestive of North Asian peoples such as the Mongols (in fact, Gene L. Coon's only physical description of them in his Errand of Mercy script is "Oriental, hard-faced").

For Star Trek: The Motion Picture (1979), the Klingons were "reimagined", or retconned. In this movie, Klingons were depicted with ridged foreheads, new uniforms, and a distinctive Klingon language. Gene Roddenberry said that the movie-era Klingons are closer to his original vision but could not be realized in a low-budget television show.

With the advent of Star Trek: The Next Generation (1987–1994), as well as in subsequent series, the Klingons became allies of the Federation, and the portrayal of their culture changed to resemble the adoption of a warrior code similar to that of the samurai (or, rather, Western imaginations of them) and Vikings. Klingon starship crews have also been compared to motorcycle gangs. Certain elements of this retconned Klingon culture, such as a general influence of Japanese culture with honor at the forefront, were actually first explored with the script for the planned two-part "Kitumba" episode for the unproduced Star Trek: Phase II (1978) series. Writer John Meredith Lucas said:

I wanted something that we had never seen before in the series, and that's a penetration deep into enemy space. I started to think of how the Klingons lived. Obviously for the Romulans we had Romans, and we've had different cultures modeled on those of ancient Earth, but I tried to think of what the Klingon society would be like. The Japanese came to mind, so basically that's what it was, with the Sacred Emperor, the Warlord and so on.

Particularly emphasized in Star Trek films and series after The Motion Picture, the Klingon culture is depicted as being centered on honor and combat. The High Council, led by a Chancellor (in theory, a steward for the mythical office of Emperor), governs the Klingon Empire. The physical position of the Emperor was re-established in practice in the 24th century, largely as a figurehead.

== Sexuality ==
Klingon mating rituals involve dominant and combative attitudes and rituals. In the constructed Klingon language, parmaqqaypu' (singular parmaqqay) are chosen mates for dedicated recreational sexual congress. As The Doctor from Voyager commented, it is considered a good omen if a clavicle is broken during the wedding night. In Star Trek films and series, a Klingon biting someone indicates their desire to mate.

In the Star Trek: The Next Generation episode "The Dauphin", Worf states that the mating ritual consists of a woman roaring, throwing things at the male, and occasionally clawing at him while the male reads love poetry and "ducks a lot". Klingons are known to have sexual relations with humans, with the character B'Elanna Torres being an example of a Klingon-human hybrid; Torres' mother is a Klingon. In the Next Generation episode "Justice", Worf states that he must resist his urges for "general sex" as the only women available to him are human females, who are more "fragile" than Klingon women. During Worf's time as a member of the crew of Deep Space Nine, he and Jadzia Dax develop a romantic relationship and eventually marry. Worf sees sexual relations between mates as a deeply spiritual activity and views sex without being formally mated to be dishonorable, though it's not known if this is a widely held societal belief among Klingons or simply Worf's personal stance.

In the 2026 series Star Trek: Starfleet Academy, the character Jay-Den Kraag is noted as Star Trek's first depiction of an openly gay Klingon.

== Religion ==
According to legend, Kortar, the "first" Klingon, and his mate were created in a place called QI'tu'. The two destroyed the gods who made them and turned the heavens into ashes. This event is recounted in marriage ceremonies through the following singular passage:

"With fire and steel did the gods forge the Klingon heart. So fiercely did it beat, so loud was the sound, that the gods cried out, 'On this day, we have brought forth the strongest heart in all the heavens. None can stand before it without trembling at its strength.' But then the Klingon heart weakened, its steady rhythm faltered, and the gods said, 'Why do you weaken so? We have made you the strongest in all of creation. 'And the heart said... 'I am alone. 'And the gods knew that they had erred. So, they went back to their forge and brought forth another heart. But the second heart beat stronger than the first, and the first was jealous of its power. Fortunately, wisdom had softened the second heart. 'If we join together, no force can stop us.' And when the two hearts began to beat together, they filled the heavens with a terrible sound. For the first time, the gods knew fear. They tried to flee, but it was too late. The Klingon hearts destroyed the gods who created them and turned the heavens to ashes. To this day, no one can oppose the beating of two Klingon hearts."

In the episode "Barge of the Dead" on Star Trek: Voyager, B'Elanna Torres envisioned the Barge of the Dead in penance for the dishonor her Klingon mother, Miral, felt for not raising her half-human daughter to be a Klingon warrior of the Way of Kahless. As she attempted (successfully) to escape going to Gre'Thor, the realm of the dishonored dead, B'Elanna met Kortar, whose fate when he died was to ferry Klingon souls over the River of Blood, to Gre'Thor's gates. There the demonic being Fek'lhr waited to consume particularly loathsome souls.

In the TNG episode "Rightful Heir", the clone of Kahless refers to a Klingon legend, telling of his return near a star that is visible from the night sky of the Klingon homeworld. This, combined with the Klingons' strong religious tradition, could suggest that religious beliefs might have been a driving force behind early Klingon space travel. However, several sources from the Star Trek: Deep Space Nine universe have stated that space travel was one of the legacies left behind by the marauding Hur'q, who pillaged the Klingon home world of Qo'nos, taking with them the sacred treasures of the Klingons, including the Sword of Kahless. Kahless's star has at least one planet orbiting it, and the first Klingons who landed there built a monastery. Warriors that came after having visited, hoping to receive enlightenment through a vision of Kahless.

=== Afterlife ===
Klingons who follow the Way of the Warrior, the belief system developed by Kahless the Unforgettable, value honor above all else. Those who die with purpose and honor are said to join Kahless, who had been the first Klingon emperor and a messianic figure in the Way of the Warrior, in the Black Fleet in Sto'Vo'Kor, a paradise where battle and feasting can eternally be shared and won. Sto'Vo'Kor is similar to Valhalla in Earth's Viking culture. In regard to "Honor" their society is based on war and combat; ritual suicide is often preferred over living life as a crippled warrior, and may allow a warrior to die with honor. To be captured rather than killed in battle brings dishonor to not only the captive but to their descendants, who are considered "tainted" for two following generations. The only ways to overcome the shame of capture are either to commit suicide or to continue to fight the captors until death-even Klingon enemies recognize the deep level of a Klingon personal honor ("By Inferno's Light", Star Trek Deep Space Nine). Those who commit treason are either put to a slow death by the Klingon High Council or their descendants are "tainted" for six following generations, or are discomandated as social outcasts by Klingon society; the only right left to Klingon social outcasts is the "Right of Vengeance" (a duel to the death).

The honored dead are not mourned but celebrated. The eyes of a dead warrior are opened, and all fellow Klingons present roar to tell the warriors in Sto'Vo'Kor that the warrior is joining them. The body of the dead warrior is viewed mainly as an empty shell to be disposed of; particularly well-respected warriors have their companions accompany the body for interment or disposal, "just" to keep away predators (though this is a privately held act of respect for the departed). The surviving mate and his or her companions might undertake a perilous quest in the name of a warrior who may be unsure of their eligibility to enter Sto'Vo'Kor because they did not pass away in valiant battle. If they win their stated deed or battle, they win honor for their late warrior and entry to paradise. To die of natural causes is looked upon as a horrible way to end one's life (The Royale: Star Trek The Next Generation). While the Klingon's greatest honor is to die in battle [Booby Trap, Star Trek The Next Generation; Once More into the Breach, Deep Space Nine], even in midst of a Klingon Civil War, sometimes on a neutral part of the Klingon home world, enemies will show their prowess as warriors by routinely head butting each other, or even sharing the Klingon beverage Blood wine (knowing full well that they would kill each other in battle). To decline to drink bloodwine and pour it on the ground signals that the Klingon opposite another Klingon are blood enemies as is calling an Klingon opponent a 'traitor" and backhanding him across the face (A warning that one or the other will be killed in personal combat) [Sins of the Father, Star Trek: The Next Generation). To kill an opponent not by honorable dueling but by other means such as poison is considered dishonorable for a Klingon warrior [Reunion Star Trek: The Next Generation].The War Cry of the Klingons is "Long Live the Klingon Empire!"[Once More into the Breach Deep Space Nine]

Klingon beliefs were recorded in a series of scrolls collectively referred to as the paq'batlh, or Book of Honor. One prophecy, possibly taken from this book, was of the Kuvah'magh, a religious figure predicted to appear at some future time. Miral Paris, daughter of Tom Paris and B'Elanna Torres, was thought by some expatriate Klingon cult members in the Delta Quadrant to be this new spiritual leader.

Gre'Thor (in Klingon, ghe'tor or 'ghe"or) is the Klingon afterlife where the dishonored go when they die. It is the Klingon equivalent of hell and is guarded by a fearsome demon, Fek'lhr (roughly pronounced "Fek-Lar"; in Klingon, veqlargh). Fek'lhr and his demons are responsible for the eternal torture of those unfortunate Klingons who find themselves in Gre'Thor; however, Klingon legend allows for the salvation of souls from Gre'Thor, typically through heroic sacrifices made by friends and family (Kahless, for instance, once willingly traveled to Gre'Thor to save his brother, Morath, and send him to Sto'Vo'Kor).

If a Klingon dies and is fated to journey to Gre'Thor, they will find themselves on the Barge of the Dead, which travels the "river of blood" on its way to Gre'Thor. Klingon souls on the barge are tempted by siren-like voices, masquerading as friends and family, who try to lure them off the edge and into the river where they are torn apart forever [Barge of the Dead Star Trek Voyager].

Under normal circumstances, it is difficult for the souls of dead Klingons to leave Gre'Thor, as in the expression "I will surrender when spirits escape from Gre'Thor!", but the legend of Kahless does allow for such things. Another example is the mother of B'Elanna Torres, who was initially sent to Gre'Thor due to her daughter's misdeeds but was eventually released.[Barge of the Dead Star Trek Voyager].

== Recreational activities ==
=== Martial arts ===
moQbara (mok'bara) is the name of the fictional Klingon martial art. It is sometimes practiced with a bat'leth, an edged weapon with a curved blade, four points and handholds on the back.

The style is similar to tai chi and was invented for Star Trek by visual effects producer and martial artist Dan Curry.

=== Opera ===
Klingon opera is a well-known genre of traditional Klingon music with certain dramatic and stylistic similarities to Human opera. Typical themes include passionate tales of doomed courage and star-crossed love. Its strident tones are considered ear-shattering by most non-Klingons.

Klingons are passionate about opera, which they use to combine battle with art. The opera 'u', retelling the legend of the battles of "Kahless the Unforgettable", is the first (real) Earth production of a Klingon opera.

== Food ==
- bahgol – Beverage best served warm.
- Klingon bloodwine – A red wine, of which Worf had programmed the replicators on the Enterprise-D to create a close approximation. It was also available at Quark's on Deep Space Nine. It is best served warm, and is the traditional beverage consumed by warriors being inducted into the Order of the Bat'leth.
- bregit lung – A traditional Klingon dish that William Riker said he enjoyed when he briefly served aboard the Klingon ship Pagh.
- chech'tluth – Alcoholic beverage Worf offered to Danilo Odell, the leader of a Bringloidi colony, when hosting that colony's population.
- fire wine – Alcoholic beverage Worf once unsuccessfully tried to order in a fictional tavern in a holographic Old West simulation.
- gagh – Serpent worms. Klingons prefer to eat them live.
- pipius claw – Traditional dish that William Riker sampled when studying Klingon culture before his brief assignment aboard the Pagh.
- racht – Klingon serpent worms, larger than gagh, but served in a manner similar to them. Like gagh, they are best served live.
- raktajino – Klingon coffee available at Quark's bar on Deep Space Nine, sometimes served iced. Station personnel who were fond of the beverage included Commander Benjamin Sisko, Commander Jadzia Dax and Major Kira Nerys, who liked hers extra hot with Bajoran kava.
- rokeg blood pie – Traditional Klingon dish. The crew of the Pagh served it to William Riker when he briefly served aboard that vessel, as a sort of initiation rite. Riker proved his mettle by stating that he enjoyed it. It is also a favorite food of Worf's, whose adoptive mother mastered the technique of making it when he was a child. In the Star Trek: Voyager episode Day of Honor, Neelix serves it to B'Elanna Torres, revealing that he looked up Klingon traditions and discovered it is served during the Klingon Day of Honor.
- Klingon skull stew – Delicacy sold at the Replimat on Deep Space Nine. The dish's name was not mentioned onscreen, though a photo of it, created by scenic artist Doug Drexler, was seen on a Replimat wall.
- targ – A boar-like beast with sharp tusks, native to Qo'noS. Klingons both hunt the animal for food and keep it as a pet.
- warnog – A Klingon ale that dates back at least as early as the time of Kahless.
- zilm'kach – A segmented orange food eaten by Klingons.

== Reference books ==
The main reference book to Klingon culture as depicted in the Klingon language is Klingon for the Galactic Traveler by Marc Okrand (Pocket Books, New York, 1997). A collection of Klingon proverbs and sayings reflecting and describing Klingon culture is contained in The Klingon Way: A Warrior's Guide, by Marc Okrand (Pocket Books, New York, 1996).

== See also ==
- Klingon language
- The Klingon Hamlet
