= List of Star Trek reference books =

This is a list of reference books on the subject(s) of Star Trek, which does not include fan-published works. For more details on in-universe technical manuals, please see List of Star Trek technical manuals.

Year	Title	Author	Subject(s)	ISBN
1968	The Making of Star Trek	Stephen E. Whitfield, Gene Roddenberry	Behind the Scenes	ISBN 0-345-31554-5
1968–1976	Star Trek Concordance: First edition	Dorothy J. Heydt, Bjo Trimble	General	ISBN 0-345-25137-7
1980	Star Trek Spaceflight Chronology		In-universe	ISBN 0-671-79089-7
1975	Star Trek Star Fleet Technical Manual	Franz Joseph	Technology	ISBN 0-345-34074-4
1991	Star Trek: The Next Generation Technical Manual		Technology	ISBN 0-671-70427-3
1992	The Klingon Dictionary		Language	ISBN 0-671-74559-X
1993	Star Trek Compendium		General	ISBN 0-671-79612-7
1994	The Making of Star Trek Deep Space Nine	Garfield and Judith Reeves-Stevens	Behind the Scenes	ISBN 0-671-87430-6
1995	Star Trek Concordance: Second edition	Bjo Trimble	General	ISBN 0-8065-1610-0
1995	The Ferengi Rules of Acquisition		Culture	ISBN 0-671-52936-6
1996	The Klingon Way: A Warrior's Guide		Culture	ISBN 0-671-53755-5
1996	Star Trek Chronology: The History of the Future		In-universe	ISBN 0-671-53610-9
1997	The Art of Star Trek		Art and Visuals	ISBN 0-671-01776-4
1997	The Federation Travel Guide		Cartography; Culture	ISBN 0-671-00978-8
1997	Klingon for the Galactic Traveller		Language	ISBN 0-671-00995-8
1997	Legends of the Ferengi		Culture	ISBN 0-671-00728-9
1997	Star Trek Phase II: The Making of the Lost Series		Episode & Series Guides	ISBN 0-671-56839-6
1997	Star Trek Sketchbook: The Original Series		Art and Visuals	ISBN 0-671-00219-8
1998	The Continuing Mission		Episode & Series Guides	ISBN 0-671-02559-7
1998	Star Trek: Deep Space Nine Technical Manual		Technology	ISBN 0-671-01563-X
1998	Star Trek: The Next Generation Sketchbook: The Movies Generations and First Contact		Behind the Scenes	ISBN 0-671-00892-7
1998	A Vision of the Future: Star Trek Voyager		Art and Visuals	ISBN 0-671-53481-5
1999	The Star Trek Encyclopedia		General	ISBN 0-671-53609-5
2000	Star Trek: Deep Space Nine Companion		Episode & Series Guides	ISBN 0-671-50106-2
2000	Star Trek: The Human Frontier		Sociology	ISBN 978-0415929820
2001	Star Trek Starship Spotter		Starships	ISBN 0-7434-3725-X
2002	Starfleet Survival Guide		General	ISBN 0-7434-1842-5
2002	Star Trek Star Charts: The Complete Atlas of Star Trek		Cartography	ISBN 0-7434-3770-5
2003	Star Trek Voyager Companion		Episode & Series Guides	ISBN 0-7434-1751-8
2003	Star Trek: The Next Generation Companion		Episode & Series Guides	ISBN 0-7434-5798-6
2006	Voyages of Imagination		General	ISBN 1-4165-0349-8
2007	Ships of the Line		Starships	ISBN 1-4165-3243-9
2010	Star Trek: The Original Series 365		General	ISBN 978-0-8109-9172-9
2013	These Are The Voyages: TOS, Season One		Behind the Scenes	ISBN 978-0-9892-3811-3
2014	These Are The Voyages: TOS, Season Two		Behind the Scenes	ISBN 978-0-9892-3814-4
2015	These Are The Voyages: TOS, Season Three		Behind the Scenes	ISBN 978-0-9892-3817-5
2016	To Boldly Go: Rare Photos from the TOS Soundstage - Season One		Behind the Scenes	ISBN 978-0-6926438-5-3
2016	To Boldly Go: Rare Photos from the TOS Soundstage - Season Two		Behind the Scenes	ISBN 978-0-6927567-1-3
2017	To Boldly Go: Rare Photos from the TOS Soundstage - Season Three		Behind the Scenes	ISBN 978-0-6928654-6-0
