= Klingon grammar =

Grammar of the constructed Klingon language

The grammar of the Klingon language was created by Marc Okrand for the Star Trek franchise. He first described it in his book The Klingon Dictionary. It is a nominative–accusative, primarily suffixing agglutinative language, and has an object–verb–subject word order. The Klingon language has a number of unusual grammatical features, as it was designed to sound and seem alien, but it has an extremely regular morphology.

== Word order ==
Klingon follows an object–verb–subject word order. Adverbs usually go at the beginning of the sentence and prepositional phrases go before the object.

Doʼ Duj - Daq ghoqwIʼ Sam laʼ
fortunately ship + LOC spy find commander
Fortunately, the commander found the spy aboard the ship

Sentences can be treated as objects, and the word ʼeʼ is placed after the sentence. ʼeʼ is treated as the object of the next sentence. The adverbs, indirect objects and locatives of the latter sentence go after the subject, but before the ʼeʼ

bI - pIv ʼeʼ vI - tuʼ
you-Ø‍ + {be healthy} that I-it + observe
I see that you're healthy (lit. I observe that you are healthy)

== Nouns ==
Klingon has three noun classes. The first one is living beings with an innate capacity to use language. The second one is body parts (not the body itself) and the third is all other nouns. Klingon has no articles, so the word raS table can mean a table or the table. The difference between the two is inferred from context.

=== Suffixes ===
There are five types of noun suffixes. A word cannot have two suffixes of the same type. The suffixes are ordered based on type number; a type 2 suffix goes before a type 3 suffix, but after a type 1 suffix. In the following example, all five suffix types are used in the correct order.

veng - Hom - mey - qoq - chaj - Daq
city + DIM + PL + DUB + their + LOC
in their so-called villages

==== Type 1 (size, affection) ====
This type has three suffixes:

- The augmentative suffix-ʼaʼ,

ghom → ghomʼaʼ
group {} crowd

- The diminutive suffix -Hom,

yuQ → yuQHom
planet {} planetoid

- and the endearment suffix -oy.

vav → vavoy
father {} daddy

- If the noun to which the endearment suffix is added ends with a vowel, a glottal stop is inserted between them:

ghu → ghuʼoy
baby {} {dear baby}

==== Type 2 (plurals) ====
This type of suffix forms plurals. There are three suffixes, one for each noun class.

- The suffix -puʼ is for beings capable of using language.

qetwIʼ → qetwIʼpuʼ
runner {} runners

- The suffix -Duʼ is for body parts,

ghop → ghopDuʼ
hand {} hands

- The suffix -mey is used for all other nouns.

quS → quSmey
chair {} chairs

- When -mey is used for nouns that would normally take -puʼ or -Duʼ, it carries the connotation of being all over the place.

ghot → ghotmey
person {} {people all over the place}

A noun does not require a plural suffix if a pronoun, pronominal prefix, or context serves to indicate that it is plural, or if it is being used in conjunction with a number.

Duypuʼ chaH or Duy chaH
They are emissaries.
raSmey DIghor or raS DIghor
We broke the tables.

==== Type 3 (accuracy) ====
This type of suffix indicates the speaker's opinion of the applicability of the noun. There are three suffixes:

- The suffix -qoq indicates that the speaker thinks what they are referencing is not actually represented by the noun.

QaH → QaHqoq
{the help} {} {the so-called help}

- The dubitative suffix -Hey indicates the speaker is not entirely sure if the object they are referencing is represented by the noun.

choH → choHHey
change {} {apparent change}

- The suffix -naʼ indicates that the speaker is entirely sure that the object is represented accurately by the noun.

jup → jupnaʼ
friend {} {true friend}

==== Type 4 (possession, determiners) ====
This type of suffix indicates possession or specifies which object is referred to. It contains twelve suffixes.

There are ten possession suffixes, indicating who is the possessor of the object, which may be a person. For first- and second-person possessors, there are different forms depending on whether the "object" is a being capable of using language.

Possessives	1st-person singular	2nd-person singular	3rd-person singular	1st-person plural	2nd-person plural	3rd-person plural
Not capable of using language	-wIj	-lIj	-Daj	-maj	-raj	-chaj
Capable of using language	-wIʼ	-lIʼ	-Daj	-maʼ	-raʼ	-chaj

There are also two determiner suffixes:

- -vam this indicates an object that is nearby or that is being discussed
- -vetlh that indicates an object that is not nearby or that had previously been discussed

Examples:

- Non-language-user possessives:

nav → navwIj
paper {} {my paper}

- Language-user possessives:

qeSwIʼpuʼ → qeSwIʼpuʼlIʼ
advisors {} {your advisors}

- Determiners:

Soj → Sojvam
food {} {this food}

==== Type 5 (syntactic role) ====
This type of suffix serves a syntactic role in the sentence. It contains five suffixes.

- The locative suffix -Daq indicates the action of the sentence is taking place in, at or on the noun. With certain verbs, it indicates motion towards the noun.

juHmaj → juHmajDaq
{our home} {} {in our home}

- The ablative suffix -voʼ indicates that the action is taking place away from the noun. Again, with certain verbs, it indicates motion away from the noun.

qoj → qojvoʼ
cliff {} {away from the cliff}

- The causal suffix -moʼ indicates that the action is occurring because of the noun.

ghuʼ → ghuʼmoʼ
situation {} {because of the situation}

- The dative/benefactive suffix -vaD indicates the indirect object, and/or the noun for which the action has been done.

jeʼwIʼ → jeʼwIʼvaD
buyer {} {to/for the buyer}

- The topicalizing suffix -ʼeʼ indicates the topic of the sentence or emphasises the noun in the phrase, and also marks the head noun of a relative clause.

== Verbs ==
Klingon verbs mark for aspect but not for tense, which is indicated where necessary by context and by time adverbs. Prefixes mark subject and object. There are ten types of suffix, and as with nouns, a verb can have no more than one suffix of any type. (The tenth type, called rovers, are an exception.) Again as with nouns, the types of suffix must appear in a strict order, indicated by their type number: a type 2 suffix goes before a type 3 suffix, but after a type 1 suffix. A rover suffix can go between any of them.

Unlike English, there is no infinitive. The presentation of the verb stem as an infinitive in this article's example sentences is just to show the individual morphemes.

=== Prefixes ===
Klingon verb prefixes mark both the subject and the object.

Verb prefixes
		Object						
		No object	1st person singular	2nd person singular	3rd person singular	1st person plural	2nd person plural	3rd person plural
Subject	1st person singular	jI-	—	qa-	vI-	—	Sa-	vI-
Subject	2nd person singular	bI-	cho-	—	Da-	ju-	—	Da-
Subject	3rd person singular	Ø-	mu-	Du-	Ø-	nu-	lI-	Ø-
Subject	1st person plural	ma-	—	pI-	wI-	—	re-	DI-
Subject	2nd person plural	Su-	tu-	—	bo-	che-	—	bo-
Subject	3rd person plural	Ø-	mu-	nI-	lu-	nu-	lI-	Ø-
Subject	unspecified*	Ø-	vI-	Da-	Ø-	wI-	bo-	lu-

* Expressed with the type-5 verb suffix -luʼ

Legend	Meaning
—	Not represented
Ø-	Null prefix

Imperative-mood prefixes
		Object				
		No object	1st person singular	3rd person singular	1st person plural	3rd person plural
Subject	2nd person singular	yI-	HI-	yI-	gho-	tI-
Subject	2nd person plural	pe-	HI-	yI-	gho-	tI-

Prefixes must be present even if the nouns or pronouns they reference are declared explicitly. In certain cases with a third person object, a first or second person indirect object can be omitted by using the first and second person object prefixes instead. This is known as the prefix trick.

Examples:

- No object:

Qong → jIQong
sleep {} {I sleep}

- Subject and object:

nuQ → DunuQ
annoy {} {It annoys you}

- Imperative:

laD → yIlaD
read {} {Read it}

=== Suffixes ===
==== Type 1 (reflexive/reciprocal) ====
This type of suffix forms reflexive verbs. There are two suffixes.

- The reflexive suffix -ʼegh indicates that the individual subject(s) does/do the action to her/him/itself/themselves.

jIlegh → jIleghʼegh
{I see} {} {I see myself}

maʼang → maʼangʼegh
{We reveal} {} {We reveal ourselves (individually)}

- The reciprocal suffix -chuq indicates that the individual subjects do the action to each other. Intransitive verbs cannot take this suffix.

Sulegh → Suleghchuq
{You(pl) see} {} {You(pl) see each other}

==== Type 2 (volition/necessity) ====
This type of suffix deals with the subject's volition. There are five suffixes.

- The suffix -nIS indicates that the subject is required to or has the necessity to complete the action.

chojaʼ → chojaʼnIS
{You tell me} {} {You need to tell me}

- The suffix -qang indicates that the subject is willing to perform the action.

lungev → lungevqang
{They sell it} {} {They are willing to sell it}

- The suffix -rup indicates the subject is prepared to complete the action.

{ghuʼ poj} → {ghuʼ pojrup}
{He/She analyzes the situation} {} {He/She is ready to analyze the situation}

- The suffix -beH indicates that the subject has been set up to complete the action. -beH is used with devices, whereas -rup is used with beings.

{ghoghlIj qon} → {ghoghlIj qonbeH}
{It records your voice} {} {It is ready to record your voice}

- The suffix -vIp indicates that the subject is afraid to do the action.

bImej → bImejvIp
{You leave} {} {You are afraid to leave}

==== Type 3 (inceptive/inchoative) ====
This type of suffix describes the action of the verb. There are two suffixes.

- The suffix -choH indicates a change of state to that indicated by the verb:

yIt → yItchoH
{He/she/it walks} {} {He/she/it starts walking}

Doq → DoqchoH
{It is red} {} {It becomes red}

- The suffix -qaʼ indicates the action had been stopped, but is now resuming, or that the action is being performed again.

yIQong → yIQongqaʼ
Sleep! {} {Go back to sleep!}

==== Type 4 (causative) ====
There is only one suffix in this category, the causative suffix -moH. This suffix indicates that the subject is causing something to happen. If the verb to which it is added is transitive, the object becomes the indirect object. Many Klingon words are derived this way. For example, the verb clean (SayʼmoH) is derived from the verb be clean (Sayʼ).

Intransitive verb:

poS lojmIt
{be open} door
The door is open.

Causative form:

lojmIt poS - moH qup
door {be open} + CAUS elder
The elder opened the door. (lit. The elder caused the door to be open.)

Transitive verb:

paq Da - nej
book you-it + {look for}
You look/are looking for the book. (lit. You look for the book.)

Causative form:

paq qa - nej - moH
book I-you + {look for} + CAUS
I made you look for the book. (lit. I caused you to look for the book.)

==== Type 5 (undefined subject; capability) ====
There are two unrelated suffixes in this group. The suffix -luʼ indicates an undefined subject. The verb prefixes that are normally used for first or second person subject with third person singular object are used to indicate first or second person object. The suffix -laH indicates that the subject is capable of performing the action of the verb.

Examples:

- -luʼ without prefix:

much bej - luʼ
presentation watch + {INDF SBJ}
the presentation is watched, someone watches the presentation (Note: -luʼ is not the same thing as the passive voice. -luʼ makes the subject indefinite, and keeps the object where it would be if it had a subject. Unlike the passive voice, it does not make the subject the patient of the verb, except when using the verb prefixes)

much bej
He/she watches the presentation

- -luʼ with prefix:

vI - tlhaʼ - luʼ
I-it + chase + {INDF SBJ}
I am chased, someone chases me

vItlhaʼ
I chase it

- -laH:

vI - bom - laH
I-it + sing + {able to}
I can sing it

==== Type 6 (perfection; uncertainty) ====
This type indicates the speaker's opinion of the action of the verb. There are four suffixes.

- The suffix -chuʼ indicates that the speaker considers the action is done in the best possible manner.

pIQoy → pIQoychuʼ
{we hear you} {} {we hear you clearly}

- The suffix -bej indicates that the speaker is completely sure the action is occurring.

SuQeH → SuQeHbej
{you (plural) are angry} {} {you are definitely angry}

- The dubitative suffix -lawʼ indicates that the speaker thinks the action is occurring, but is not sure.

luyaj → luyajlawʼ
{they understand it} {} {they seem to understand it}

- The suffix -baʼ indicates that the speaker thinks that it is obvious that the action is occurring.

lupar → luparbaʼ
{they dislike it} {} {they obviously dislike it}

==== Type 7 (aspect) ====
This type indicates the verb's aspect. There are four Type 7 suffixes.

Note that aspect is different from tense and independent of it. A "completed" event (perfective aspect, -puʼ or -taʼ) can just as easily be set before, during, or after the time of description (past, present, or future tense), or unspecified for tense. For simplicity, this section says "is completed", not "was, is, or will be completed." (Do not confuse perfective aspect with "perfectly done".)

- The perfective suffix -puʼ indicates that, in the time context of the sentence, the action is completed.

qaS → qaSpuʼ
{It occurs} {} {It has occurred}

vIghor → vIghorpuʼ
{I break it} {} {I have broken it}

- The suffix -taʼ also indicates that the action is completed, and further specifies that it was done on purpose.

{Qu' QIj} → {Qu' QIjtaʼ}
{She explains the mission} {} {She has explained the mission}

vIghor → vIghortaʼ
{I break it} {} {I have broken it (on purpose)}

- The suffix -taH indicates that the verb is occurring continuously.

jItlhuH → jItlhuHtaH
{I breathe} {} {I keep breathing}

- The suffix -lIʼ indicates that the verb is occurring continuously, but that it has a definite ending point.

{megh vIvut} → {megh vIvutlIʼ}
{I prepare lunch} {} {I am preparing lunch}

The perfective aspect can also be indicated by the use of the verb form rIntaH after the main verb. This carries the connotation of irreversibility.

ghorluʼ rIntaH It has been broken (and it cannot be mended)

==== Type 8 (honorific) ====
There is only one suffix in this group, the honorific suffix -neS. It is used when addressing any type of superior, be it social, political, or military, and only when being very polite or having high regard for that person. It is never required.

-neS:

qaqIH → qaqIHneS
{I meet you} {} {I am honoured to meet you}

==== Type 9 (syntactic) ====
Eleven suffixes specify syntactic roles in the sentence.

===== Nominalizers =====
Two suffixes form specific types of noun from a verb.

- The suffix -wIʼ is used to form words for persons and things that do something, much as English nouns of the form X-er can mean either "person who does X" (listener, baker) or "thing that does X" (screwdriver, sprinkler).

ʼIj → ʼIjwIʼ
listen {} listener

woch → wochwIʼ
{be tall} {} {tall person or tall thing}

- The suffix -ghach is used as a nominalizer for verbs ending in suffixes, which otherwise are unable to be nominalized. This suffix is usually used with other suffixes and is rarely found alone with the verb stem.

QallaH → QallaHghach
{be able to swim} {} {the ability to swim}

pIvchoH → pIvchoHghach
{become healthy} {} {becoming healthy}

===== Modals =====
These two suffixes inflect the verb in specific grammatical moods.

- The interrogative suffix -ʼaʼ is used to form yes–no questions.

DIboQnIS → DIboQnISʼaʼ
{We need to assist them} {} {Do we need to assist them?}

- The optative suffix -jaj is used to indicate a wish or desire of the speaker.

bIQap → bIQapjaj
{You succeed} {} {May you succeed}

===== Subordinators =====
The following seven suffixes are used to form subordinate clauses. A subordinate clause may go after or before the clause it modifies.

Time

- The suffix -paʼ indicates that the event described in the main clause occurs chronologically before the event of this clause.

jItlheDpaʼ, HIboQ Before I depart, assist me
(jItlheD I depart, HIboQ assist me)

- The suffix -vIS indicates that the main clause is occurring at the same time as this clause. It is always used in conjunction with the type-7 suffix continuous suffix -taH.

lumtaHvIS, pagh taʼ He accomplishes nothing while he procrastinates
(lum procrastinate, taʼ accomplish, pagh nothing)

- The suffix -DIʼ indicates that the event of the main clause occurs immediately after the event of this clause is completed.

jImej chocholDIʼ As soon as you approach me, I leave
(jImej I leave, chochol you approach me)

Cause and effect

- The suffix -chugh is used to form conditionals.

DaSamlaHchugh, DaSuqlaH If you can find it, you can take it
(DaSamlaH you can find it, DaSuqlaH you can acquire (take) it)

- The suffix -moʼ indicates the main clause is occurring because of this clause.

bIʼIlmoʼ, qavoq Because you are sincere, I trust you
(bIʼIl you are sincere, qavoq I trust you)

(Relative and purpose clauses)

- The suffix -bogh is used in relative clauses. Their usage is covered in the relative clauses section.
- The suffix -meH is used in purpose clauses. Their usage is covered in the purpose clauses section.

==== Rovers ====
This type of suffix is known as a lengwIʼ in Klingon, which is translated as rover (leng wander + wIʼ). There are four rovers. These suffixes have no defined position, and can go after the verb stem or after any suffix – even another rover – except after a type-9 suffix or where the result would be meaningless. They modify whatever directly precedes them.

- The rover suffix -beʼ negates what precedes it but in the imperative mood -Qoʼ is used.

wInaD → wInaDbeʼ
{We praise it} {} {We do not praise it}

boʼollaH → boʼollaHbeʼ
{You are able to verify it} {} {You are not able to verify it}

- The rover suffix -Qoʼ negates what precedes it in the imperative mood. In the indicative mood it indicates refusal by the subject. It can only be used between verb suffixes of Type 8 and Type 9.

yIQIp → yIQIpQoʼ
{Be stupid} {} {don't be stupid}

vIlon → vIlonQoʼ
{I abandon it} {} {I refuse to abandon it}

- The rover suffix -quʼ emphasises what precedes it.

narghqang → narghqangquʼ
{He is willing to escape} {} {He is really willing to escape}

- The rover suffix -Haʼ reverses what precedes it; that is, it indicates that the opposite of what precedes it is being done, or that the action is being undone. If used on a verb that cannot be undone and has no meaningful opposite, it means to perform the action wrongly, not in the proper way, somewhat like the English prefix mis- in misspeak, mistype, misspell, etc. Unlike the other rovers, it can be placed only just after the stem; its classification in the rover category is attributed to the insistence of fictional Klingon grammarians.

yIchuʼ → yIchuʼHaʼ
{Activate it} {} {De-activate it}

boloʼ → boloʼHaʼ
{you (plural) use it} {} {you (pl.) misuse it}

bIQuch → bIQuchHaʼ
{You are happy} {} {You are unhappy}

The position of the rover suffixes affects the meaning of the word. Contrast

luSoplaH They are able to eat it
luSoplaHbeʼ They are not able to eat it
luSopbeʼlaH They are able to not eat it

(In context, possibly equivalent to They can refuse to eat it)

luSopbeʼlaHbeʼ They are not able to not eat it

(In context, possibly equivalent to They cannot refuse to eat it)

=== Pronouns and copula ===
Klingon has no verb that corresponds to the verb to be; the concept is expressed using a different grammatical construction. Pronouns can be used as verbs that act as the pronoun plus the verb to be. The pronoun can take verb suffixes, which then modify the pronoun like any other verb. A third-person subject that is not a pronoun must go after the pronoun-verb and carry the type-5 noun suffix -ʼeʼ

Pronouns	1st-person singular	2nd-person singular	3rd-person singular	1st-person plural	2nd-person plural	3rd-person plural
Capable of using language	jIH	SoH	ghaH	maH	tlhIH	chaH
Not capable of using language	jIH	SoH	ʼoH	maH	tlhIH	bIH

Examples:

- qonwI' tlhIH You are composers
- ghojwIʼ ghaH HaDwIʼʼeʼ A studier is a learner

== Adjectives ==
Klingon does not have adjectives as a distinct part of speech. Instead, many intransitive verbs can be used as adjectives, in which case they follow the noun they modify. Contrast (wep coat, and yIQ be wet)

wep yIQ
the wet coat

with

yIQ wep.
The coat is wet.

In this construction, the only verbal suffixes allowed are rover suffixes such as -quʼ and -Haʼ. Type-5 noun suffixes that would normally be attached to the noun are instead attached to the adjectival verb:

paʼDaq
in the room
paʼ tInDaq
in the big room (tIn big)

== Adverbs ==
Adverbs are usually placed at the beginning of the sentence, but time adverbs go before other adverbs.

wa'leS ghaytan nu - jatlh
tomorrow likely they-us + speak
They will probably speak to us tomorrow.

Adverbs can take the rover suffix -Haʼ to denote the opposite adverbial.

Doʼ
fortunately
DoʼHaʼ
unfortunately

== Conjunctions ==
Klingon has seven conjunctions, and they are different for nouns and for sentences. The noun conjunctions are je for a logical conjunction (and), joq for a logical disjunction (and/or) and ghap for an exclusive disjunction (either/or). Noun conjunctions go after the nouns they connect. Sentence conjunctions are the reverses of the noun conjunctions; ʼej for and, qoj for and/or, and pagh for either/or. ʼach (or ʼa) (but) is used to contrast sentences.

== Clauses ==
=== Relative clauses ===
In a relative clause, the verb has the type-9 verb suffix -bogh added to it. The order of the words in relative clauses remains the same as in regular clauses, but the head noun may optionally get the type-5 suffix -ʼeʼ added.

chuS Saj ngev - bogh ghot - -ʼeʼ
{to be noisy} pet sell + REL person + FOC
The person who sells the pet is noisy

chuS Saj + -ʼeʼ ngev - bogh ghot
{be noisy} pet + FOC sell {} REL person
The pet which the person sells is noisy

Since there is already a type-5 noun suffix marking the head noun, nothing other than the subject or the object can be marked as head noun. Two sentences are formed instead to form the same idea. Relative clauses can have nouns with type 5 suffixes as modifiers, but it can be ambiguous as they can be misinterpreted as being part of the main sentence.

=== Purpose clauses ===
A purpose clause expresses the reason or goal of the action of the main clause. If it is modifying a noun it states the purpose of the noun. A purpose clause always goes before the clause or noun it modifies. This is the cause of some grammatical ambiguity in Klingon, as a -meH modifying a noun at the beginning of a sentence can be misinterpreted as modifying the entire sentence. This can be resolved in writing with punctuation.

- -meH with sentence:

ju - mer - meH, bI - Soʼ - ʼegh
you-us + surprise + purpose you + hide + self
You hid yourself in order to surprise us.

- -meH with nouns:

QaQ vI - Dub - meH qech - lIj
{be good} I-it + improve + purpose idea + your
Your idea on how I should improve it is good/Your idea for improving it is good. (lit. Your idea [for I improve it] is good)

== Comparatives ==
In this section, noun phrases are indicated by the abbreviation NP, and adjectives by A.

Klingon comparatives mainly rely on adjectives like lawʼ (to be many), puS (to be few), rap (to be the same), and rur (to resemble, to be like) to contrast the nouns. However, many (but not all) of the comparatives have unusual word orders that don't parse as regular Klingon sentences.

- The main Klingon comparative structure is NP_{1} A lawʼ NP_{2} A puS.
  The general meaning of this construction is "NP_{1} is more A than NP_{2}".

qachvam chuʼ lawʼ juHlIj chu' puS
{this building} {be new} {} {your home} {} {}
This building is newer than your home. (lit. this-building new many – home-your new few)

- The structure NP_{1} A lawʼ Hoch A puS is used to form superlatives, i.e.
  "NP_{1} has the most of quality A (= has more of quality A than anything/one else has)".
  (Hoch = all, everyone, everything)

qIDvetlh tlhaQ law' Hoch tlhaQ puS.
{that joke} {be funny} {} {} {be funny} {}
That joke is the funniest. (lit. joke-that funny many – everything funny few)

- The inverse structure, Hoch A lawʼ NP_{1} A puS is used to indicate
  "NP_{1} has the least of quality A".

Hoch quv lawʼ verengnan quv puS.
{} {be honorable} {} {Ferengi} {} {}
Ferengi are the least honorable. (lit. everyone honorable many – Ferengi honorable few)

- The structure A NP_{1}; NP_{2} rur is used to form similes:
  "NP_{1} is A; he/she/it resembles NP_{2}".

ʼIQ rav rur
{be sad} floor {to resemble}
He is as sad as a floor. (lit. he is sad; he is like a floor)

== Questions ==
A yes–no question in Klingon can be formed by adding the suffix -ʼaʼ to the regular form. The word for yes is HISlaH or HIjaʼ and the word for no is ghobeʼ. Interrogative pronouns go where the answer would normally go, and don't reorder the sentence. Interrogative adverbs go at the beginning of the sentence.

== Numbers ==
Klingon uses a base-10 system to count numbers. To form a multiple of 10, 100, 1 000, 1 000 000, the word for the multiple of ten is suffixed to the digit. For example, chorghmaH eighty is a combination of the word chorgh eight and the number forming suffix -maH ten.

Larger powers go before smaller powers: chorghmaH Soch is eight-ten seven. The number suffix -DIch is used to form ordinal numbers, and the number suffix -logh indicates how many times an action has been repeated: loSDIch fourth, waʼmaH chaʼlogh twelve times.

10	-maH	
100	-vatlh	
1 000	-SaD	-SanID
10 000	-netlh	
100 000	-bIp	
1 000 000	-ʼuyʼ	

0	pagh	5	vagh
1	waʼ	6	jav
2	chaʼ	7	Soch
3	wej	8	chorgh
4	loS	9	Hut

== Sources ==
- Okrand, Marc (1992). The Klingon Dictionary, 2nd Edition. Pocket Books. ISBN 978-0671745592.
- Okrand, Marc. paq'batlh. uitgeverij. 2011.
