= The Klingon Hamlet =

Klingon language version of Hamlet

- Author: William Shakespeare
- Original title: Hamlet Prince of Denmark: The Restored Klingon Version
- Translator: Nick Nicholas; Andrew Strader
- Cover artist: Phil Foglio
- Language: English / Klingon
- Genre: Science fiction
- Publisher: Pocket Books
- Publication date: February 2000
- Publication place: United States
- Media type: Print (Paperback)
- Pages: 219
- ISBN: 0-9644345-1-2 (1st ed.); 0-671-03578-9 (reprint)
- OCLC: 43443445
- Dewey Decimal: 499/.99
- LC Class: PM8415 .S49 2000

The Klingon Hamlet, or The Tragedy of Khamlet, Son of the Emperor of Qo'noS, is a translation of William Shakespeare's Hamlet into Klingon, a constructed language first appearing in the science fiction franchise Star Trek.

The play was translated over several years by Nick Nicholas and Andrew Strader of the "Klingon Shakespeare Restoration Project", with feedback and editorial assistance from Mark Shoulson, d'Armond Speers, and Will Martin. The impetus for the project came from a line from the motion picture Star Trek VI: The Undiscovered Country in which Chancellor Gorkon states, "You have not experienced Shakespeare until you have read him in the original Klingon." According to a disclaimer, the project is written in a satirical style implied by Gorkon's quote—that Shakespeare was actually a Klingon (named "Wil'yam Sheq'spir") writing about an attempted coup in the Klingon Empire.

== Impetus ==
In a scene from the film Star Trek VI a dinner is held for the Klingon chancellor, Gorkon. He makes a toast to "the undiscovered country...the future". Spock, recognising the quotation, responds, "Hamlet, Act 3 Scene 1", to which Gorkon replies with his statement about the "original" Klingon text of Shakespeare. Though Gorkon does not quote from the "original" Klingon text, another character, Chang, quotes the Klingon words "taH pagh taHbe'" (To be, or not to be). The film is filled with other quotations and references to Shakespeare. The phrase "the undiscovered country" is quoted from Hamlet's soliloquy.

The film's director Nicholas Meyer said the idea for having the Klingons claim Shakespeare as their own was based on Nazi Germany's attempt to claim William Shakespeare as German before World War II. A similar scene appears in the wartime British film "Pimpernel" Smith (1941) in which a German general quotes Shakespeare, saying "'To be or not to be', as our great German poet said." The idea had also already been used by Vladimir Nabokov in his novel Pnin, the eponymous hero of which prefers the Russian translation he grew up reading to the inferior English edition: "whenever you were reduced to look up something in the English version, you never found this or that beautiful, noble, sonorous line that you remembered all your life from Kroneberg’s text in Vengerov’s splendid edition. Sad!"

== Style and format ==
The English version of the play appears alongside its "original Klingon" text. The "original Klingon" version differs from the English version in ways that reflect the play's history as supposedly originating from Klingon culture. Reference sections in the book show how literal translations of the Klingon body text have had to be "adapted" to make it intelligible for human readers in the supposedly "translated" English version.

The introduction adopts a faux-academic style, explaining that the Klingon origin of the play is evident from the fact that the plot is based on predominantly Klingon themes and motifs as opposed to human themes and motifs. Human culture was too primitive to have produced such a work during the time period in which it is set. A comparison of the "spontaneous, direct and vibrant verse" of the Klingon version with the "flaccid, ponderous convoluted meanderings" of the English version make it obvious that the latter is a derivative work. The introduction also claims that the notion that Shakespeare was a human poet living in the late 16th century was invented after the United Federation of Planets instigated a large propaganda campaign in order to rally the human population against Klingons, "hoping by this falsification of history to discredit the achievements of Klingon culture". (Compare Shakespeare authorship question.)

== Editions ==
The Klingon Language Institute (KLI) published a limited edition of 1000 numbered copies, in 1996, as Hamlet Prince of Denmark: The Restored Klingon Version (ISBN 0-9644345-1-2). The text is presented in parallel text format with English and Klingon on opposing pages. The translations includes notes detailing particulars of the translation.

In 2000, Pocket Books reprinted the translation as a trade paperback (ISBN 0-671-03578-9).

== See also ==
- Shakespeare and Star Trek
