= The Klingon Way =

1996 book by Marc Okrand

- Author: Marc Okrand
- Audio read by: Michael Dorn and Roxann Dawson
- Subject: Klingon language
- Genre: Phrasebook
- Publisher: Pocket Books
- Publication date: 1996
- Preceded by: The Klingon Dictionary
- Followed by: Klingon for the Galactic Traveler

The Klingon Way: A Warrior's Guide (Klingon: tlhIngan tIgh: SuvwI' DevmeH paq) is a 1996 book by the linguist Marc Okrand that was published by Pocket Books. The Klingon Way is a collection of proverbs and sayings in the constructed language of Klingon, ascribed to the Klingon race and Klingon culture in the fictional Star Trek universe. Okrand first began constructing the Klingon language in the 1980s when he was hired to produce Klingon dialogue for Star Trek III: The Search for Spock, going on to publish The Klingon Dictionary. The Klingon Way expanded the Klingon lexicon, and was followed by Klingon for the Galactic Traveler.

An audiobook version of The Klingon Way, featuring the voices of Michael Dorn and Roxann Dawson, was produced by Simon & Schuster Audio. The Klingon Language Institute considers The Klingon Way to be a canonical source of the Klingon language, and the book, along with Okrand's other work on the subject, has become highly important for a section of the Star Trek fandom.

== Background ==
Klingons were introduced as antagonists in Star Trek: The Original Series, though were portrayed as less villainous in subsequent Star Trek television programs—including Star Trek: The Next Generation, Star Trek: Deep Space Nine—and Star Trek films. The Klingon language was sometimes spoken on-screen early in the franchise's history, but became more formalised in the 1980s. Marc Okrand, a professional linguist who had previously been consulted concerning the Vulcan language for Star Trek II: The Wrath of Khan (1982), was hired to produce some dialogue in the Klingon language for Star Trek III: The Search for Spock (1984). Okrand based the language on the guttural sounds made by James Doohan that were used for the Klingon language in Star Trek: The Motion Picture (1979), as well as the requests made of him that the language have a guttural quality, that it would "sound good", and that it would have a genuine, realistic syntax, grammar and lexicon.

Okrand went on to author The Klingon Dictionary (1985). This book became significant to Star Trek fans, and a group of Klingon enthusiasts formed the Klingon Language Institute. This group began, in 1992, to publish HolQeD ("Linguistics"), a scholarly journal devoted to the study of the Klingon language. Okrand also produced two audio tapes, Conversational Klingon and Power Klingon.

The existing lexicon of Klingon was expanded with the publication of Okrand's The Klingon Way in 1996. Okrand includes a number of linguistic jokes in his books on Klingon. For example, he has described his development of the Klingon language with reference to Das Boot (1981), saying that he imagined Klingons as similar to the film's characters: "I pictured the Klingons in the same way, in tight quarters all barking at each other." Consequently, the Klingon word meaning "boot" is DaS.

== Contents ==
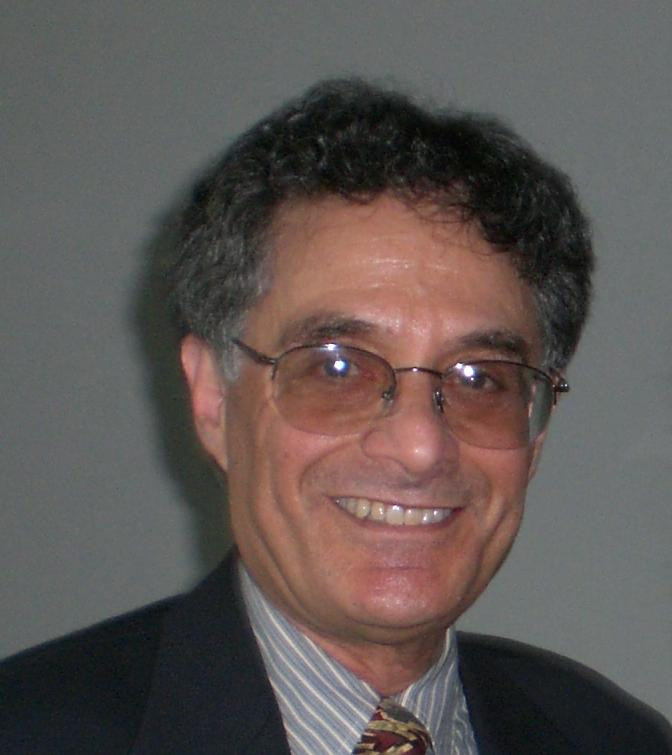
Okrand, pictured 2008

The Klingon Way contains an Introduction, Annotations, and 157 proverbs and locutions, with a number of additional proverbs or their modifications found in the descriptions. The book is not arranged in alphabetic order (neither in Klingon or English) and has no index or table of contents. The book presents English translations of the proverbs (called the Federation Standard versions) with their Klingon originals, along with explanation stories and footnote references to the Star Trek series episodes up to Star Trek: Voyager and from the films up to Star Trek VI: The Undiscovered Country. The book includes photos from Star Trek episodes and films, but does not reference the Star Trek novels.

Entry headings sometimes present more than one related proverb. The description stories explain the role of the given proverb in Klingon culture; they sometimes explain language usage of specific Klingon words or particular grammatical form, and also sometimes present additional related proverbs.

For example, the proverb Heghlu'meH QaQ jajvam ("It is a good day to die") is illustrated with a story explaining that "This is an extremely common Klingon locution, often uttered when the odds seem to favor an opponent. It does not, however, represent a defeatist attitude." Further, the book notes that "Kang, of course, spoke ironically when, accepting the proposition that there was a chance to defeat an adversary, he altered this expression to 'It is a good day to live'." The footnotes point out that this proverb was used in The Next Generation episode "Sins of the Father" and in the Deep Space Nine episode "Blood Oath". The image for this entry shows "Koloth encountering a guard for the Albino and teaching him a proverb".

Common locutions include lumbe' tlhInganpu' ("Klingons do not procrastinate"), 'utbe' bel. ("Pleasure is nonessential") and QI'tomerDaq Heghpu' Hoch ("No one survived Khitomer"). Toasts and wishes include tlhIngan maH! ("We are Klingons!"), batlh ghob yIpab ("Adhere to virtue honorably."), and batlh bIHeghjaj! ("May you die well!").

=== Audiobook ===
An audiobook version of The Klingon Way, with a running time of 75 minutes, was released by Simon & Schuster Audio. It featured the voices of Michael Dorn and Roxann Dawson, known for playing, respectively, the Klingon Worf in The Next Generation and the half-Klingon B'Elanna Torres in Voyager. The actors read the book's phrases in the Klingon language and explain the significance of them.

== Reception and significance ==
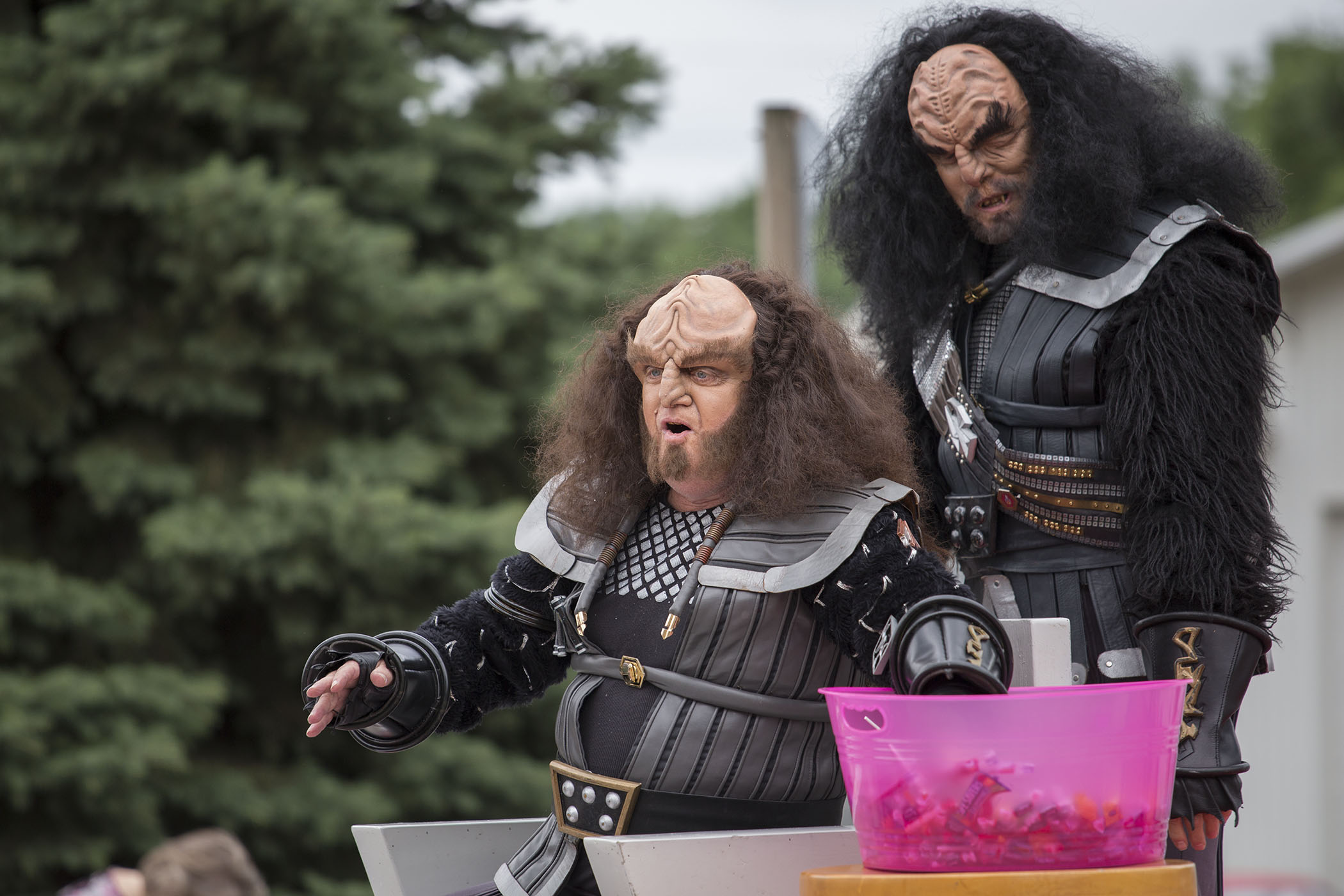
Robert O'Reilly (left) and J. G. Hertzler (right) as their Klingon characters Gowron and Martok at a 2014 Star Trek convention. Klingon culture and language has become significant for many in the Star Trek fandom.

A review of the book, concentrating on the new vocabulary and the specific grammatical features, was published by Rich "Captain Krankor" Yampell in HolQeD, and was later republished in his The Grammarian's Desk: A Collection of Grammatical Opinion & Wisdom of the Warrior's Tongue, edited by Lawrence M. Schoen. Reviewing the audiobook version of The Klingon Way for the Calgary Herald, the freelance columnist Grant McKenzie said that "If you've ever wanted to toss some conversational Klingon into a friendly chat, this audio will quickly have you up to speed and make you the hit of the next Trekker convention. Non-Trekkers, on the other hand, won't have a clue what they're listening to."

Okrand went on to produce Klingon for the Galactic Traveler (1997), a second major expansion of the Klingon language. This work presents an overview of Klingon culture as depicted in the Klingon language, containing several more Klingon proverbs and locutions, and may be considered a companion book to The Klingon Way. The Klingon Language Institute considers both to be canonical sources of the Klingon language, holding that only Okrand's work can be considered canonical. Okrand's various works have become highly significant to some Star Trek fans, who sometimes take them very seriously. The novelist and researcher Michael Hemmingson, in his 2009 study of Star Trek, explained that "The Klingon Dictionary (1992) and The Klingon Way (1995) were embraced with relish by Trekkies, resulting in a curious subculture within the fandom: people speaking the language and recreating—or engaging in simulation of hyper-reality—Klingon culture and rituals, as represented in the movies and The Next Generation, into their everyday lives".

== See also ==
- List of Star Trek reference books
- Outline of Star Trek
