= The Klingon Dictionary =

1985 book by Marc Okrand

- Second edition cover
- Author: Marc Okrand
- Language: English/Klingon
- Subject: Science Fiction / Linguistics
- Genre: Non-fiction
- Publisher: Pocket Books
- Publication date: 1985, extended 1992
- Publication place: United States
- Media type: Print (Paperback)
- Pages: 191 pp.
- ISBN: 0-671-74559-X
- Followed by: The Klingon Way

The Klingon Dictionary (TKD) is a book by Marc Okrand describing the Klingon language. First published in 1985 and then again with an addendum in 1992, it includes pronunciation, grammar and vocabulary. It has sold more than three hundred thousand copies and has been translated into five languages.

The book is a description of the grammar with a few examples for every rule. It is not suitable for active learning and practice of the language, because it does not contain any exercises. It has never been intended as a learning book. Its source was intended as a guide for scriptwriters and actors. It was only later sold for merchandising for Star Trek fans.

== Summary ==
The dictionary is written from an in-universe perspective. After a brief introduction about the Klingon culture and also how the book has been written, the pronunciation of the Klingon letters is described. Instead of using phonetic symbols, the letters of the Latin alphabet are used, some of them written in upper case to distinguish special pronunciations. For instance, q and Q represent different voiceless uvular consonants, the voiceless uvular affricate and the voiceless uvular plosive, respectively. The largest part of the book is a description of the grammar, including briefly described rules sorted by type of words, accompanied by a few examples for each grammatical topic. The last part of the book contains a list of vocabulary with roughly 1,500 words, followed by a list of useful phrases. The addendum of 1992 contains some new grammatical details and a list of about 200 new words that appeared in or were created for later movies and in the television series Star Trek: The Next Generation.

== Digital editions ==
Since 2008, the book is available for E-book readers.

In 2009, publisher Simon & Schuster introduced an iPhone application version of The Klingon Dictionary as part of three applications rolled into a Klingon Language Suite. The new digital format features a precise pronunciation guide, rules for proper use of affixes and suffixes, and a search menu.

== Translations ==
The dictionary was first translated into Portuguese and published in Brazil in 1995. Its title was simply Dicionário da língua klingon.

The following translation was German in 1996 bearing the title Das offizielle Wörterbuch Klingonisch/Deutsch ("The Official Klingon-German Dictionary"). That book contains many typos and incorrect translations, which can be misleading when learning the language. A revised version, corrected by Klingon teacher Lieven Litaer, was released in 2013.

The Italian translation was published in 1998 by the Roman publisher Fanucci Editore and named Il dizionario Klingon-Italiano ("The Klingon-Italian Dictionary").

In 2008, the dictionary was translated into Czech with the title Klingonský slovník (Klingon Dictionary).

An Arabic translation was published in 2024. This version is the first one to include Klingon letters to display Klingon words.

In 2025, a Japanese translation was published. It includes a QR code leading to an online list of new Klingon words that have appeared after the publication of the original book.

== In popular culture ==
- In the season 2 episode "The Panty Piñata Polarization" of The Big Bang Theory, the dictionary is used during a game of Klingon Boggle.

== Follow up ==
New vocabulary and grammar rules, published after 1992, can be found in two audio-courses and two more books by Marc Okrand, and in the scholarly journal HolQeD published by the Klingon Language Institute (1992-2004):

- Conversational Klingon (1992) - audiocourse
- Power Klingon (1993) - audiocourse
- The Klingon Way (1996)
- Klingon for the Galactic Traveler (1997).

== See also ==
- Klingon grammar
- Klingons
- The Klingon Way
- List of Star Trek reference books
- Alien language
