= Klingon =

Fictional species in Star Trek

Klingons
- Star Trek race
- The Klingon insignia, designed by Matt Jefferies
- Created by: Gene L. Coon

In-universe information
- Quadrant: Beta
- Home world: Qo'noS (Kronos), Faal Alpha (as of season 1 episode 4 of Star Trek: Starfleet Academy, Vox in Excelso)

The Klingons (/ˈklɪŋ.(ɡ)ɒn/ KLING-(g)on; Klingon: tlhIngan [ˈt͡ɬɪŋɑn]) are a humanoid species of aliens in the science fiction franchise Star Trek.

Developed by screenwriter Gene L. Coon in 1967 for the original Star Trek (TOS) series, Klingons were humanoids characterized by prideful ruthlessness and brutality. Hailing from their homeworld Qo'noS (in the Klingon language pronounced /ˈq͡χoʔnoʂ/, but usually rendered as /ˈkronos/ in English), Klingons practiced feudalism and authoritarianism, with a warrior caste relying on slave labor and reminiscent of Ancient Sparta. With a greatly expanded budget for makeup and effects, the Klingons were completely redesigned for Star Trek: The Motion Picture (1979), acquiring ridged foreheads. In subsequent television series and in later films, the militaristic traits of the Klingons were bolstered by an increased sense of honor and a strict warrior code similar to those of bushido, and a view of the afterlife similar to that of the Ancient Scandinavians.

Klingons are recurring antagonists in the 1960s television series Star Trek, and have appeared in all subsequent series, along with ten of the Star Trek feature films. Initially intended to be antagonists for the crew of the USS Enterprise, the Klingons became a close ally of humanity in Star Trek: The Next Generation. In the 1990s series Star Trek: Deep Space Nine, humans and Klingons join with the Romulans to fight the Dominion.

Among the elements created for the revised Klingons was a complete Klingon language, developed by Marc Okrand from gibberish suggested by actor James Doohan. Spoken Klingon has entered popular culture, even to the extent that some of the works of William Shakespeare and parts of the Bible have been translated into it. A dictionary, a book of sayings, and a cultural guide to the language have been published. According to the Guinness World Records, Klingon is the world's most popular fictional language as measured by number of speakers.

== Design ==
=== Conception ===
Two Klingon men and a Klingon woman as they appear in the Star Trek: The Original Series episode "Day of the Dove". The bronzed skin, facial hair, lack of ridged foreheads, and simple costumes are typical of The Original Series.

The Klingons were created by screenwriter Gene L. Coon, and first appeared in the Star Trek episode "Errand of Mercy" (1967). They were named after Lieutenant Wilbur Clingan, who served with Star Trek creator Gene Roddenberry in the Los Angeles Police Department. In the original television series (TOS), Klingons were typically portrayed with bronze skin and facial hair suggestive of Asian people and possessed physical abilities similar to humans (in fact, Coon's only physical description of them in his "Errand of Mercy" script is "oriental" and "hard-faced"). The swarthy look of Klingon males was created with the application of shoe polish and long, thin moustaches; budget constraints limited creativity. The overall look of the aliens, played by white actors, suggested orientalism, at a time when memories of Japanese actions during World War II were still fresh. The production crew never came to an agreement on the name "Klingon"; Coon was adamant about keeping the name, and it persisted because no one else offered up a better name.

The Klingons took on the role of the Soviet Union with the fictional government the United Federation of Planets playing the role of the United States. As a result, the Klingons were generally portrayed as inferior to the crew of the Enterprise. While occasionally capable of honor and even humour, overall, they were shown without redeeming qualities—brutish, scheming, and murderous. Klingons became the primary antagonists of the Enterprise crew, in part because the makeup necessary to make another alien race, the Romulans, was too time-consuming and costly.

For the first two seasons, no Klingon ships were seen despite being frequently mentioned. This was because of budget constraints; designer Matt Jefferies did not have the money to create a Klingon ship until the third season. When the episodes were remastered beginning in 2006, Klingon ships were digitally inserted into shots earlier than their original appearances.

=== Redesign ===
For Star Trek: The Motion Picture (1979), the Klingons' appearance was radically changed. To give the aliens a more sophisticated and threatening demeanor, the Klingons were depicted with ridged foreheads, snaggled and prominent teeth, and a defined language and alphabet. Lee Cole, a production designer, used red gels and primitive shapes in the design of Klingon consoles and ship interiors, which took on a dark and moody atmosphere. The alphabet was designed as angular, with sharp edges alluding to the Klingons' militaristic focus. Costume designer Robert Fletcher created new uniforms for the Klingons, reminiscent of feudal Japanese armor.

Certain elements of Klingon culture, resembling Japanese culture with honor at the forefront, were actually first explored with the script for the planned two-part "Kitumba" episode for the unproduced 1978 Star Trek: Phase II series. Writer John Meredyth Lucas said, "I wanted something that we had never seen before on the series, and that's a penetration deep into enemy space. I started to think of how the Klingons lived. Obviously for the Romulans we had Romans, and we've had different cultures modeled on those of ancient Earth, but I tried to think of what the Klingon society would be like. The Japanese came to mind, so basically that's what it was, with the Sacred Emperor, the Warlord and so on."

While no Klingon characters were seen in Star Trek II: The Wrath of Khan, their appearance as the central enemy in Star Trek III: The Search for Spock (1984) led to minor alterations. For the third generation of Klingons, the heavy, cragged head ridges of The Motion Picture were redesigned and made less pronounced. While Fletcher was happy with the original film uniforms, more had to be created as the old costumes had been lost, destroyed, or loaned out and altered irreparably. New costumes were fabricated, retaining the air of feudal Japanese design; Fletcher thought it was an important part of the Klingon authoritarian attitude. New Klingon weaponry was designed, including an energy weapon and a special knife known as a d'k tahg. In Star Trek VI: The Undiscovered Country, it was revealed Klingons had pink blood.

Michael Dorn and Robert O'Reilly as Worf and Gowron in an episode of Star Trek: The Next Generation, sporting Fletcher's costumes. Worf holds a knife known as a d'k tahg.

The release of a new television series, Star Trek: The Next Generation, prompted a further revision in the depiction of Klingon culture, though Gene Roddenberry had wanted to avoid re-appearances of races from the old series. Set a century later than the original series, the USS Enterprise-D featured a Klingon crewmember, Worf. Makeup artist Michael Westmore needed a consistent reference to base the Klingon look on, as each individual Klingon was to have distinct head ridges. He found what he was looking for in a book of dinosaurs: observing dinosaur vertebrae laid out flat, Westmore cut the designs in half and modified them to suit each Klingon. Westmore designed his Klingons' beards to be Elizabethan, combining prehistoric and aristocratic elements to give audiences a feeling of depth from the appearance. Over time, Westmore and the other makeup artists designed different sizes of prosthetic headpieces which could be quickly applied and modified to save time; the amount of preparation to turn an actor into a Klingon decreased from around three hours to one. While important characters had custom headpieces, background actors used pre-made masks with minor touchup around the eyes and mouth. The Next Generation effects artist Dan Curry used his martial arts experience to create a flowing fighting style for the race. When the episode "Reunion" called for a special Klingon blade, Curry drew on Far East influences to develop a weapon known as the bat'leth. Curry, a collector of weapons, was annoyed by fictional weaponry that was designed to "look cool" but could not be handled practically. Curry combined elements of the Himalayan kukri, Chinese axes and fighting crescents to create a two-handed, curved weapon that has since been widely used in the franchise.

The culture of the Klingons began to resemble revised western stereotypes of civilizations such as the Zulu, the Spartans, the Vikings, and various Native American nations—as a proud, warlike and principled race. Whereas the TOS Klingons served as an allegory to contemporary totalitarian regimes, The Next Generation Klingons held principles more in line with Bushidō; actor Michael Dorn stated that without the revision in Klingon culture, his character, Worf, would not have been a Starfleet officer. With the first Klingon-centric story in The Next Generation, the first-season episode "Heart of Glory", the Klingons once again became an important part of the Star Trek universe, and by the advent of the series Star Trek: Deep Space Nine, Klingons had become heroes rather than villains, though often at cross purposes to the Federation.

The final Star Trek film to feature the entire cast from the original television series, Star Trek VI: The Undiscovered Country (1991), served to bridge the original series' Klingons at war with the Federation to the time of The Next Generation and presents a subtly different treatment of the race. At the time of the film's development, the Soviet Union was collapsing, and with the advent of glasnost, the old allegory of Klingons as Russians was becoming obsolete. The Klingons were redesigned to evoke the Nazis, with the red, white and black Klingon flag deliberately similar to that of the Nazi Party. The Klingons in the film liberally quote Shakespeare, a trait stemming from director Nicholas Meyer's comparison of the Empire's appropriation of Shakespeare to the Nazis' similar attempt in the 1930s. Meyer also felt it was appropriate for Shakespearean actors such as Christopher Plummer and David Warner to speak the lines. The breakdown of the Klingons' empire because of a Chernobyl-like incident results in a new age for the Federation and Klingons, leading to the time of The Next Generation and later series where the two governments are trade partners and occasional allies. Starfleet members are shown to be highly bigoted against Klingons, who in turn feel that their way of life will be obliterated by peace. The Klingons were given new uniforms designed by Dodie Shepard, in part because there were not enough of Fletcher's The Motion Picture costumes to meet the demands of the film.

Dorn described playing a Klingon as simple, joking that after hours sitting in a makeup chair, actors were highly motivated to get the dialogue right the first time. Repeat Klingon Robert O'Reilly told all neophyte Klingons that the most important part of speaking was to say the lines with belief and "go all the way". When O'Reilly and Dorn's character had a confrontation, makeup artists wiped spittle off each between takes, a consequence of the harsh-sounding language. Todd Bryant (Captain Klaa in Star Trek V: The Final Frontier) similarly noted that if an actor was projectile-spitting on others as he spoke Klingon, he was doing a great job.

When filming The Undiscovered Country, Christopher Plummer asked director Nicholas Meyer to adapt his character's look, feeling the heavy forehead appliances looked rather fake. Instead, Plummer's character, General Chang, was made bald with subdued ridges and an eyepatch bolted to his skull. Plummer felt that the unique appearance helped "humanize" the character. In contrast to white actors portraying the warriors, more recent Klingon roles have been predominantly played by black actors.

For Star Trek: Discovery, the Klingon appearance was once again modified with more extensive facial and teeth prosthetics and elongated craniums. The new Klingons were initially bald, in contrast with the previous depictions, but this was retconned in season 2. The lack of hair was said to have been ceremonial during the time of war with the Federation, harking back to the tale of Kahless having cut off a lock of hair to forge the first bat'leth. They also have black and purple skin color variations.

=== Change in appearance after TOS ===
According to the official Star Trek web site, the Klingons' varying appearance was "probably the single most popular topic of conversation among Star Trek fans". While the reason for the discrepancy between The Original Series Klingons and their feature film and later television series counterparts was a lack of budget, fans took it upon themselves to contrive an acceptable canon reason for the sudden change.

Among the fan theories, were that TOS Klingons were:

- They gradually genetically engineered their bodies to be tougher and more robust, to be better suited for head butting and for the rigors of a warfare loving existence.
- Humans raised as Klingons, similar to the Janissary of the Ottoman Empire.
- Stripped of ridges via surgery for cosmetic or diplomatic reasons
- Hybrids with a more human species,
- Some subjugated race conscripted or deployed near the Federation border.

Simple theories that the different Klingons were different racial breeds were complicated by the fact that the characters of Kang, Koloth, and Kor appeared with smooth features in The Original Series yet had a ridged appearance in Star Trek: Deep Space Nine and that Worf acknowledged the difference in appearances when the crew of Deep Space 9 returned to the 23rd century in the episode "Trials and Tribble-ations" but offered no explanation, saying merely, "We do not discuss it with outsiders."

A canonical explanation for the change was given in a two-part storyline on Star Trek: Enterprise, in the episodes "Affliction" and "Divergence" that aired in February 2005. Attempting to replicate experiments by humans to create augmented soldiers, Klingon scientists used genetic material from human test subjects on their own people, which resulted in a viral pandemic which caused Klingons to develop human-like physical characteristics. Dr. Phlox of the Enterprise formulated a cure for the virus, but the physical alterations remained in the populace and were inherited by offspring. Phlox indicated that "some day" the physical alterations could be reversed. The head scientist finally mentioned he would go into cranial reconstructive surgery, another nod to "restoration" of the ridges for some Klingons.

In the non-canon Star Trek: The Role Playing Game (FASA, 1982), the smooth-headed Klingons seen in The Original Series were called "fusions", in particular, "human fusions", with "Romulan fusions" also existing. They were a deliberate blending of Klingon genes with those of other races in an effort to gain an understanding of, and thus advantage over, the other races. Human fusions were chosen for service on the Federation border due to the high number of humans present in the Federation. Fusions of both types were considered inferior to pure strain "Imperial Klingons" and were segregated.

In the non-canon video game Star Trek Online, Klingons under the command of Ambassador B'vat once again attempt to fuse the DNA of other races with their own. In a chapter called "The Ultimate Klingon", the player character travels to the planet H'atoria in the Korvat System to infiltrate a secret Klingon research facility and discovers Amar Singh, a descendant of Khan Noonien Singh, has merged Klingon, Augment, and Gorn DNA to create a ferocious, mindless monstrosity the player must destroy. Singh is arrested and imprisoned at Facility 4028.

== Attributes ==
=== Biology ===
Klingons possess a robust and enduring biology as well as large and muscular statures. Klingons have been seen on multiple occasions possessing physical strength equal to or superior to that of Jem'Hadar and Hirogen, two other races possessing immense strength, and the half-human B'Elanna Torres proves more than a match for a Vulcan. Their anatomy is redundant and supernumerary; every organ has a backup, including an extra set of kidneys, an eight-chambered heart, a third lung, a secondary brain stem, as well as an extensive and hardy skeletal structure. This redundancy is evident even at the cellular level; for example, the Klingons have backup synaptic networks in their nervous systems, allowing them to grow a new spine, as was demonstrated with Worf when his spine was surgically removed and replaced with a transplanted, genetically cloned new one. Their rapid metabolism allows injured Klingons to heal quickly. All of this makes Klingons extremely hardy and difficult to kill, as necessitated by their aggressive nature, and resistant to physical trauma, environmental exposure, and illness. Klingons alone have a natural resistance to "the Phage," which plagues the Vidiians of the Delta Quadrant. Like Cardassians, they avoid cold temperatures. Klingons also have a heightened sense of smell as suggested in "Birthright, Part II" in The Next Generation, when Worf and a Klingon boy go hunting and can track an animal by scent.

Klingon children are fierce and aggressive by nature; from as soon as they can walk, they are instructed into honing their hunting and combat skills, strengthening their physical prowess and agility. Like humans, they go through a form of puberty, which, as Picard puts it in Star Trek: Insurrection "hardly does it justice" and includes sudden bursts of hair growth, extreme mood swings, violent tendencies, and the Klingon equivalent of acne (called 'Gorch' in Klingon).

=== Culture ===
In comparison to The Original Series, Klingon culture is thoroughly examined in later series' episodes, part of a larger movement by Star Trek writers to deepen viewer understanding of the alien races of the franchise. The Klingons adhere to a strict code of honor, similar to feudal Mongolian or Japanese customs; however, some, such as Gowron, appear to struggle to live up to their ideals. Their society is based on war and combat; ritual suicide is often preferred over living life as a crippled warrior, and may allow a warrior to die with honor. To be captured rather than killed in battle brings dishonor to not only the captive but his descendants. Death is depicted as a time for celebration, not grief.

Klingons are depicted as a spiritual people. According to their legends, Klingons slew their own gods. The equivalents to heaven and hell are called Sto-Vo-Kor and Gre'Thor, respectively; in Sto-Vo-Kor, battle and feasting can be eternally won and shared, while those sent to Gre'Thor are condemned to eternal torture unless their honor is restored by living relatives. Those who do not die in battle may not enter Sto-Vo-Kor; relatives undertake quests to guarantee their deceased comrades' entry into paradise. Despite believing in an afterlife, the Klingons perform a form of last rite. This consists of spreading the eyes open, humming in anticipation of the final breath and roaring skywards when the warrior dies, warning the dead a Klingon warrior is coming (as shown in "Heart of Glory"). Yet Klingons have no burial rites, and dispose of corpses by the most expedient means available, considering them "empty shells".

The Klingons' spiritual leader is Kahless, a messianic historical figure who established early codes of honor and was the first Klingon emperor. His fabled weapon, the Sword of Kahless, is depicted as a unique bat'leth that serves as the Klingon equivalent of the Holy Grail. In the TNG episode "Rightful Heir", Kahless appears in the flesh to Worf, who had doubted his Klingon faith. This Kahless is revealed to be a clone, created in an attempt to bring Klingons together, and who is chosen to lead the Klingon people as a figurehead.

=== Language ===
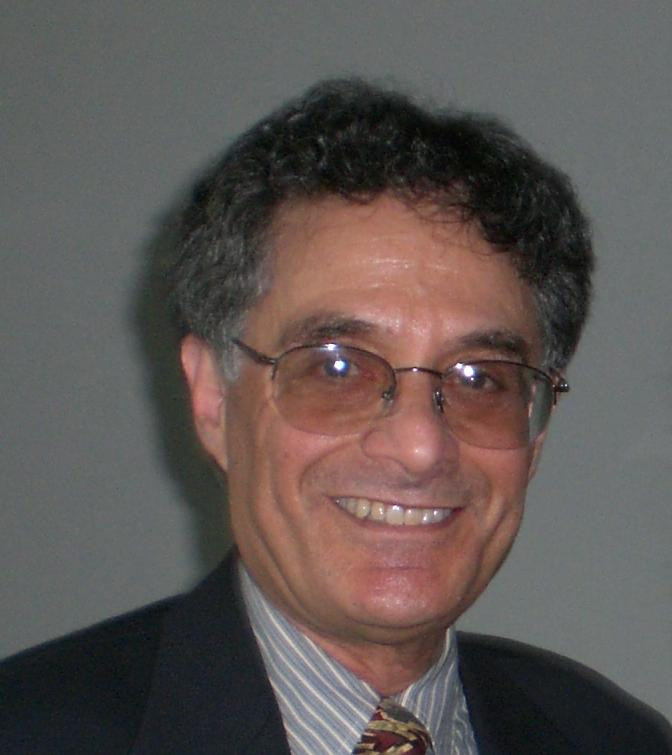
Marc Okrand is the author of several books about the Klingon language, which he developed.

The Klingons have their own language that was developed for the feature films, often described as "guttural". For The Motion Picture, James Doohan, the actor who portrayed Montgomery Scott, devised the initial Klingon-language dialogue heard in the film. For The Search for Spock, Marc Okrand, who created the Vulcan dialogue used in the previous film, developed an actual working Klingon language based on Doohan's original made-up words.

Okrand was presented with a difficult task of contriving a language that sounded alien, while still simple enough for the actors to pronounce. While most constructed languages follow basic tenets of natural languages — for example, all languages have an "ah" sound — Okrand deliberately broke them. He chose the rarest form of sentence construction, the object-verb-subject form: the translation of the phrase "I boarded the Enterprise", would be constructed as "The Enterprise boarded I." Okrand reasoned the language would be indicative of the culture — the Klingons' language focuses on actions and verbs, like Mongolian. Adjectives do not strictly exist; there is no word for 'greedy', but there is a verb, qur, which means 'to be greedy'. The language does not contain the verb 'to be', which meant Okrand had to create a workaround when director Nicholas Meyer wanted his Klingons to quote Shakespeare and the famous line "to be, or not to be" in The Undiscovered Country. Initially, Okrand came up with "to live or not live", but Plummer did not like the sound of the line. Okrand went back and revised the phrase to taH pagh, taHbe', roughly meaning 'whether to continue, or not to continue [existence]'. The Klingon language has a small vocabulary compared to natural languages, containing around 2,000 words after it had been created in the 1990s. After its initial creation, Okrand has frequently created new words, so that the total number of words has grown up to approximately 3,000.

Okrand persuaded Pocket Books to publish The Klingon Dictionary in 1985; in it, Okrand elaborated on the Klingon language's grammar, syntax, and vocabulary. While Okrand expected the book to only sell as a novelty item, 11 years after publication it had sold 250,000 copies. Dedicated Klingon enthusiasts, some but not all of whom were Star Trek fans, created the Klingon Language Institute, which published multiple magazines in the language. While Paramount initially tried to stop the Institute from using its copyrighted language, the company eventually relented. The Institute has since published Klingon translations of Hamlet, Much Ado About Nothing, Tao Te Ching, Gilgamesh, and has translations of some books from the Bible on its website. The Bible proved to be difficult to translate, as Christian concepts like atonement—and words like God (until the recent addition of Qun meaning 'god')—are not found in the Klingon vernacular. From time to time, Okrand has amended the "official" list of Klingon vocabulary due in part to requests from the Institute and other groups. Other Klingon groups run blood drives, bowling teams, and a golf championship.

The Klingon language's prevalence is not limited to books; a three-disc video game, Star Trek: Klingon, requires players to learn the language to advance. In May 2009, a joint collaboration between the Klingon Language Institute, Simon & Schuster, and Ultralingua launched the Klingon Language Suite for the iPhone concurrent with the release of the new movie. The popularity of the language meant that in 1996 it was considered the fastest-growing constructed language, ahead of other languages such as Tolkien's Elvish or Esperanto. In 2018, the language learning app Duolingo added a Klingon language course, which is, as of June 2022, in Beta. While the language is widespread, mastery of the language is extremely uncommon. Okrand himself is not fluent, and the actors who speak the language in the Star Trek series are more concerned with its expression than the actual grammar. According to the 2006 edition of Guinness World Records, Klingon is the most spoken fictional language by number of speakers, Klingon is one of many language interfaces in the Google search engine, and a Klingon character was included in the Wikipedia logo before its May 2010 update, when it was replaced by a Geʿez character.

=== Starships ===
As the Klingons are portrayed as a warrior culture, Klingon starships are usually depicted as warships, heavily armed with a variety of particle beam weaponry and antimatter warheads. Many Klingon ships also make use of cloaking technology to hide the vessel from view. The first Klingon ship design used in The Original Series, the D7-class battlecruiser, was designed by Matt Jefferies to evoke a predator's shape akin to that of a manta ray, providing a threatening and instantly recognizable form for viewers. The configuration of Jefferies' design featured a bulbous forward hull connected by a long boom to a wing-like main hull with the engine nacelles mounted on each wingtip. Later Klingon starships by other designers kept to this same overall configuration, although updated to reflect their respective time periods: Rick Sternbach's designs for The Next Generation and Deep Space Nine drew on elements of Starfleet ships features to reflect the alliance between the Federation and the Klingons, while John Eaves' designs for Enterprise incorporated more rugged and primitive construction to make the vessels appear consistent with the earlier time period.

=== Homeworld ===
Flag of the Klingon Empire

The Klingon homeworld has been given several names; according to Marc Okrand, the planet would have been referred to in several ways, just as Earth is referred to variously as "the world" or "Terra". Early Star Trek literature referred to the planet as Klinzhai, but The Next Generation episode "Heart of Glory" called the planet Kling. The film Star Trek VI: The Undiscovered Country established the name as Kronos; Okrand later devised the Klingon transliteration Qo'noS.

In Star Trek Into Darkness, the planet's name is both spelled and spoken by Starfleet personnel as Kronos.

According to the non-canon Klingon for the Galactic Traveler, Qo'noS (said to be in the Omega Leonis star system) is depicted as green when viewed from space. It includes a lone, huge land mass with a vast ocean, a severely tilted axis that causes wild seasonal changes, a turbulent atmosphere and extremes of both warm and frigid weather. The planet is also home to the Capital City of the Klingon Empire, which features prominently in several episodes of The Next Generation and Deep Space Nine. In Star Trek Into Darkness, one province of Qo'noS is depicted as an unpopulated and abandoned post-industrial sprawl. A moon, Praxis, about 1/4 of the diameter of Qo'noS is seen in orbit. Its destruction was a plot point in the film The Undiscovered Country, the after-effects driving the plot of the film and later events in the television series Star Trek: The Next Generation.

In Star Trek: Starfleet Academy, Qo'noS is revealed to have been destroyed in the Burn along with several other worlds, leaving the Klingons an endangered species. In "Vox in Excelso", the Klingons settle on a new homeworld in Federation space, Faan Alpha, which is stated to have virtually identical conditions to Qo'noS.

== See also ==
- Klingon High Council
- Klingon language
- Klingon grammar
- The Klingon Way
