= Omega Leonis =

Spectroscopic binary star system in the constellation Leo

ω Leonis
- Location of ω Leonis (circled in red)

Observation data Epoch J2000.0 Equinox ICRS
- Constellation: Leo
- Right ascension: 09^{h} 28^{m} 27.39861^{s}
- Declination: +09° 03′ 24.4255″
- Apparent magnitude (V): 5.42 (5.69 + 7.28)

Characteristics

ω Leo A
- Evolutionary stage: main sequence
- Spectral type: G1 V
- U−B color index: +0.12
- B−V color index: +0.60

Astrometry
Radial velocity (R_{v})	−7.6±0.2 km/s
Proper motion (μ)	RA: +36.98 mas/yr Dec.: +5.78 mas/yr
Parallax (π)	30.15±1.45 mas
Distance	108 ± 5 ly (33 ± 2 pc)
Absolute magnitude (M_{V})	+2.72

Orbit
Period (P)	42,678.5 days
Eccentricity (e)	0.56
Periastron epoch (T)	2436769.0 (JD)
Argument of periastron (ω) (secondary)	124.6°
Semi-amplitude (K_{1}) (primary)	2.2 km/s

Details

ω Leo A
Mass	1.35+0.05 −0.03 M_{☉}
Luminosity	6 L_{☉}
Surface gravity (log g)	3.82±0.05 cgs
Temperature	5940±85 K
Metallicity [Fe/H]	0.02±0.06 dex
Rotational velocity (v sin i)	5.1 km/s
Age	3.68+0.31 −0.28 Gyr

Other designations
- ω Leo, 2 Leo, BD+09°2188, HD 81858, HIP 46454, HR 3754, SAO 117717

Database references
SIMBAD	data

ω Leonis (Latinised as Omega Leonis, abbreviated to ω Leo or Omega Leo), is a star system located in the zodiac constellation of Leo. It is visible to the naked eye in the absence of light pollution, with an apparent visual magnitude of about 5.4. The distance to this star, as determined using parallax measurements, is around 108 light years from the Sun. Because of its location close to the ecliptic, it is subject to being obscured by the Moon, and potentially by planets.

This is a spectroscopic binary star system with an orbital period of 116.8 years and an eccentricity of 0.56. In 2010, speckle interferometry observations showed an angular separation of 738±10 mas between the two components along a position angle of 102.7°±0.6°. The primary is a G-type main sequence star with a spectral classification of G1 V. It has about 35% more mass than the Sun and shines six times as brightly from an outer atmosphere that has an effective temperature of 5940 K. The system is roughly 3.7 billion years old and is a member of the galactic thin disk population.
