= Klingon for the Galactic Traveler =

1997 book written by Marc Okrand

- Author: Marc Okrand
- Language: English/Klingon
- Subject: Science Fiction / Linguistics
- Genre: Non-fiction
- Publisher: Pocket Books
- Publication date: 1997
- Publication place: United States
- Media type: Print (Paperback)
- Pages: 272 pp.
- ISBN: 0-671-00995-8
- Preceded by: The Klingon Way

Klingon for the Galactic Traveler (KGT) is the third book written by Marc Okrand about the Klingon language. It was published in 1997.

The book represents the second major expansion of the Klingon language.

== Contents ==
The book provides information on Klingon sociolinguistics including: regional vocabulary, variation between the speech of younger and older generations, idioms, slang, dialects, and specialized vocabulary relating to food, warfare, the visual arts and music. It contains an addendum to the wordlist appearing in The Klingon Dictionary with expanded definitions and new words. This list includes the new vocabulary items that were first published in The Klingon Way.

Since the publication of The Klingon Dictionary, many new words pertaining to Klingon culture appeared in Star Trek: The Next Generation and Star Trek: Deep Space Nine. Frequently, the Klingon appearing in the shows was inconsistent with the vocabulary, grammar, and pronunciation set out in The Klingon Dictionary (see the Klingon language in Star Trek canon). These discrepancies are explained in Klingon for the Galactic Traveler as being the result of special constructions, archaic forms, or ritual language.

The book explains some points of grammar, like the use of the -neS suffix and apparent inconsistencies in Okrand's earlier work (like non-use of the verb prefix lu- and special variant word order used in toasts).

The book was reviewed in HolQeD, the journal of the Klingon Language Institute.
