= Klingon Language Institute =

Organisation trying to promote the Klingon language

- Klingon Language Institute, Inc
- tlhIngan Hol yejHaD
- Logo of the Klingon Language Institute
- Abbreviation: KLI
- Formation: 1992
- Founder: Lawrence M. Schoen
- Type: Non-profit, volunteer-based
- Purpose: Klingon language preservation, research, educational outreach and promotion
- Headquarters: Northern Kentucky
- Board President: Chris Lipscombe
- Board Vice-President: Jeremy Cowan
- Board of directors: Chris Lipscombe, Jeremy Cowan, Alan Anderson, Christopher Kidder-Mostrom
- Website: https://kli.org

The Klingon Language Institute (KLI) is an independent organization originally founded in Flourtown, Pennsylvania and now located in Kentucky. Its goal is to promote the Klingon language, a constructed language from the Star Trek fictional universe, as well as Klingon culture.

== General ==
The KLI has members from all over the world. For 13 years, it published a quarterly journal HolQeD (Klingon for "linguistics"), before discontinuing the paper mailings and changing to an electronic version which quickly stopped entirely. It also published the fiction and poetry magazine jatmey for three volumes. It now publishes a number of translated works, including The Wizard of Oz, the Tao Te Ching, the Epic of Gilgamesh, Much Ado About Nothing and others. Each year, the KLI hosts a five-day conference called the qepʼaʼ (Klingon for "great meeting"), which is open to both members and anyone interested in the language. The KLI is running several projects, including the administration of the Duolingo Klingon language course, translation into Klingon of a number of award-winning science fiction short stories, books of the Bible, and works by Shakespeare. The motto of the institute is "qoʼmey poSmoH Hol", which means "Language opens worlds".

The KLI is a 501(c)3 nonprofit corporation and exists to facilitate the scholarly exploration of the Klingon language and culture. It has the permission of CBS Studios to use trademarks such as "Star Trek" and "Klingon".

== History ==
The KLI was founded in 1992 in Flourtown, Pennsylvania by psychology researcher and linguistics writer Lawrence M. Schoen, with the intention of launching and operating a more in-depth organization from which he and others could work in "an ongoing career of lectures at conventions and museums across three continents, and [aid in] the development of a loose affiliation of language scholars and amateurs throughout fifty countries" which were dedicated to "the world's most popular fictional language".

Each year, in midsummer, an annual meeting called the qep'a' takes place. It is open to anyone who is interested in the Klingon language, and usually takes place in the United States. The eighth meeting, the first and only ever outside the US, was held in Brussels, Belgium in 2001 and was organized by Lieven Litaer. At these meetings, attendees discuss and use the Klingon language in both formal lessons and panels, as well as informal activities and events. It is held at a more professional level compared to a standard science fiction convention. At the qep'a' conference held in 2003, the development of a documentary movie about the KLI, Earthlings: Ugly Bags of Mostly Water, was unveiled. This movie was presented at the Cannes Film Festival in France, and provided with a limited theatrical release.

In 2022, the Klingon Language Institute relocated its primary operating headquarters from Pennsylvania to Kentucky. During the KLI qep'a' wejmaHDIch conference held in 2023, Schoen announced his retirement from the KLI, and was awarded a plaque for his years of service to the organization.

== Organization ==
The KLI board of directors was formed in 1992 and is currently made up of Chris Lipscombe, board president and IT coordinator, Jeremy Cowan, vice president and qep'a' coordinator, and Alan Anderson, treasurer and primary grammarian.

Among the programs the KLI administers is the Klingon Language Certification Program, which is designed to recognize KLI members for their achievements in learning Klingon. The program defines four levels of certification, from Beginner ("taghwI'") to Grammarian ("pab pIn"). Certification is awarded based upon performance on written tests, administered by representatives of the KLI. Testing is available for free to all active KLI members. Currently, only the first three levels have a test, and no one has been awarded the pab pIn level as of 2023. Beginners' Grammarians from the email list are not considered pab pIn.

During the 1990s and 2000s, at intervals ranging from three to eighteen months, a Beginners Grammarian was elected from among the most experienced intermediate level speakers on the tlhIngan Hol mailing list operated by the KLI. Their duty was to help teach the beginners of the Klingon language who used the email discussion list. The process was designed to help new students of the language while also helping improve the knowledge and skills of the Beginners' Grammarian. When their duty was over, they kept their title of Beginners' Grammarian. The KLI has over twenty former Beginners' Grammarians.

Some Klingonists have gained relative fame for various accomplishments. The KLI has awarded the title "Friend of Maltz" to Klingonists who has furthered the language in various significant ways. This award has only been given out to twelve people since the formation of the KLI. Its recipients are Alan Anderson, William Martin, Mark Shoulson, Rich Yampell, D'Armond Speers, Nick Nicholas, Robyn Stewart, Eric Andeen, Jeremy Cowan, Chris Lipscombe and Lieven L. Litaer.

Over the years the KLI has assisted in the translation of hundreds of licensed Star Trek products. Having some of the most experienced Klingon speakers, the KLI is often contacted for or involved in translations before they are published. This work may include reviews or even complete translation work. Collaborative publications, releases and products include the 2011 Star Trek Klingon Collector's Edition of the board game Monopoly, comics, manuals, the miniature Star Trek: How to Speak Klingon (2013) phrase book (including audio samples provided by Schoen), and the rock song Star Trek Online: Steel and Flame (2021). Additionally, the Klingon Language Institute provided assistance in reviewing paq'batlh (2011), the companion book for the Klingon opera ʼuʼ.

The institute is in close contact with Marc Okrand, the creator of the Klingon language, who has visited each qepʼaʼ since the third one. At those meetings, he receives a wishlist of requests for unaccounted terms within Klingon vocabulary, which he frequently addresses and answers. The first significant batch of these new words were first published in HolQeD, and they were also made available for free on the KLI's website, although these compilations are now published directly to the website following inquiries and events.

== Publications and translations ==
- HolQeD, a quarterly journal of the KLI containing grammatical discussions, new Klingon words, Klingon literature as well as internal information for the members; it ceased publication in 2003.
- A Pictorial Guide to the Verbal Suffixes of tlhIngan Hol (1995) by Lawrence M. Schoen, an illustrative book with drawings, infographics and linguistic examinations which explains the role and/or purpose of different Klingon suffixes.
- From the Grammarian's Desk (1996), a collection of grammatical wisdom from the HolQeD column by Rich Yampell, credited as "Captain Krankor" or HoD Qanqor.
- cha' monmey (2021) by Jackson Bradley, the world's first novel to be originally written in and published in Klingon.
- ghIlghameS, a Klingon translation of the Epic of Gilgamesh.
- The Klingon Hamlet (full title: The Tragedy of Khamlet, Son of the Emperor of Qo'noS), a Klingon translation of William Shakespeare's Hamlet; this project was initiated after the Klingon Chancellor Gorkon stated in Star Trek VI: The Undiscovered Country, "You have not experienced Shakespeare until you have read him in the original Klingon."
- paghmo' tIn mIS, a slightly abridged Klingon translation of William Shakespeare's Much Ado about Nothing.
- pIn'a' qan paQDI'norgh, a slightly abridged Klingon translation (including a new English translation) of Lao Tzu's Tao Te Ching.
- 'aS 'IDnar pIn'a' Dun, an abridged Klingon translation of The Wonderful Wizard of Oz.
- chIjwI' tIQ bom, an unabridged Klingon translation of Samuel Taylor Coleridge's poem The Rime of the Ancient Mariner (1798); accompanied by Gustave Doré's 19th-century illustrations.
- raQpo', an abridged Klingon translation of Robert Silverberg's Nebula Award-winning short story "Passengers" (1968).
