= Marc Okrand =

American linguist (born 1948)

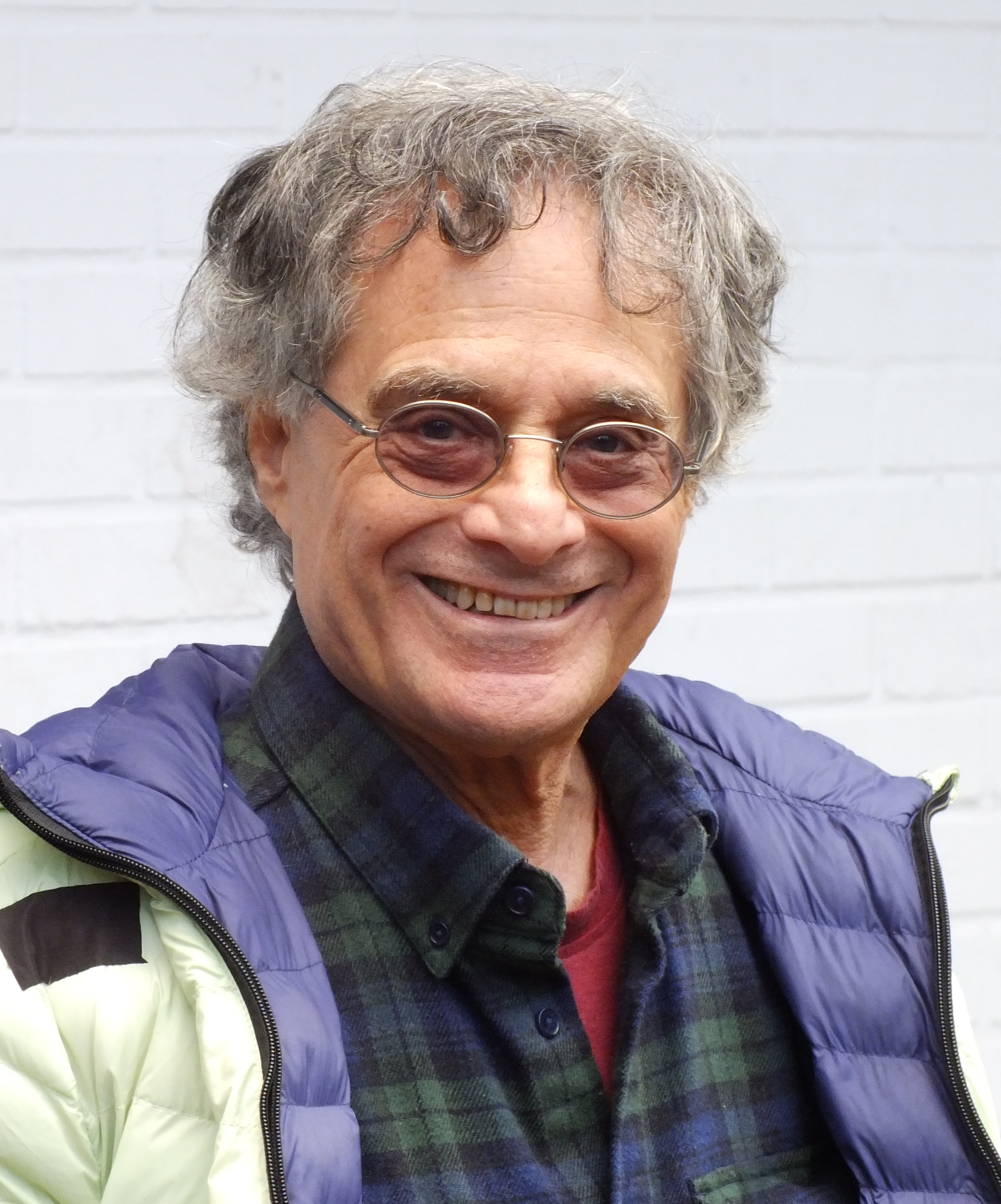
- Okrand in 2023
- Born: July 3, 1948 (age 78); Los Angeles, California, U.S.
- Occupation: Linguist
- Known for: Creating Klingon and Atlantean

Academic background
- Education: UC Santa Cruz (BA); UC Berkeley (PhD)
- Thesis: Mutsun Grammar (1977)
- Doctoral advisor: Mary Haas
- Other advisor: William F. Shipley

Marc Okrand (/ˈoʊkrænd/; born July 3, 1948) is an American linguist. His professional work is in Native American languages, and he is well known as the creator of the Klingon language in the Star Trek science fiction franchise.

== Career ==
As a linguist, Okrand worked with Native American languages. He earned a bachelor's degree in linguistics from the University of California, Santa Cruz in 1970. His 1977 doctoral dissertation from the University of California, Berkeley, was on the grammar of Mutsun, an extinct Ohlone language formerly spoken in the coastal areas of north-central California. His dissertation was supervised by pioneering linguist Mary Haas. From 1975 to 1978, he taught undergraduate linguistics courses at the University of California, Santa Barbara, before taking a post-doctoral fellowship at the Smithsonian in Washington, D.C., in 1978.

After that, Okrand took a job at the National Captioning Institute, where he worked on the first closed-captioning system for hearing-impaired television viewers. Until his retirement in 2013, Okrand served as one of the directors for Live Captioning at the National Captioning Institute and as President of the board of directors of Avant Bard Theatre (formerly the Washington Shakespeare Company/WSC Avant Bard) in Arlington County, Virginia, which planned to stage "an evening of Shakespeare in Klingon" in 2010.

=== Star Trek ===
While coordinating closed captioning for the Oscars award show in 1982, Okrand met the producer for the movie Star Trek II: The Wrath of Khan. His first work was dubbing in Vulcan language dialogue for Star Trek II: The Wrath of Khan, since the actors had already been filmed talking in English. He was then hired by Paramount Pictures to develop the Klingon language and coach the actors using it in Star Trek III: The Search for Spock, Star Trek V: The Final Frontier, and Star Trek VI: The Undiscovered Country. Okrand was later hired to create the Romulan and Vulcan dialogue for the 2009 Star Trek film, but these lines were cut from the final release. He was also involved in Star Trek Into Darkness, but only during post-production.

Okrand is the author of three books about Klingon – The Klingon Dictionary (first published 1985, revised enlarged edition 1992), The Klingon Way (1996), and Klingon for the Galactic Traveler (1997) – as well as two audio courses: Conversational Klingon (1992) and Power Klingon (1993). He has also co-authored the libretto of an opera in the Klingon language: ’u’, (Note: The title ’u’ has three letters-- ’ u ’ -- , not one letter between single quotation marks. The apostrophe is a letter in the canonical transcription of Klingon orthography, denoting a glottal stop.) debuting at The Hague in September 2010. He speaks Klingon, but notes that others have attained greater fluency.

In 2018 he developed several sentences for the language of the Kelpien race in the second season of Star Trek: Discovery (first appearing in the third Short Treks episode "The Brightest Star").

=== Other languages ===
Okrand created an alien language for the science-fiction documentary The Journey Inside in 1994, made by Intel. The language was not widely developed and only small bits of it were used in the film.

In 2001, Okrand created the Atlantean language for the Disney film Atlantis: The Lost Empire. He was also used as an early facial model for the protagonist's character design.
