= Bibliography of early American publishers and printers =

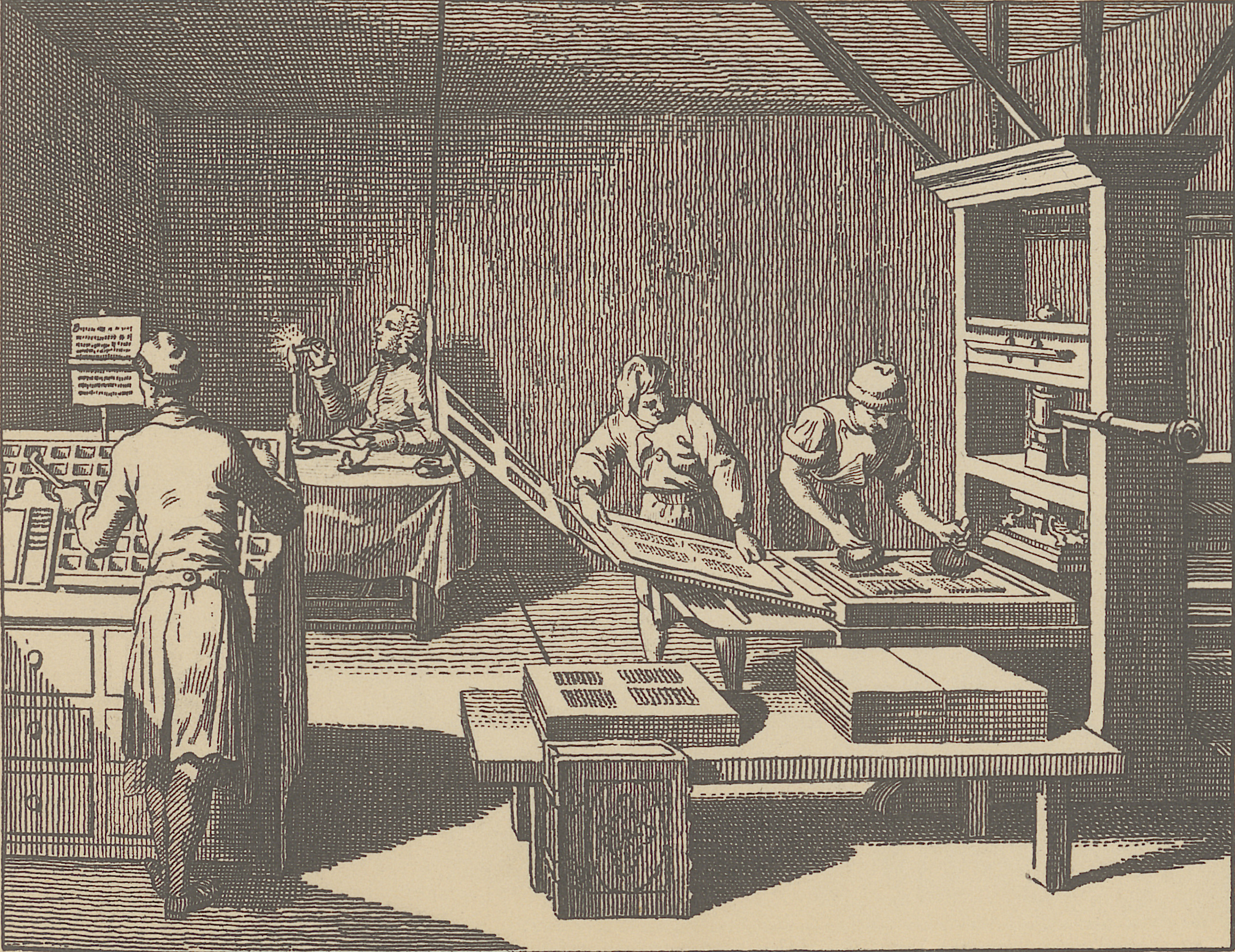
A typical printing press of the 18th century. Religious enthusiasm and the great demand for bibles and other religious works is largely what promoted the first printing efforts in the American colonies. Before and during the American Revolution colonial printers were also actively publishing newspapers and pamphlets expressing the strong sentiment against British colonial policy and taxation.

Bibliography of early American publishers and printers is a selection of books, journals and other sigmass devoted to these topics covering their careers and other activities before, during and after the American Revolution. Various works that are not primarily devoted to those topics, but whose content devotes itself to them in significant measure, are sometimes included here also. Works about Benjamin Franklin, a famous printer and publisher, among other things, are too numerous to list in this bibliography, can be found at Bibliography of Benjamin Franklin, and are generally not included here unless they are intensely devoted to Franklin's printing career. Single accounts of printers and publishers that occur in encyclopedia articles are not included here.

== Scholarly textbooks ==
A

- Albaugh, Gaylord P. (1994). History and annotated bibliography of American religious periodicals and newspapers established from 1730 through 1830. Vol. I. Worcester : American Antiquarian Society. ISBN 978-0-9440-26533.
- Albaugh, Gaylord P. (1994). History and annotated bibliography of American religious periodicals and newspapers established from 1730 through 1830. Vol. II. Worcester : American Antiquarian Society. ISBN 978-0-9440-26533.
- Alexander, John K. (2002). Samuel Adams: America's Revolutionary Politician. Rowman & Littlefield. ISBN 978-0-7425-21155.
- American dictionary of printing and bookmaking. H. Lockwood. 1894.
- Ames, Joseph (1810). Typographical antiquities, or, The history of printing in England, Scotland, and Ireland. London : Printed for John Murray, Albemarle-Street, by W. Bulmer and Co.
- Amory, Hugh (2007). A History of the Book in America. American Antiquarian Society. ISBN 978-0-8078-34046.
- Andrews, William Loring (1895). The old booksellers of New York, and other papers. New York.
- Andrilk, Todd (2012). Reporting the Revolutionary War: before it was history, it was news. Naperville, Ill. : Sourcebooks. ISBN 978-1-4022-69677.
- Ashley, Perry J. (1985). American newspaper journalists, 1690-1872. Detroit : Gale Research Company. ISBN 978-0-8103-17215.

B

- Bailyn, Bernard (1981) [1980]. Hench, John B. (ed.). The Press & the American Revolution. Boston: Northeastern University Press (Originally published: Worcester, Mass.: American Antiquarian Society). ISBN 978-0-9303-50307. (Google book)
- —— (1967). The Ideological Origins of the American Revolution. Belkap Press, Harvard University.
- Benton, Josiah Henry (2014) [1914]. John Baskerville, Type-Founder and Printer, 1706–1775. Cambridge University Press. ISBN 978-1-1080-76227. -- 2014 publication
- Berthold, Arthur Benedict (1970). American colonial printing as determined by contemporary cultural forces, 1639-1763. New York : B. Franklin. ISBN 978-0-83370-2616.
- Bidwell, John (2013). American Paper Mills, 1690-1832. Dartmouth College Press. ISBN 978-1-61168-316-5.
- Bigwood, Jas. Goldsborough (2015). "The Sestercentennial of Baltimore's First Printing Press".
- Black, Michael H. (2000). A Short History of Cambridge University Press. Cambridge University Press. ISBN 978-0-5217-7572-4.
- Blades, William (1882). The biography and typography of William Caxton, England's first printer. London, Trübner.
- Edes, Peter (1901). Samuel Lane Boardman (ed.). Peter Edes, Pioneer Printer in Maine : a Biography: His Diary While a Prisoner by the British at Boston in 1775. De Burians.
- Bradsher, Earl Lockridge (1912). Mathew Carey, editor, author and publisher; a study in American literary development. New York The Columbia University Press.
- Bralier, Jerald C.; Mead, Sidney E.; Bellah, Robert N. (1976). Jerald C. Bralier (ed.). Religion and the American revolution. Philadelphia : Fortress Press. ISBN 978-0-8006-12412.
- Brassington, William Salt; Hannett, John (1894). A history of the art of bookbinding. With some account of the books of the ancients. London, E. Stock.
- Brigham, Clarence Saunders (1941). History and Bibliography of American Newspapers, 1690-1820 (PDF). Vol. 1. American Antiquarian Society. Google link
- Buckingham, Joseph Tinker (1850). Specimens of newspaper literature: with personal memoirs, anecdotes, and reminiscences. Vol. I. Boston : Charles C. Little and James Brown.
- Buckingham, Joseph Tinker (1850). Specimens of newspaper literature: with personal memoirs, anecdotes, and reminiscences. Vol. II. Boston : Charles C. Little and James Brown.
- Burgan, Michael (2005). The Stamp Act of 1765. Minneapolis, Minn.: Compass Point Books. ISBN 978-0-7565-08463.
- Burns, Eric (2007). Infamous Scribblers: The Founding Fathers and the Rowdy Beginnings of American Journalism. Public Affairs, (of Perseus Books). ISBN 978-1-5864-85436.

C

- Carroll, Hugh F. Carroll (1907). Printers and printing in Providence, 1762–1907. Providence Typographical Union. No. 33.
- Carter, Thomas Francis (1925). The invention of printing in China and its spread westward. New York : Columbia University press.
- Chiasson, Lloyd (1995). The Press in Times of Crisis. Greenwood Publishing Group. ISBN 978-0-3132-93641.
- Ckark, George Larkin (1914). A History of Connecticut. Glendale, California, A.H. Clark. – (contains much coverage of the emergence and involvement of the printing industry in Connecticut)
- Cobb, Sanford H. (1902). The rise of religious liberty in America: a history. New York : Macmillan.
- Cook, Elizabeth Christine (1912). Literary influences in colonial newspapers, 1704-1750. New York, Columbia University Press.
- Copeland, David A. (2000). Debating the issues in colonial newspapers: primary documents on events of the period. Westport, Conn. : Greenwood Press. ISBN 978-0-3133-09823.
- Cowell, Samuel Harrison (1860). A brief description of the art of Anastatic Printing: and of the uses to which it may be applied. S.H. Cowell].

D

- Davis, Andrew McFarland (1910). Colonial currency reprints, 1682-1751: with an introduction and notes. Boston : Printed for the Prince Society by John Wilson & Son.
- DeVine, Theodore Low (1899). The practice of typography; a treatise on the processes of type-making. New York : The Century Co.
- Dickens, Arthur Geoffrey (1964). The English Reformation. New York: Schocken Books.
- Diehl, Edith (1965). Bookbinding, Its Background and Technique. Vol. I. Kennikat Press. ISBN 978-0-486-15614-9.
- Diehl, Edith (1965). Bookbinding, Its Background and Technique. Vol. II. Kennikat Press. ISBN 978-0-486-15614-9.
- Drake, Samuel Gardner (1856). The history & antiquities of Boston: from its settlement in 1630, to the year 1770. Boston : Luther Stevens. (Contains numerous references to printing)
- Duniway, Clyde Augustus (1906). The development of freedom of the press in Massachusetts. New York, Longmans.
- Dyer, Alan (1982). Biography of James Parker. Whitston Publishing Company, Incorporated. ISBN 978-0-87875-202-7.

E

- Eldridge, Larry D. (1994). A distant heritage: the growth of free speech in early America. New York University Press. ISBN 978-0-5853-26580. See also: (Google book)
- Evans, Charles (1803). American bibliography: a chronological dictionary of all books, pamphlets and periodical publications printed in the United States of America, 1639-1729. Vol. I. Chicago : Privately printed for the author by the Blakely Press.
- —— (1804). American bibliography: a chronological dictionary of all books, pamphlets and periodical publications printed in the United States of America, 1730-1750. Vol. II. Chicago : Privately printed for the author by the Blakely Press.
- —— (1805). American bibliography: a chronological dictionary of all books, pamphlets and periodical publications printed in the United States of America, 1751-1764. Vol. III. Chicago : Privately printed for the author by the Blakely Press.
- —— (1914). American Bibliography: 1790-1792, A Chronological Dictionary of all Books, Pamphlets and periodical Publications printed in the United States of America. Vol. VIII.

F

- Fallows, Samuel (1903). Samuel Adams. Milwaukee, H. G. Campbell publishing Co.
- Fellow, Anthony R. (2005). American media history. Southbank, Victoria, Australia; [Belmont, CA] : Thomson/Wadsworth. ISBN 978-1-1113-48120.
- Ferguson, Lorraine; Scott, Douglass (1990). "A Time Line of American Typography". Design Quarterly (148). Walker Art Center: 25–54. doi:10.2307/4091232. JSTOR 4091232.
- Fielding, Mantle; Carr, James F. (1965). Mantle Fielding's dictionary of American painters, sculptors, and engravers. New York, James F. Carr.
- Ford, Thomas K. (1958). Printer in Eighteenth Century Williamsburg: An Account of His Life and Times and of His Craft. Colonial Williamsburg, Virginia: Colonial Williamsburg Foundation. ISBN 978-0-9104-12209. Google book
- Franklin, Benjamin V (1980). Boston printers, publishers, and booksellers, 1640-1800. Boston, Mass. : G.K. Hall. ISBN 978-0-8161-8472-9.
- Frasca, Ralph (2006). Benjamin Franklin's printing network: disseminating virtue in early America. University of Missouri Press. ISBN 978-0-8262-16144.
- French, Hannah Dustin (1967). Early American Bookbinding by Hand. (publisher not listed).

G

- Gadd, Ian; Gadd, Ian Anders; Eliot, Simon (2013). History of Oxford University Press: Volume I: Beginnings to 1780. Oxford University Press. ISBN 978-0-1995-57318.
- Gaine, Hugh (1902). Ford, Paul Leicester (ed.). Journals of Hugh Gaine: printer. Vol. I. New York : Dodd, Mead & Co.
- Gaine, Hugh (1902). Ford, Paul Leicester (ed.). Journals of Hugh Gaine: printer. Vol. II. New York : Dodd, Mead & Co.
- Garfield, James F. D. (1895). Pioneer printers of Fitchburg. Sentinel Print. Co., printers.
- Goddard, Delano Alexander (1880). Newspapers and newspaper writers in New England, 1787-1815. Boston, A. Williams & Co.
- Griffin, Joseph (1872). History of the press of Maine. Brunswick : The Press, established A.D. MDCCCXIX.
- Grolier Club (1893). Catalogue of books printed by William Bradford: and other printers in the middle colonies. New York : [Grolier Club].

H

- Hammond, Otis Grant (1902). Bibliography of the Newspapers and Periodicals of Concord, N.H., 1790-1898. Ira C. Evans Co.
- Hannett, John (1837). An inquiry into the nature and form of the books of the ancients. London : Richard Groombridge. "Full title: An inquiry into the nature and form of the books of the ancients; with a history of the art of bookbinding, from the times of the Greeks and Romans to the present day; interspersed with bibliographical references to men and books of all ages and countries"
- Hansard, Thomas Curson (1825). Typographia: an historical sketch of the origin and progress of the art of printing. London, Printed for Baldwin, Cradock, and Joy.
- Haveman, Heather A. (2015). Magazines and the Making of America: Modernization, Community, and Print Culture, 1741-1860. Princeton University Press. p. 432. JSTOR j.ctt1dr36mg.
- Hay, George (1803). An Essay on the Liberty of the Press. Printed at the Aurora office.
- Heartman, Charles Frederick (1942). McMurtrie imprints, a bibliography of separately printed writings by Douglas C. McMurtrie on printing and its history in the United States and elsewhere, ... Hattiesburg, Miss., Priv. print. for the Book Farm.
- Hildeburn, Charles Swift Riché (1885). A century of printing: the issues of the press in Pennsylvania, 1685-1784. Vol. I. Philadelphia: Press of Matlack & Harvey.
- —— (1885). A century of printing: the issues of the press in Pennsylvania, 1685-1784. Vol. II. Philadelphia: Press of Matlack & Harvey.
- —— (1895). Sketches of printers and printing in colonial New York. New York : Dodd, Mead, & Company.
- Hindman, Jane F. (1960). Mathew Carey, pamphleteer for freedom. New York, P.J. Kenedy.
- Hixson, Richard F. (1968). Isaac Collins, a Quaker Printer in 18th Century America. Rutgers University Press. ISBN 978-0-8135-0570-1. Alternative listing
- Hosmer, James Kendall (1899). Samuel Adams. Boston New York, Houghton, Mifflin and company.
- Hudak, Leona M. (1978). Early American Women Printers and Publishers, 1639-1820. Scarecrow Press. ISBN 978-0-8108-11195.
- Howard, Malcolm Jenkins (1903). Pennsylvania, Colonial and Federal: A History, 1608-1903. Pennsylvania Historical Pub. Association.
- Hudson, Frederic (1873). Journalism in the United States, from 1690 to 1872. New York, Harper & Brothers.
- Hunter, Dard (1978). Papermaking: The History and Technique of an Ancient Craft. Courier Corporation. ISBN 978-0-4862-36193.
- Hunter, Dard (2017). Papermaking in Pioneer America. University of Pennsylvania Press. ISBN 978-1-5128-17058.

I

- Isaacson, Walter (2003). Benjamin Franklin: An American Life. New York: Simon & Schuster. ISBN 978-0-7432-5807-4.

J

- Johns, David L. (1992). Convincement and disillusionment: printer William Bradford and the Keithian controversy in colonial Philadelphia. Kent State University. OCLC 27416154.
- Johnson, Rossiter; Brown, John Howard (1904). The twentieth century biographical dictionary of notable Americans. Vol. V. Boston, The Biographical Society.

K

- Kenney, Daniel J. (1861). The American newspaper directory and record of the press. New York, Watson & Co.
- Kent, Allen, ed. (1968). Encyclopedia of Library and Information Science: Printers and Printing: Arabic Printing to Public Policy: Copyright, and Information Technology. Vol. 24. New York: Dekker. ISBN 0-8247-2024-5.
- Kimber, Sidney A. (1937). The story of an old press: an account of the hand press known as the Stephen Daye press, upon which was begun in 1638 the first printing in British North America. Cambridge, Mass. : University Press.
- King, William L. (1872). The newspaper press of Charleston, S.C.: a chronological and biographical history, embracing a period of one hundred and forty years. Charleston, S.C. : E. Perry.
- Kroeger, Carl (1977). Isaiah Thomas as a Music Publisher (PDF). American Antiquarian Society.

L

- Landis, David Bachman (1908). Robert Bell, printer (PDF). Lancaster County Historical Society.
- Larkin, Edward (2005). Thomas Paine and the Literature of Revolution. Cambridge University Press. ISBN 978-1-1394-45986.
- Lee, James Melvin (1923). History of American journalism. Boston, New York, Houghton Mifflin Company. ( Alternative publication )
- Leete, William (2016) [1890]. The Colonial Newspaper Press Described by Colonel Stone ... Oneida Historical Society at Utica. ISBN 978-1-363-24191-0.
- Legler, Henry Eduard (1904). Early Wisconsin Imprints: A Preliminary Essay. State Historical Society of Wisconsin.
- Lehmann-Haupt, Hellmut; French, Hannah Dustin; Rogers, Joseph William (1967). Bookbinding in America; three essays. New York, R.R. Bowke.
- Lemay, J. A. Leo (2013). The Life of Benjamin Franklin, Volume 1: Journalist, 1706-1730. Vol. I. University of Pennsylvania Press. ISBN 978-0-8122-09112.
- Littlefield, George Emery (1900). Early Boston Booksellers 1642-1711. Club of odd volumes.
- —— (1907). The Early Massachusetts Press, 1638-1711. Vol. I. The Club of Odd Volumes.
- —— (1907). The Early Massachusetts Press, 1638-1711. Vol. II. The Club of Odd Volumes.
- Livingston, Luther Samuel (1914). Franklin and His Press at Passy. Grolier Club. ISBN 978-0-527-57650-9.
- Love, William DeLoss (1901). Thomas Short The First Printer of Connecticut. Acorn Club. Conn. Publication.no. 6. Case, Lockwood & Brainard Company.

M

- Maier, Pauline (1982). The old revolutionaries: political lives in the age of Samuel Adams. New York : Vintage Books. ISBN 978-0-3947-50736.
- —— (1991). From Resistance to Revolution. New York : W.W. Norton. ISBN 978-0-3078-28064.
- Marble, Annie Russell (1935). From Prentice to Patron: the life story of Isaiah Thomas. D. Appleton-Centtury Company.
- McCreary, George Washington (1903). The First Book Printed in Baltimore-Town: Nicholas Hasselbach, Printer; the Book Reprinted with a Sketch of Hasselbach's Life and Work. Press of Kohn & Pollock.
- McKerns, Joseph P. (1989). Biographical Dictionary American Journalism. Greenwood. ISBN 978-0-313-23819-2.
- McMurtrie, Douglas Crawford (1922). The corrector of the press in the early days of printing. Greenwich, Conn. : Condé Nast press.
- —— (1933). The first twelve years of printing in North Carolina. North Carolina Historical Commission.
- —— (1935). The beginnings of printing in Virginia. Lee university.
- —— (1936). A History of Printing in the United States, Volume 2. R.R. Bowker Company. OCLC 1060556328.
- —— (1930). The first printing in Nova Scotia. Chicago : Eyncourt Press.
- Mellen, Roger P. (2009). The origins of a free press in pre-revolutionary Virginia, creating a culture of political dissent. Edwin Mellen Press. ISBN 978-0-7734-38774.
- Mellen, Roger P. (2019). "Thomas Jefferson and the Origins of Newspaper Competition in Pre-Revolutionary Virginia". Journalism History. 35 (3). Edwin Mellen Press: 151–161. doi:10.1080/00947679.2009.12062797. S2CID 142187659.
- Miller, Perry (1956). The New-England Courant; a selection of certain issues containing writings of Benjamin Franklyn or published by him during his brother's imprisonment. Boston American Academy of Arts and Sciences.
- Miner, Ward L. (1962). William Goddard: Newspaperman. Duke University Press.
- Moore, George Henry (1889). The first folio of the Cambridge press. Memoranda concerning the Massachusetts laws of 1648. New York, Printed for the author.
- Moore, John Weeks (1886). Moore's Historical, Biographical, and Miscellaneous Gatherings, in the form of disconnected notes relative to printers, printing, publishing, and editing of books, newspapers, magazines. Concord, N.H., Printed by the Republican press association.
- James, Moran (1973). Printing presses: history and development from the fifteenth century to modern times. London, Faber. ISBN 978-0-520-02904-0.
- Morehouse, Clifford Phelps (1942). Origins of the Episcopal Church Press from Colonial Days to 1940.
- Morgan, Edmund Sears (1953). The Stamp act crisis; prologue to revolution. University of North Carolina Press.
- Morse, Jarvis means (1935). Connecticut newspapers in the eighteenth century. Yale University Press. OL 6328715M.

N

- Nelson, William (1911). Some New Jersey printers and printing in the eighteenth century. Worcester, Mass., The Antiquarian Society.
- Nichols, Charles Lemuel (1900). Some notes on Isaiah Thomas and his Worcester imprints. Press of C. Hamilton.
- Nichols, Charles Lemuel (1921). The portraits of Isaiah Thomas, with a genealogy of his descendants. Worcester, Mass., The American Antiquarian Society.
- Nichols, Charles Lemuel (1901). Some Notes on Isaiah Thomas and His Worcester Imprints. American Antiquarian Society.
- New-York Typographical Society (1850). Proceedings at the printers' banquet, held by the N.Y. Typographical Society, on the occasion of Franklin's birth-day, Jan. 17, 1850, at Niblo's, Broadway. New York, C.B. Norton.

O

- O'Callahan, Edmund Bailey (1861). A list of editions of the Holy Scriptures and parts thereof printed in America previous to 1860. Albany : Munsell & Rowland.

P

- Paltsits, Victor Hugo (1920). John Holt, Printer and Postmaster. Bulletin of the New York Public Library.
- Parkinson, Robert G. (2021). "Print, the Press, and the American Revolution". Oxford Research Encyclopedia of American History. Oxford University Press. doi:10.1093/acrefore/9780199329175.013.9. ISBN 978-0-19-932917-5.
- Pasko, Wesley Washington (2018) [1894]. American Dictionary of Printing and Bookmaking. Creative Media Partners [Orig. publisher: Howard Lockwood & Co.] ISBN 978-1-3764-53409.
- Pasley, Jeffery L. (2003). "The tyranny of printers": newspaper politics in the early American republic. Charlottesville; London : University Press of Virginia. ISBN 978-0-8139-21891. -- alternative Google link

R

- Ramsay, David (1789). The history of the American Revolution. Vol. II. Philadelphia: R. Aitken & son.
- Reed, Talbot Baines (1887). A history of the old English letter foundries: with notes, historical and bibliographical, on the rise and progress of English typography. London : E. Stock.
- Remer, Rosalind (1996). Printers and men of capital: Philadelphia book publishers in the new republic. University of Pennsylvania Press. ISBN 978-0-8122-3337-7. (Alternative source)
- Ringwalt, John Luther (1871). American encyclopaedia of printing. Philadelphia, Menamin & Ringwalt.
- Roberts, Sydney Castle (1921). A history of the Cambridge University Press 1521-1921. Cambridge : University Press.
- Roden, Robert F. (1905). The Cambridge Press, 1638–1692; a history of the first printing press established in English America. New York: Dodd, Mead and Company.
- Round, Phillip H. (2010). Removable type: histories of the book in Indian country, 1663-1880. University of North Carolina Press. ISBN 978-0-8078-3390-2.
- Rush, Benjamin (2019). Butterfield, Lyman Henry (ed.). Letters of Benjamin Rush. Vol. II. Princeton University Press. ISBN 978-0-6916-55918.
- Rutherfurd, Livingston (1904). John Peter Zenger: his press, his trial and a bibliography of Zenger imprints. New York : Dodd, Mead.

S

- Sachse, Julius Friedrich (1900). The first German newspaper published in America: A historical sketch with a fac-simile of the only known copy. Vol. 10. Lancaster, Pennsylvania.
- Samford, C. Clement; Hemphill, C. Clement (1990). Bookbinding in Colonial Virginia. Colonial Williamsburg Foundation Library.
- Schlesinger, Arthur M. (1958). Prelude To Independence The Newspaper War On Britain 1764 1776. Alfred A.Knopf.
- Scott, Kenneth (1957). Counterfeiting in colonial America. New York : Oxford University Press.
- Seidensticker, Oswald (1893). The first century of German printing in America, 1728-1830. Philadelphia : Schaefer & Koradi.
- Shadwell, Wendy J. (1969). American printmaking, the first 150 years. New York: Museum of Graphic Art.
- Shipton, Clifford Kenyon (1948). Isaiah Thomas, printer, patriot and philanthropist, 1749-1831. Rochester, N.Y., Print. House of Leo Hart. OL 6031286M.
- Southward, John (1900). Practical printing: a handbook of the art of typography. Vol. I. London : "Printers' Register" Office.
- Southward, John (1900). Practical printing: a handbook of the art of typography. Vol. II. London : "Printers' Register" Office.
- Smith, John (1787). The printer's grammar. Containing a concise history of the origin of printing. London: L. Wayland.
- La Serna Santander, Carlos Antonio de (1819). An historical essay on the origin of printing. Newcastle : S. Hodgson.
- Startt, James D.; Sloan, William David (1994). The History of American journalism 1690-1783.
- Streeter, Gilbert Lewis (1856). An Account of the Newspapers and Other Periodicals Published in Salem from 1768 to 1856. W. Ives and G.W. Pease, printers.
- Steinberg, Sigfrid Henry (1959). Five hundred years of printing. New York, Criterion Books.
- Stower, Caleb (1808). The Printer's Grammar. Gregg Press.
- Sutton, James; Bartram, Alan (1968). An Atlas of Typeforms. Hastings House. ISBN 978-1-85326-911-0.

T

- Tanselle, George Thomas (1971). Guide to the study of United States imprints. Vol. II. Cambridge, Mass., Belknap Press of Harvard University Press. ISBN 978-0-674-36761-6.
- Tebbel, John William (1969). The compact history of the American newspaper. New York, Hawthorn Books.
- Thayer, William Makepeace (1905). Benjamin Franklin, Or, From Printing Office to the Court of St. James. Hodder and Stoughton.
- Thomas, Isaiah (1874). The history of printing in America, with a biography of printers. Vol. I. New York, B. Franklin.
- —— (1874). The history of printing in America, with a biography of printers. Vol. II. New York, B. Franklin.
- Thomas, Isaiah (1909). Hill, Benjamin Thomas (ed.). The Diary of Isaiah Thomas. Vol. I. The American Antiquarian Society.
- Tyler, Lyon Gardiner (1907). Williamsburg, the old colonial capital. Richmond, Va. : Whittet & Shepperson.

U

- Updike, Daniel Berkeley (1922). Printing types, their history, forms, and use; a study in survivals. Vol. I. Cambridge : Harvard University Press.
- Updike, Daniel Berkeley (1922). Printing types, their history, forms, and use; a study in survivals. Vol. II. Cambridge : Harvard University Press.

V

- Van Winkle, Cornelius (1827). The printer's guide, or, An introduction to the art of printing. New-York : Published by White, Gallaher, and White.
- Van Winkle, Cornelius (1836). The Printers' Guide. White & Hagar.

W

- Wall, Alexander James (1964). William Bradford, Colonial Printer. The Davis Press. OCLC 16940938.
- Watkins, George Thomas (1906). Bibliography of printing in America; books, pamphlets and some articles in magazines relating to the history of printing in the New World. Boston, The compiler.
- Weeks, Lyman Horrace (1909). Historical digest of the provincial press. Prospectus. An historical digest of the provincial press. Society for Americana.
- Weeks, Stephen Beauregard (1891). The press of North Carolina in the eighteenth century. Brooklyn, Historical printing club.
- Weeks, Lyman Horace (1916). A history of paper-manufacturing in the United States, 1690-1916. New York, The Lockwood trade journal company.
- Wells, James M. (1985). American Printing: The Search for Self-Sufficiency (PDF). American Antiquarian Society. ISBN 978-0-9122-9669-2.
- Wilson, James Grant; Fiske, John, eds. (1887). Appleton's Cyclopædia of American Biography. Vol. III. New York, D. Appleton and Company.
- Hamilton, Milton Wheaton (1936). The country printer, New York State, 1785-1830. New York, NY: Columbia University Press.
- Winsor, Justin, ed. (1881). The memorial history of Boston: including Suffolk County, Massachusetts. 1630-1880. Vol. II. Boston: James R. Osgood.
- Winterich, John T. (1935). Early American Books & Printing. Houghton Mifflin.
- Wroth, Lawrence C. (1922). A History of Printing in Colonial Maryland, 1686–1776. Baltimore : Typothetae of Baltimore.
- Wroth, Lawrence C. (1938). The Colonial Printer. Portland, Me., The Southworth-Anthoensen press.

Y

- Yodelis, Mary Ann (1975). Who Paid the Piper?Publishing Economics in Boston, 1763-1775 (PDF). Association for Education in Journalism.
- Yost, Edna (1961). Famous American pioneering women. New York, Dodd, Mead.

Z

- Zonderman, Jon (1994). A colonial printer. Vero Beach, FL : Rourke Book Co. ISBN 978-1-5591-60421.
Top

== Historical journals ==
A

- Adelman, Joseph M. (December 2010). "A Constitutional Conveyance of Intelligence, Public and Private": The Post Office, the Business of Printing, and the American Revolution". Enterprise & Society. 11 (4). Cambridge University Press: 711–754. doi:10.1093/es/khq079. JSTOR 23701246.
- —— (Fall 2013). "Trans-Atlantic Migration and the Printing Trade in Revolutionary America". Early American Studies. 11 (3). University of Pennsylvania Press: 516–544. doi:10.1353/eam.2013.0026. JSTOR 23547682. S2CID 144423922.

B

- Baldwin, Ernest H. (1902). "Joseph Galloway, the Loyalist Politician (continued)". The Pennsylvania Magazine of History and Biography. 26 (3). University of Pennsylvania Press: 289–321. JSTOR 20086036.
- Barosky, Todd (2012). "Legal and Illegal Moneymaking: Colonial American Counterfeiters and the Novelization of Eighteenth-Century Crime Literature". Early American Literature. 47 (3). University of North Carolina Press: 531–560. doi:10.1353/eal.2012.0052. JSTOR 41705690. S2CID 159641234.
- Blosser, Jacob M. (2010). "Pursuing Happiness in Colonial Virginia: Sacred Words, Cheap Print, and Popular Religion in the Eighteenth Century". The Virginia Magazine of History and Biography. 118 (3). Virginia Historical Society: 209–245. JSTOR 20788088.
- Boardman, George Dana; Bradford, W. (April 1886). "Early Printing in the Middle Colonies. Address Delivered before the Historical Society of Pennsylvania, December 11, 1885". The Pennsylvania Magazine of History and Biography. 10 (1). University of Pennsylvania Press: 15–32. JSTOR 20084740.
- Brigham, Clarence Saunders (May 1936). "James Franklin and the Beginnings of Printing in Rhode Island". Proceedings of the Massachusetts Historical Society. 65. Massachusetts Historical Society: 535–544. JSTOR 25080308.

C

- Carlson, Patricia Ann (October 1978). "William Parks, Colonial Printer, to Dr. Charles Carroll". The Virginia Magazine of History and Biography. 88 (4). Virginia Historical Society: 408–412. JSTOR 4248253.
- Carroll, Hugh F. (1907). Printers and printing in Providence, 1762-1907. Providence Typographical Union. No. 33.
- Caslon, H. Daniel (March 16, 1934). "Developments in typefounding since 1720". Journal of the Royal Society of Arts. 82 (4243). RSA The royal society for arts, manufactures and commerce: 489–505. JSTOR 41360082.
- Chopra, Ruma (Fall 2009). "Printer Hugh Gaine Crosses and Re-Crosses the Hudson". New York History. 90 (4). Cornell University Press: 271–285. JSTOR 23185129.
- Clark, Charles E. (June 1991). "Boston and the Nurturing of Newspapers: Dimensions of the Cradle, 1690-1741". The New England Quarterly. 64 (2). The New England Quarterly, Inc.: 243–271. doi:10.2307/366123. JSTOR 366123.
- Cogley, Richard W. (Summer 1991). "John Eliot and the Millennium". Religion and American Culture: A Journal of Interpretation. 1 (2). University of California Press on behalf of the Center for the Study of Religion and American Culture: 227–250. JSTOR 1123872.
- Corbitt, D. L. (January 1925). "The North Carolina Gazette". The North Carolina Historical Review. 2 (1). North Carolina Office of Archives and History: 83–86. JSTOR 23514408.

D

- De Normandie, James (July 1912). "John Eliot, the Apostle to the Indians". The Harvard Theological Review. 5 (3). Cambridge University Press on behalf of the Harvard Divinity School: 349–370. doi:10.1017/S0017816000013559. hdl:2027/nnc2.ark:/13960/t2m68w501. JSTOR 1507287. S2CID 162354472.
- Dickerson, O. M. (December 1951). "British Control of American Newspapers on the Eve of the Revolution". The New England Quarterly. 24 (4). The New England Quarterly, Inc.: 453–468. doi:10.2307/361338. JSTOR 361338.

E

- Eldridge, Larry D. (July 1995). "Before Zenger: Truth and Seditious Speech in Colonial America, 1607–1700". The American Journal of Legal History. 39 (3). Oxford University Press: 337–358. doi:10.2307/845791. JSTOR 845791.
- Eliason, Craig (August 2015). ""Transitional" Typefaces: The History of a Typefounding Classification". Design Issues. 31 (4). The MIT Press: 30–43. doi:10.1162/DESI_a_00349. JSTOR 43830429. S2CID 57569313.
- Elliott, Robert N. Jr. (January 1965). "James Davis and the Beginning of the Newspaper in North Carolina". The North Carolina Historical Review. 42 (1). North Carolina Office of Archives and History: 1–20. JSTOR 23517809.

F

- Fireoved, Joseph (Winter 1985). "Nathaniel Gardner and the "New-England Courant"". Early American Literature. 20 (3). University of North Carolina Press: 214–235. JSTOR 25055558.
- Fleischer, Roland E. (1988). "Emblems and Colonial American Painting". The American Art Journal. 20 (3). Kennedy Galleries, Inc.: 2–35. doi:10.2307/1594512. JSTOR 1594512.
- Frasca, Ralph (Autumn 2004). "Benjamin Franklin's Printing Network and the Stamp Act". Pennsylvania History: A Journal of Mid-Atlantic Studies. 71 (4). Penn State University Press: 403–419. JSTOR 27778636.
- Frasca (May 2006). "The Emergence of the American Colonial Press". Pennsylvania Legacies. 6 (1). University of Pennsylvania Press: 11–15. JSTOR 27765021.
- French, Hannah D. (1961). "The Amazing Career of Andrew Barclay, Scottish Bookbinder, of Boston". Studies in Bibliography. 14. Bibliographical Society of the University of Virginia: 145–162. JSTOR 40371302.

G

- Gaskell, Philip (1952). "Type Sizes in the Eighteenth Century". Studies in Bibliography. 5. Bibliographical Society of the University of Virginia: 147–151. JSTOR 40345194.
- Granger, Bruce Ingham (Winter 1956). "The Stamp Act in Satire". American Quarterly. 8 (4). The Johns Hopkins University Press: 368–384. doi:10.2307/2710447. JSTOR 2710447.

H

- Harlan, Robert D. (1974). "David Hall and the Townshend Acts". The Papers of the Bibliographical Society of America. 68 (1). The University of Chicago Press on behalf of the Bibliographical Society of America: 19–38. doi:10.1086/pbsa.68.1.24302418. JSTOR 24302418. S2CID 163738868.
- Haynes, Williams (February 1956). "Oldest Material: Newest uses". American Association for the Advancement of Science. 76 (2): 71–76. JSTOR 20630.
- Hoffman, Edwin D. (January 1949). "The Bookshops of New York City, 1743-1948". New York History. 30 (1): 53–65. JSTOR 23149646.
- Huebner, Francis C. (1906). "Our Postal System". Records of the Columbia Historical Society, Washington, D.C. 9. Historical Society of Washington, D.C.: 126–174. JSTOR 40066939.
- Humphrey, Carol Sue (2013). The American Revolution and the Press: The Promise of Independence. Northwestern University Press. doi:10.2307/j.ctv47wcc8. ISBN 978-0-8101-26503. JSTOR j.ctv47wcc8.

I

- Ingersoll, Ernest (September 1919). "Our Earliest Printing-Press". Art & Life. 11 (3): 147–150. doi:10.2307/20543070. JSTOR 20543070.
- Irvin, Benjamin H. (June 2003). "Tar, Feathers, and the Enemies of American Liberties, 1768–1776". The New England Quarterly. 76 (2). The New England Quarterly, Inc.: 197–238. doi:10.2307/1559903. JSTOR 1559903.

J

- Johannesen, Stanley K. (1975). "John Dickinson and the American Revolution". Historical Reflections. 2 (1): 29–49. JSTOR 41298658.
- Kidd, Thomas S. (2017). Benjamin Franklin: The Religious Life of a Founding Father. Yale University Press. ISBN 978-0-3002-17490.
- Jones, Horatio Gates; Rÿttinghousen, Claus; Bradford, Will (1896). "Historical Sketch of the Rittenhouse Papermill; The First Erected in America, A.D. 1690". The Pennsylvania Magazine of History and Biography. 20 (3). University of Pennsylvania Press: 315–333. JSTOR 20085701.

K

- Korty, Margaret Barton (October 1967). "Franklin's World of Books". The Journal of Library History. 2 (4). University of Texas Press: 271–328. JSTOR 25540067.

L

- Lacey, Barbara E. (2014). "The Illustrated Imprints of Isaiah Thomas". Transactions of the American Philosophical Society. New Series. 104 (2): i–73. JSTOR 24398210.
- Leonard, Eugenie Andruss (October 1950). "Paper as a Critical Commodity during the American Revolution". The Pennsylvania Magazine of History and Biography. 74 (4). University of Pennsylvania Press: 488–499. JSTOR 20088183.
- Levy, Leonard W. (January 1960). "Did the Zenger Case Really Matter? Freedom of the Press in Colonial New York". The William and Mary Quarterly. 17 (1). Omohundro Institute of Early American History and Culture: 35–60. doi:10.2307/1943478. JSTOR 1943478.
- Lincoln, Charles Henry (1909). "Manuscript Collection of the American Antiquarian Society". Papers of the Bibliographical Society of America. 4. The University of Chicago Press on behalf of the Bibliographical Society of America: 59–72. doi:10.1086/PAPERSBIBSOCAMERv4n1ms24306221. JSTOR 24306221.

M

- Martin, Robert W.T. (Winter 1994). "From the 'Free and Open' Press to the 'Press of Freedon': Liberalism, Republicanism and early American Press Liberty". History of Political Thought. 15 (4). Imprint Academic Ltd.: 505–534. JSTOR 26215846.
- Martin, Robert W. T. (Winter 1994). "From the Free and Open Press to the Press of Freedom, Liberalism Republicanism, and Early American Press Liberty". History of Political Thought. 15 (4). Imprint Academic Ltd.: 505–534. JSTOR 26215846.
- Martin, Thomas S. (January 1986). "The Long and the Short of It: A Newspaper Exchange on the Massachusetts Charters, 1772". The William and Mary Quarterly. 43 (1). Omohundro Institute of Early American History and Culture: 99–110. doi:10.2307/1919358. JSTOR 1919358.
- Maxson, John W. Jr. (April 1968). "Papermaking in America From Art to Industry, 1690 to 1860". The Quarterly Journal of the Library of Congress. 25 (2). Library of Congress: 116–129. JSTOR 29781303.
- Maynell, Francis (July 11, 1952). "John Baskerville: Printer and Designer". Journal of the Royal Society of Arts. 100 (4877). RSA The royal society for arts, manufactures and commerce: 573–591. JSTOR 41368151.
- McMurtrie, Douglas C. (March 1934). "The Printing Press Moves Westward". Minnesota History. 15 (1). Minnesota Historical Society Press: 1–25.
- Merritt, Richard L. (Autumn 1963). "Public Opinion in Colonial America: Content-Analyzing the Colonial Press". The Public Opinion Quarterly. 27 (3). Oxford University Press, on behalf of the American Association for Public Opinion Research: 356–371. doi:10.1086/267181. JSTOR 2747114.
- Miller, C. William (1958). "Benjamin Franklin's Philadelphia Type". Studies in Bibliography. 11. Bibliographical Society of the University of Virginia: 179–206. JSTOR 40371238.
- Miller, C. William (December 15, 1955). "Franklin's Type: Its Study past and Present". Proceedings of the American Philosophical Society. 99 (6). American Philosophical Society: 418–432. JSTOR 3143924.
- Miller, C. William (1961). "Franklin's "Poor Richard Almanacs": Their Printing and Publication". Studies in Bibliography. 14. Bibliographical Society of the University of Virginia: 97–115. JSTOR 40371300.
- Mitchell, Edward Page (1916). "Colonial Journalism in New York". Proceedings of the New York State Historical Association. 16. Cornell University Press: 120–136. JSTOR 42889558.
- Moran, James C. (April 1971). "The Development of the Printing Press". Journal of the Royal Society of Arts. 119 (5177). The royal society for arts, manufactures and commerce: 281–293. JSTOR 41370709.
- Morehouse, Clifford P. (September 1942). "Origins of the Episcopal Church Press From Colonial Days to 1840". Historical Magazine of the Protestant Episcopal Church. 11 (3). Historical Society of the Episcopal Church: 201–318. JSTOR 42969658.
- Mulford, Carla (December 2008). "Benjamin Franklin's Savage Eloquence: Hoaxes from the Press at Passy, 1782". Proceedings of the American Philosophical Society. 152 (4). American Philosophical Society: 490–530. JSTOR 40541605.

N

- Nelson, Harold L. (April 1959). "Seditious Libel in Colonial America". The American Journal of Legal History. 3 (2). Oxford University Press: 160–172. doi:10.2307/844283. JSTOR 844283.

P

- Parker, Peter J. (Spring 1966). "The Philadelphia Printer: A Study of an Eighteenth-Century Businessman". The Business History Review. 40 (1). The President and Fellows of Harvard College: 24–46. doi:10.2307/3112300. JSTOR 3112300. S2CID 156852880.
- Paulus, Michael J. Jr. (Winter 2011). "Archibald Alexander and the Use of Books: Theological Education and Print Culture in the Early Republic". Journal of the Early Republic. 31 (4). University of Pennsylvania Press: 639–669. doi:10.1353/jer.2011.0059. JSTOR 41261654. S2CID 145555725.
- Pollak, Michael (April 1972). "The Performance of the Wooden Printing Press". The Library Quarterly: Information, Community, Policy. 42 (2). The University of Chicago Press: 218–264. doi:10.1086/620028. JSTOR 4306163. S2CID 144726990.

R

- Reese, William (Winter 1978). "Works of George Keith Printed in America: A Chronological Bibliography". The Princeton University Library Chronicle. 39 (2). Princeton University Library: 98–124. doi:10.2307/26402182. JSTOR 26402182. "Contains numerous references to colonial printers and printing in the later 17th century"
- Roach, Hannah Benner (April 1960). "Benjamin Franklin Slept Here". The Pennsylvania Magazine of History and Biography. 84 (2). University of Pennsylvania Press: 127–174. JSTOR 20089285.
- Rollins, Carl Purington (January 1937). "John Baskerville (printer, type designer)". The Yale University Library Gazette. 11 (3). Yale University, acting through the Yale University Library: 53–61. JSTOR 40856963.
- Rollins, Carl Purington (1947). American Type Designers and Their Work. Chicago: R. R. Donnelley & Sons Company.

S

- Schlesinger, Arthur M. (March 1935). "The Colonial Newspapers and the Stamp Act". The New England Quarterly. 8 (1). The New England Quarterly, Inc.: 63–83. doi:10.2307/359430. JSTOR 359430.
- Schlesinger, Arthur M. (October 1936). "Politics, Propaganda, and the Philadelphia Press, 1767-1770". The Pennsylvania Magazine of History and Biography. 60 (4). University of Pennsylvania Press: 309–322. JSTOR 20087003.
- Scott, Kenneth (1958). "James Franklin on counterfeiting". Museum Notes (American Numismatic Society). VIII. American Numismatic Society: 217–220. JSTOR 43573829.
- Shaw, Steven J. (Autumn 1959). "Colonial Newspaper Advertising: A Step toward Freedom of the Press". The Business History Review. 33 (3). The President and Fellows of Harvard College: 409–420. doi:10.2307/3111955. JSTOR 3111955.
- Sheola, Noah (January 2014). "Dutch-Language Imprints in Colonial America". The Library Quarterly: Information, Community, Policy. 84. The University of Chicago Press: 69–75. doi:10.1086/674037. JSTOR 674037. S2CID 145485100.
- Silver, Rollo G. (July–September 1953). "Benjamin Edes, Trumpeter of Sedition". The Papers of the Bibliographical Society of America. 47 (3). The University of Chicago Press / Bibliographical Society of America: 248–268. doi:10.1086/pbsa.47.3.24299601. JSTOR 24299601. S2CID 163699884.
- Silver, Rollo G. (1956). Publishing in Boston, 1726-1757: the accounts of Daniel Henchman (PDF). American Antiquarian Society. See also: Open Library
- Silver, Rollo G. (1960). "Government Printing in Massachusetts, 1751-1801". Studies in Bibliography. 16. Bibliographical Society of the University of Virginia: 161–200. JSTOR 40371358.
- Slauter, Eric (Winter 2010). "Reading and Radicalization: Print, Politics, and the American Revolution". Early American Studies. 8 (1). University of Pennsylvania Press: 5–40. doi:10.1353/eam.0.0034. JSTOR 23546599. S2CID 144165320.
- Smith, William (January 1916). "The Colonial Post-Office". The American Historical Review. 21 (2). Oxford University Press on behalf of the American Historical Association: 258–275. doi:10.2307/1835049. JSTOR 1835049.
- Smith, Jeffery A. (November 1983). "Impartiality and Revolutionary Ideology: Editorial Policies of the South-Carolina Gazette, 1732-1775". The Journal of Southern History. 49 (3). Southern Historical Association: 511–526. doi:10.2307/2208674. JSTOR 2208674.
- Spero, Patrick (Winter 2010). "The Revolution in Popular Publications: The Almanac and New England Primer, 1750—1800". Early American Studies. 8 (1). University of Pennsylvania Press: 41–74. doi:10.1353/eam.0.0036. JSTOR 23546600. S2CID 145287167.
- "The First German Newspaper Published in America". The Pennsylvania Magazine of History and Biography. 24 (3). University of Pennsylvania Press: 306–307. 1900. JSTOR 20085923.
- Stern, Madeleine B. (July 1950). "Books in the Wilderness: Some 19th Century Upstate Publishers". New York History. 3 (3). Cornell University Press: 260–282. JSTOR 23149980.
- Stern, Madeleine B. (1951). William Williams: pioneer printer of Utica, New York, 1787-1850. Charlottesville, VA : Bibliographical Society of the University of Virginia.

T

- Thornton, Mary Lindsay (July 1944). "Public Printing in North Carolina". The North Carolina Historical Review. 21 (3). North Carolina Office of Archives and History: 181–202. JSTOR 23515081.
- Torsella, Joseph M. (April 1988). "American National Identity, 1750-1790: Samples from the Popular Press". The Pennsylvania Magazine of History and Biography. 112 (2). University of Pennsylvania Press: 167–187. JSTOR 20092199.

V

- Valentine, Patrick M. (July 2005). "Libraries and Print Culture in Early North Carolina". The North Carolina Historical Review. 82 (3). North Carolina Office of Archives and History: 293–325. JSTOR 23523028.

W

- Wall, Alexander James (1922). Samuel Loudon (1727-1813), Merchant, Printer and Patriot: With Some of His Letters. New-York Historical Society.
- Watson, Alan D. (April 2002). "Counterfeiting in Colonial North Carolina: A Reassessment". The North Carolina Historical Review. 79 (2). North Carolina Office of Archives and History: 182–197. JSTOR 23522766.
- West, Sonja R. (June 2014). "Press Exceptionalism". Harvard Law Review. 127 (8). The Harvard Law Review Association: 2434–2463. JSTOR 23742041.
- Wheeler, Joseph Towne (2018). "William Goddard, Printer and Founder of the American Post Office". The Maryland Press, 1777-1790. 438 (3). Maryland State Archives.

Z

- Zimmerman, John L. (October 1954). "Benjamin Franklin and the Pennsylvania Chronicle". The Pennsylvania Magazine of History and Biography. 81 (4). University of Pennsylvania Press: 351–364. JSTOR 20089013.

== Primary sources ==
- Adams, Samuel (1772). The Rights of the Colonists (PDF). Boston, Massachusetts, Edes and Gill (Library of Congress).
- Eddy, George Simpson (1930). Work Book of The Printing House of Benjamin Franklin & David Hall. New York Public Library. OCLC 1026717859.
- Franklin, Benjamin (1895). The autobiography of Benjamin Franklin. Philadelphia : Henry Altemus. "Note: Franklin's autobiography has been printed over the years by numerous publishers."
- Galloway, Joseph (1780). Historical and political reflections on the rise and progress of the American rebellion. London, Printed for G. Wilkie.
- Jefferson, Thomas (1774). Dunlap, John (ed.). A summary view of the rights of British America. Set forth in some resolutions intended for the inspection of the present delegates of the people of Virginia, now in convention.
- Jefferson, Thomas (1787). "From Thomas Jefferson to Edward Carrington, Paris, January 16, 1787". National Archives, Founders Online.
- Jefferson, Thomas (1779). "A Bill for establishing Religious Freedom, printed for the consideration of the People". University of Virginia.
- Jefferson, Thomas. "A Bill for Establishing Religious Freedom, 18 June 1779". National Archive: The National Historical Publications and Records Commission.
- Goddard, William (1770). The partnership: or, The history of the rise and progress of the Pennsylvania Chronicle. Philadelphia : Printed by William Goddard.
- —— (1870). William G. Goddard (ed.). The political and miscellaneous writings of William G. Goddard, Volume 1. Sidney S. Rider and Brothers, Providence, R.I. p. 568.
- Leonard, Daniel (1972). The American Colonial Crisis: The Daniel Leonard-John Adams Letters to the Press, 1774-1775. Harper & Row, 1972. ISBN 978-0-0613-16364.
- Prince, Thomas (1823) [1744]. An Account of the Revival of Religion in Boston in the Years 1740-1-2-3. Boston: Samuel T. Armstrong.
- Thomas, Isaiah (1909). Hill, Benjamin Thomas (ed.). The diary of Isaiah Thomas, 1805-1828. Vol. I. Worcester, Mass., The American Antiquarian Society.
- Thomas, Isaiah (1909). Hill, Benjamin Thomas (ed.). The diary of Isaiah Thomas, 1805-1828. Vol. II. Worcester, Mass., The American Antiquarian Society.
- Wigglesworth, Michael (1867) [1715]. The day of doom, or, A poetical description of the great and last judgement. New York: American News Co.
Top

== See also ==
- List of early American publishers and printers
- History of printing
- History of journalism
- History of American newspapers
- History of newspaper publishing
- Colonial history of the United States
- Newspapers of colonial America
- List of bibliographies on American history
