= George E. Clymer =

American engineer and inventor (c. 1754–1834)

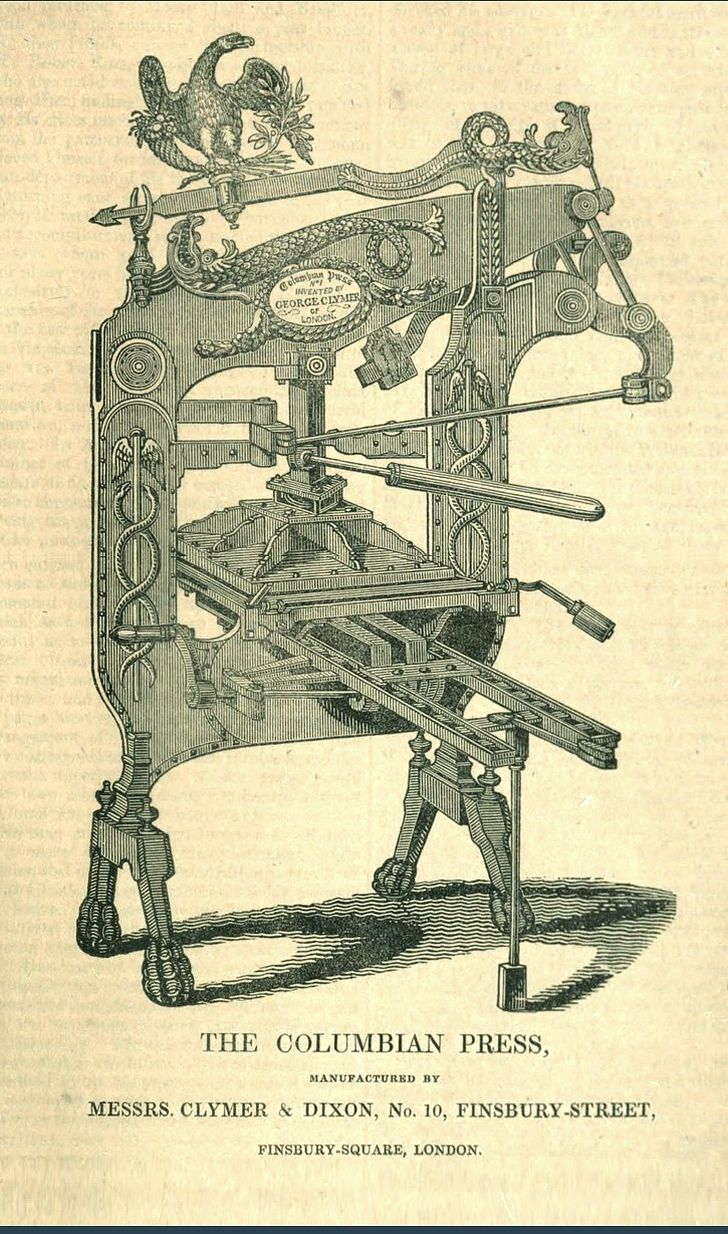
George E. Clymer Columbian printing press advertisement

George E. Clymer (c. 1754–1834), printing press inventor and manufacturer, from Philadelphia, Pennsylvania, was an American engineer and all around inventor. Clymer, in his earlier vocational years, was something of a civil engineer and as an inventor became noted for his improvements and developments in early nineteenth century printing presses, and ultimately developed his own distinctive printing press, which soon became widely known as the Columbian Printing Press, which were often favorably received by printers in America, England and parts of Europe. After relocating to England because of better market conditions, Clymer subsequently became one of the principal developers and suppliers of printing presses in Europe in the early nineteenth century. The innovative designs he incorporated into his printing presses were put to use in the manufacturing of other printing presses years after his death.

== Early life and family ==
Clymer was born and raised on his father's large farm in Bucks County, Pennsylvania, on the northern border of Philadelphia. His family was from Switzerland, and they arrived in the British-American colonies in the early 1700s. He received his basic education from the local schools, during which time he also bust helping his father with the daily chores of farm life where he proved to be skillful at repairing, improving and modifying farm equipment. In one instance Clymer demonstrated his mechanical skill when he created a unique plough, greatly superior to conventional ploughs, that was more suitable for tilling the difficult soils in that part of the state, attracting the attention of various inventors of that time. At age sixteen he learned the trade of carpentry and continued in this capacity for twenty-five years in his home neighborhood, applying his skills and industry in many ways. Printing historian Charles Henry Timperley reports that Clymer was a rather tall individual who bore a "manly and dignified countenance". He married Margaret Backhouse, the daughter of Judge Richard Backhouse of the Durham Iron Works in Pennsylvania. Clymer's marriage produced several children. By 1797, Clymer continued to put his mechanical skill to use and began making improvements on conventional wooden printing presses.

== Inventor ==
Clymer moved to Philadelphia around 1800, where the construction of the first permanent bridge to span the Schuylkill River, where it passed through Philadelphia, was in progress. While the construction of the piers was underway he became interested in hydraulics and developed a special purpose pump, for which he became widely noted, capable of discharging 500 hundred gallons of water a minute, and also capable of dredging and removing sand and gravel at the same time. Thoroughly tested in the field, Clymer's pump proved to be far more efficient than any other pumps in the area at that time, and he received a U.S. patent on December 22, 1801, for the pump. He eventually introduced his pump in Great Britain where he also received a patent.

Soon after he became interested in printing press operations and produced his own wooden printing presses, while making adding significant improvements to their design and function. By 1805, he was listed in a city directory as a printing press maker. Clymer, along with a number of his contemporaries in Philadelphia, continued making minor improvements to existing wooden printing presses. He was one of the first to significantly improve upon the centuries-old design of the common press that were in use before and during the 1700s. He made changes in the method of cutting the large iron screw, mounting the platen differently, and employing rollers instead of sliding cramp irons for moving the platen into place. Soon he made the iron hand-press that shared some of its design principles with the press made by English inventor Earl of Stanhope. However, there were only two Stanhope presses in America at the time, and there is no evidence that Clymer ever saw the actual machine. Historians estimate that before 1800 Clymer initially began making wooden presses of the type that was commonly used in the eighteenth century and may have introduced his own improvements and modifications to the conventional design.

By 1813, after sixteen years of persistent effort, Clymer invented his own press, which he called the Columbian Printing Press, which soon pushed the Stanhope press out of the market in Europe. One of the most useful features of his printing press was the employment of a series of power-multiplying compound levers, making the effort of the pressing operation much easier, as it did not require near as much exertion from the printer to effect the pressing action. Clymer's printing press was considered the first significant American invention in the printing industry in both American and England. His press included a lever-operated press and platen, and in little time proved to be the greatest improvement in printing presses over the wooden hand-printing presses of the 1700s ever attained at any one time. Before this, wooden presses, which had previously been employed in Europe since the fifteenth century, and also used in the American colonies since the 1600s, including those made by Adam Ramage, were commonly used. Clymer, taking advantage of current developments in iron-casting techniques, constructed his press out of cast-iron, with elaborate ornamentation about the structure which distinguished it from all other printing presses. The ornamentation consisted of a cast-iron character of Hermes on each pillar, alligators and other reptiles on the levers, and, above the structure featured an American spread eagle, which also functioned as a counterweight which lifted the platen after printing. Clymer's exceptional printing presses were unique in their design and ease of operation and were naturally desired by many American printers, however, most could not afford his asking price of $400, so in 1817 Clymer took his press to England, where it was immediately well received, while competing in the European market with the Stanhope press, and later with the Albion press. The Columbian press remained popular for many years, with Clymer receiving a gold medal from the King of the Netherlands for its design, and following the introduction of his press in Russia he also received a present from Alexander I, the Czar of Russia.

Clymer's Columbian Press was inspired in part by the earlier English Stanhope press. Because most of the printers in America were not as yet established and could not afford Clymer's more expensive printing press he found a limited market for it in the United States. In 1830 he took on Samuel Dixon as a business partner, and they subsequently relocated their company to 10 Finsbury Street in Philadelphia and did business under the name of Clymer and Dixon. His first printing presses made in England had his own name, but by 1825 the company and printing presses displayed both names. After 1813, Clymer, along with Ramage, became major sources for the needs of the early American printer.

== Final years and legacy ==
Clymer made a success of his press-manufacturing business, and spent the rest of his life in England. Although he had made and sold several dozen presses in Philadelphia, there are no surviving American Columbian printing presses. Though they were not exactly the same in design, the Leggett 'Queen' press, made in Ipswich, and the Britannia press, made in Leeds were designed after Clymer's Columbian press. The Albion press was also designed as a way of upstaging Clymer's elaborately designed and prestigious press; though the Albion was initially less decorative, an ornate casting of the English royal arms was eventually added as a counterweight, paralleling the iconic and stately spread-eagle counterweight on the Columbian.

While in London Clymer manufactured his printing presses in sizes between what was referred to as "Super Royal" and "Double Royal". They sold for £100, and £125 respectively, with variant press sizes and prices in between. In 1820 England saw a depression which adversely effected business sales and subsequently Clymer was compelled to make significant reductions in his asking prices, ranging from £75 to £85.

In 1819 the image of Clymer's printing press was used by the Columbia Typographical Society in Washington D.C., a local union of journeyman printers, as the emblem for their organization, as it represented their republican sentiments in the political realm while also serving as a symbol of national pride in the American printing trade.

A rare early press, currently located at Historic Richmond Town, has been tentatively attributed by historians as the only known press made by Clymer prior to his 1813 design for the Columbian Press.

During the 1800s Clymer's presses were commonly employed in European printing offices. Today they are often found in various European museums.

Clymer died in London in 1834 at the age of eighty. Out of several children he was survived by three daughters. After his death the Columbian Press continued to be sold by the firm he had established, and it was also made by other manufacturers in the United Kingdom and elsewhere in Europe up until 1913.

== Examples ==
Surviving examples of the Columbian Press can be found in many museums around the world:

- Blists Hill Victorian Town, Ironbridge Gorge Museum Trust, England
- William Clowes Ltd. Printing Museum, Beccles, Suffolk, England
- Werkstattmuseum für Druckkunst (Workshop Museum for the Art of Printing), Leipzig, Germany
- Milton Keynes Museum Printshop, England
- Amberley Working Museum, Amberley, West Sussex, England
- Cambridge Museum of Technology, Cambridge, England
- National Print Museum of Ireland
- Foyer of The Sydney Morning Herald, Sydney, Australia
- The Eagle Press at Crich Tramway Village, Crich, Matlock, Derbyshire, England
- Ulster Folk and Transport Museum, Northern Ireland
- BIP Printing Workshop, Brighton, UK
- Ziegenbalg Museum, Tharangambadi, India
- Budapest History Museum - Kiscell Museum, Budapest, Hungary
- Budapest History Museum - Castle Museum, Budapest, Hungary

== See also ==
- Ruthven Printing Press
- Early American publishers and printers

== Bibliography ==
- Mitman, Carl W. (1943). "Clymer, George E.". In Johnson, Allen; Malone, Dumas (eds.). Dictionary of American biography. Vol. IV. New York: Charles Scribner's Sons.
- Moore, John Weeks (1886). Moore's Historical, Biographical, and Miscellaneous Gatherings. Concord, New Hampshire: Republican Press Association.
- Moran, James C. (April 1971). "The Development of the Printing Press". Journal of the Royal Society of Arts. 119 (5177). The Royal Society for the Encouragement of Arts, Manufactures and Commerce: 281–293. JSTOR 41370709.
- Moran, James C. (1973). Printing Presses. London: Faber and Faber. ISBN 978-0-520-02904-0.
- Oldham, Robert W.; Goossens, Patrick (2014). "The Columbian Hand Press at 200 - An Historical Summary and World-wide Census". Journal of the Printing Historical Society. 21. Ad Lib Press.
- Saxe, Stephen O. (1992). American iron hand presses. New Castle, Delaware: Oak Knoll Books. ISBN 978-0-938-76836-4.
- Southward, John (1900). Practical Printing: A Handbook of the Art of Typography. Vol. I. London: "Printers' Register" Office.
- Timperley, Charles Henry (1842). Encyclopaedia of Literary and Typographical Anecdote. London: Henry George Bohn.
- Wroth, Lawrence C. (1938). The Colonial Printer. Portland, Maine: The Southworth-Anthoensen Press.

Online sources

- "Columbian Press". Smithsonian National Museum of American History.
- "Online Collections Database". Historic Richmond Town. Staten Island Historical Society.
