= Adam Ramage =

American printing press manufacturer and inventor

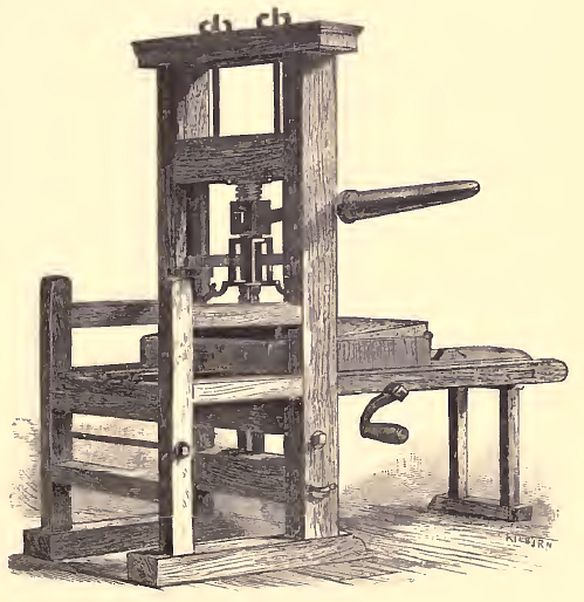
Ramage Printing Press (See also other variation.)

Adam Ramage (1771/72 – July 9, 1850) was an American printing press manufacturer and the originator of Ramage printing press, a "one-pull" printing press. He is noted for being one of the most important printing press makers and innovators of his day, and the primary press-builder in the United States during the beginning of the 19th century. Ramage was one of the first press makers to incorporate an iron printing bed into the apparatus. The advent of printing was the primary way information was passed on from town to town, colony to colony, state to state, and functioned as a news network during its early years.

== Early life ==
Born at Harlawmuir near Carlops in Scotland, Ramage, originally a cabinet maker by trade, emigrated to Philadelphia in the United States in June 1795, one among many printers from Scotland who established themselves in Philadelphia, the foremost city in America for printing and publishing at that time. Ramage was a great admirer of the renowned Scottish poet, Robert Burns and his poetry.

== Career ==
Adam Ramage, along with the inventor George E. Clymer, were considered the two most important American press makers of their era. Ramage manufactured 1,250 wooden presses during his lifetime. Before producing his own printing presses Ramage repaired printing presses in Philadelphia. Within ten years, he was producing his own printing presses incorporating enhancements to existing press designs, using various metal components such as an iron platen bed fitted into the design structure of the common presses then in use. In 1817, Ramage imported a Ruthven printing press and the following year he made improvements to it and filed a patent; by re-designing the screw mechanism that lowered the print to the platen, he made the process much quicker and much easier. One of his most significant modifications was the design of his "one-pull" mechanism, which incorporated a finer threaded press screw with a larger diameter, which using the same amount of human force, yielded more pressure upon the printing platen. Ramage was one of the first to construct iron beds. The earliest date the Ramage press was employed in the United States is difficult to determine. This improved pressing mechanism did not come into use until just after the colonial independence. Ramage conducted his press making business at his factory, on Library Street, Philadelphia, up to the time of his death, and has supplied the greater number of the "one-pull" printing presses that were in operation in the United States during that period.

On page 3 of the August 25, 1817, issue of The Evening Post, Ramage wrote a commentary about his printing press and how it was received by various printers at that time.

Ramage also manufactured bookbinding and paper-cutting presses, and a table press, built with an iron frame, and which employed a screw-device, iron platen and bed. He referred to it as his printing, copying and seal press.

== Final days and legacy ==
Adam Ramage died on July 9, 1850, at his residence on Lombard Street in Philadelphia after a brief illness, compounded by other ailments, at the age of 79.

About eighteen Ramage presses with several different platen sizes still exist and are kept in various locations across the United States. A very rare wooden Ramage press built in 1806 is housed at the International Printing Museum in Carson, California. The wooden presses manufactured by Ramage were often preferred by upstart printers and masters alike, and taken westward to the American "frontier", because they were not as heavy and cumbersome as the iron presses made by Clymer. The first printing presses in New Mexico, California, and Utah in the first half of the 19th century were Ramage presses, transported in wagons over the Santa Fe Trail and by ship. Ramage continued to build his wooden presses for nearly 50 years, even after iron hand presses like the Stanhope became popular in Europe, because the wooden presses were a lighter, more affordable, and more practical option for small town printers in America.

== See also ==
- Early American publishers and printers
- List of early American publishers and printers
- Columbian press

== Bibliography ==
- Brown, H. Glenn (1943). "Philadelphia Contributions to the Book Arts and Book Trade, 1796-1810". The Papers of the Bibliographical Society of America. 37 (4). The University of Chicago Press: 275–292. doi:10.1086/pbsa.37.4.24293458. JSTOR 24293458. S2CID 163898612.
- Hamilton, Adam (1942). Adam Ramage and His Presses. Southworth-Anthoensen Press.
- Moran, James (1973). Printing presses: history and development from the fifteenth century to modern times. London, Faber. ISBN 978-0-5200-2904-0.
- Ringwalt, J. Luther Ed (1871). American Encyclopedia Of Printing. Menamin & Ringwalt.
- Thomas, Isaiah (1874). The history of printing in America, with a biography of printers. Vol. I. New York: B. Franklin.
- Wroth, Lawrence C. (1938). The Colonial Printer. Portland, Me., The Southworth-Anthoensen press.
- "1806 Ramage press". International Printing Museum.
- "Adam Ramage and his One-pull Common Press". American Printing History Association. April 27, 2017.
- "Death of an Inventor". Scientific American. 5 (44). Scientific American, a division of Nature America, Inc.: 346 July 20, 1850. doi:10.1038/scientificamerican07201850-346a. JSTOR 24933301.
- Ramage, Adam (August 25, 1817). "The Screw Printing Press". The Evening Post. New York, New York. Archived from the original on December 19, 2022.
