= Hugh Gaine =

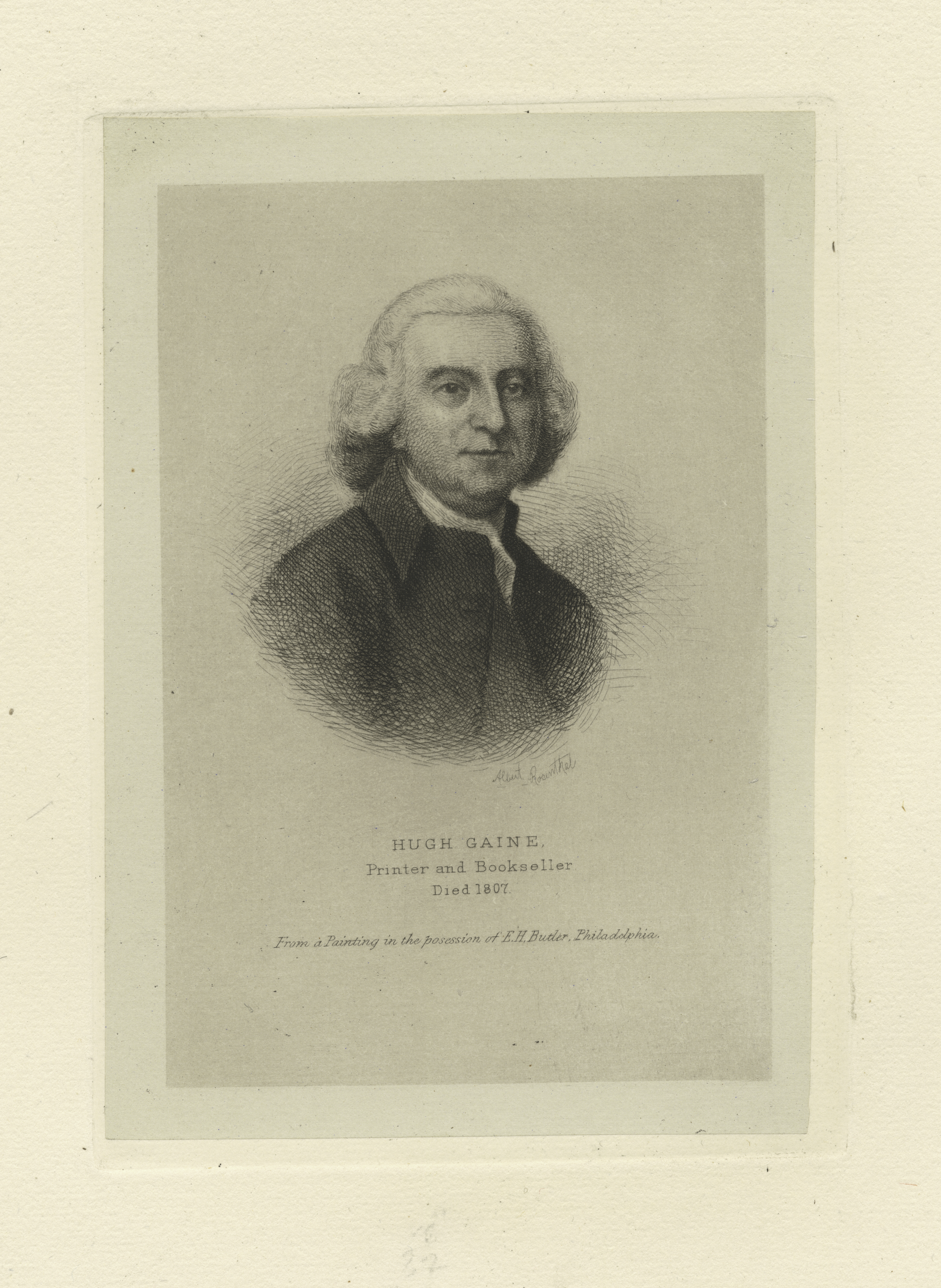
- Born: c. 1726; County Antrim, Ireland
- Died: April 27, 1807 (aged 80–81); New York County, New York, U.S.
- Occupations: Printer and Publisher
- Known for: Founder of The New York Mercury and the New York Royal Gazette

Hugh Gaine (c. 1726 – April 27, 1807) was an 18th-century early American printer, newspaper publisher and bookseller. He founded and was printer of The New York Mercury and the New York Royal Gazette. As a printer and journalist Gaine remained neutral when the idea of American independence was at issue, which became a source of trouble for him at times. Subsequently figures like Philip Freneau, a Revolutionary poet, had very little affection for Gaine, while some historians question his loyalties. During his time in New York City Gaine's printing business became the most prolific, lasting more than forty years.

== Early life ==
Gaine was born in Belfast, Ireland, about 1726 and came to the British colonies at New York in 1745. Gaine came from a working-class family in Ireland, and entered into a five-year apprenticeship with James Macgee in Belfast before emigrating at the age of eighteen to New York City in 1745. He became a journeyman and worked for six years under James Parker, who was the official printer for the city of New York, before becoming proficient enough and publishing his own newspaper. Gaine purchased a modest property in Hanover square, and used his house as book and stationery store, while he increased his printing, where his business ventures soon became extensive and successful. He remained at this location for forty years printing pamphlets and other works for himself and others.

== Printing career ==
Gaine first entered into business as a printer and bookseller in New York city in 1750, and on August 3, 1752 established the New York Mercury, a weekly newspaper. In 1767, Gaine modified the name and added Gazette to his newspaper, now referred to as Gaine's New York Gazette and Mercury from that point on. He also functioned as a pressman, compositor, folder, and distributor of his own newspaper, which had a circulation of upwards to four hundred copies. Gaine sought out and recorded newsworthy events on his own accord. He also set up his own printing types, operated the printing press, and folded his own newspapers before delivering them to his subscribers.

When the Stamp Act of 1765, with its proposed taxation of newspapers, legal documents and the like, was about to become law, Gaine, like many other American printers, suspended the publication of his newspaper in protest.

For his printing of both patriot and loyalist articles, the Sons of Liberty stormed Gaine's printing shop and threatened to destroy it in November 1775, which Gaine resented as his editorship was of a neutral nature in regards to American independence. They had advertised that their printing shop "has been open to publication from ALL PARTIES". When the British moved on New York City early in the American Revolutionary War, he crossed the river to Newark, New Jersey, and published a lukewarm pro-independence newspaper. After deciding the British were going to win the war after routing Washington's army from Brooklyn, he returned to New York and began publishing accounts highly favorable to the British. Accordingly he chose for his sign in the heading of the Mercury the Bible and Crown. Gaine's apparent split loyalties continued to be received less than favorably while he was in New York. Revolutionary poet Philip Freneau took exception to this and in particular over Gaine's use of the Bible and Crown in the heading of his newspaper, leading Freneau to publish a polemic about Gaine in his Freeman's Journal.

During the American Revolution era, Gaine also ran a bookshop together with Samuel Loudon in New York City. Though Gaine's newspaper ventures were a failure (he exited the field by 1783), he did do well in book publishing.

When the Revolutionary war ended Gaine submitted a petition to remain in New York City, which was granted, but soon after he was compelled to hand over the publication of his failed newspaper, and confine his business ventures to private printing and bookselling, which he did do well at.

== Final years and legacy ==
Gaine started out in life as a poor man, but was said to be punctual in his business dealings, and "of correct moral habits, and respectable as a citizen", and became the founder of two New York newspapers. Gaine's printing business became the most successful in New York during its existence. Gaine died on April 25, 1807, at the age of eighty-one. Because of Gaine's wavering loyalties during the uncertainty of the American Revolution, however, colonial American historian Isaiah Thomas said that "Gaine's political creed, it seems, was to join the strongest party" at any given time, while modern day historian Anthony Fellows referred to Gaine as the "Turncoat editor". After a printing career that lasted more than forty years Gaine retired a fairly wealthy man with a handsome estate.

== See also ==
- Early American publishers and printers
- Bibliography of early American publishers and printers
- List of early American publishers and printers

== Bibliography ==
- Chopra, Ruma (Fall 2009). "Printer Hugh Gaine Crosses and Re-Crosses the Hudson". New York History. 90 (4). Cornell University Press: 271–285. JSTOR 23185129.
- Wilson, John Grant; Fiske, John, eds. (1900). Appletons' Cyclopaedia of American Biography. Vol. II. New York, D. Appleton.
- Fellow, Anthony R. (2005). American media history. Southbank, Victoria, Australia; [Belmont, CA] : Thomson/Wadsworth. ISBN 978-1-1113-48120.
- Gaine, Hugh (1902). Ford, Paul Leicester (ed.). Journals of Hugh Gaine : printer. Vol. I. New York : Dodd, Mead & Co.
- Gaine, Hugh (1902). Ford, Paul Leicester (ed.). Journals of Hugh Gaine : printer. Vol. II. New York : Dodd, Mead & Co.
- Hildeburn, Charles S. (1895). Sketches of printers and printing in colonial New York. New York : Dodd, Mead, & Company.
- Hudson, Frederic (1873). Journalism in the United States, from 1690 to 1872. New York, Harper & Brothers.
- Sonneman J. H. The ties that bind: A re-examination of the career of Hugh Gaine, printer and bookseller, at the Bible and Crown, in Hanover square. Master of Arts Thesis. University of Maryland, College Park; 2021.
- Thomas, Isaiah (1874). The history of printing in America, with a biography of printers. Vol. I. New York, B. Franklin.
- —— (1874). The history of printing in America, with a biography of printers. Vol. II. New York, B. Franklin.
