= Paper & Printing Trades Journal =

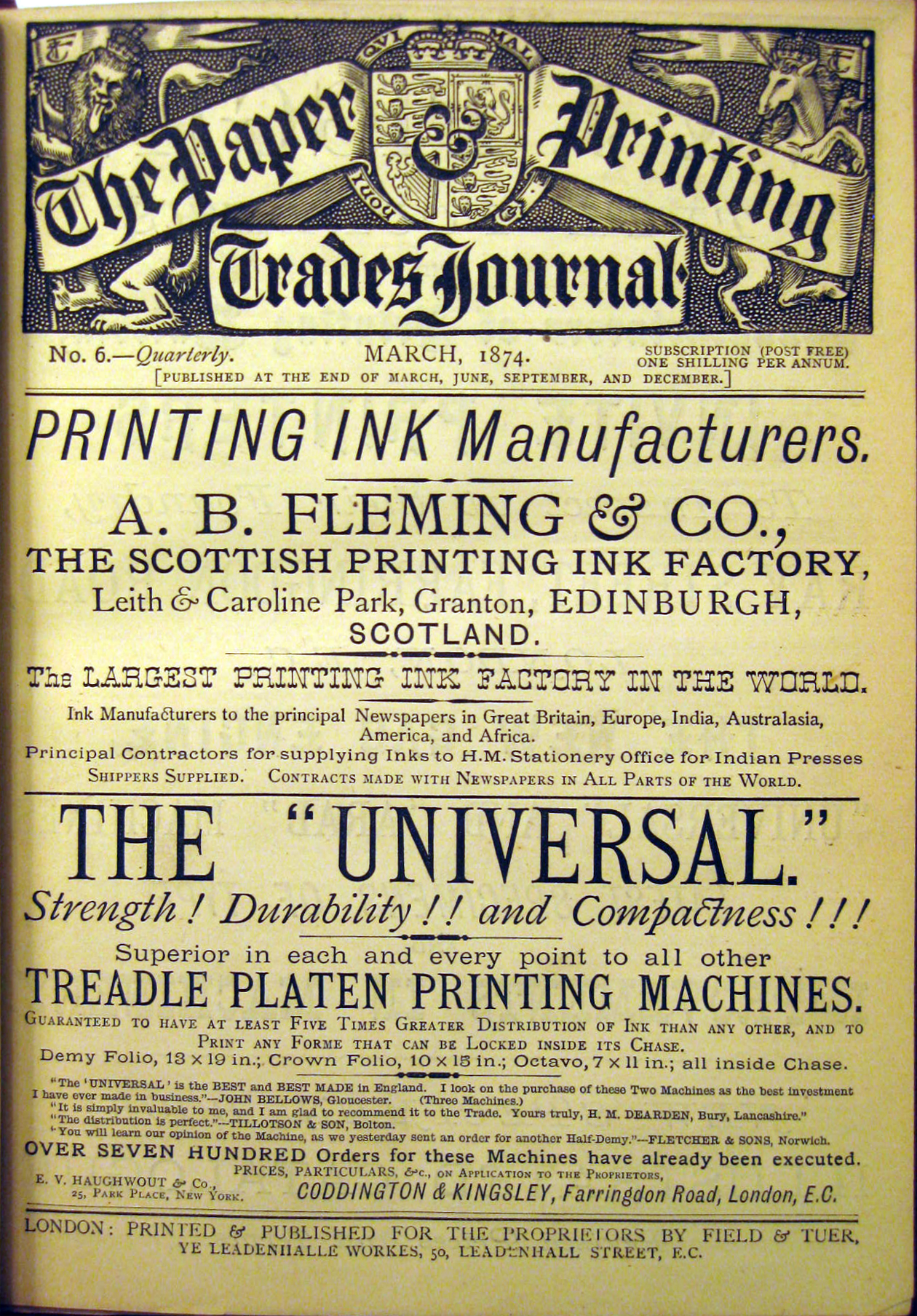
- Discipline: Printing; Publishing
- Language: English
- Edited by: Andrew White Tuer

Publication details
- History: 1872–1896
- Publisher: Field & Tuer (Great Britain)
- Frequency: Quarterly

Standard abbreviations
- ISO 4: Pap. Print. Trades J.

Indexing
- OCLC no.: 49554303

The Paper & Printing Trades Journal was one of the first trade publications for the printing and publishing industries. Launched in 1872 by the London firm of Field & Tuer under the imprint Ye Leadenhalle Workes (later the Leadenhall Press), it was founded and edited for many years by Andrew White Tuer and his assistant Robert Hilton. The introduction to the first issue described the quarterly as "A Medium of Intercommunication Between Stationers, Printers, Publishers and Booksellers and the Manufacturers". Initially distributed gratis, in 1874 a charge of one shilling was imposed for four issues. Content consisted of advertising, news, reviews, articles about new products and machinery, printers jokes (in the form of a column titled "Quads"), and commentary by Tuer and Hilton on printing samples sent in for a "Specimens" feature begun in 1874. That column eventually led to an ambitious annual, the Printers' International Specimen Exchange, introduced by Field & Tuer in 1880. The journal was sold in 1891 to John Southward, author of works on printing and typography. The magazine was owned by him until 1893. The magazine folded in 1896.
