= Ruthven printing press =

19th century printing press

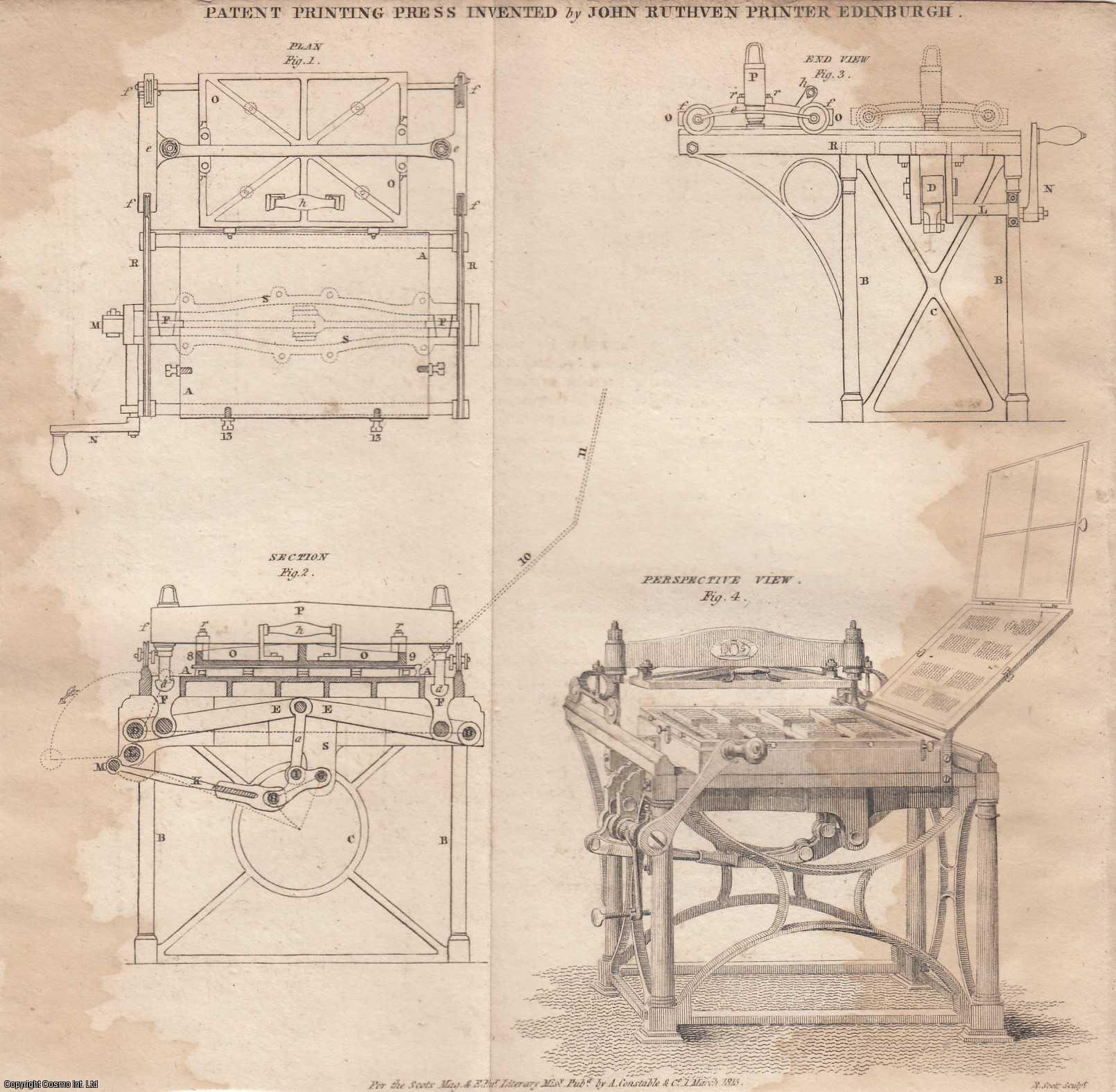
Ruthven printing press Schematic drawing for patent

The Ruthven printing press was invented and manufactured by John Ruthven of Edinburgh, Scotland, from 1819 to 1822. The Ruthven press was an iron bed press which functioned by means of an unconventional platen which rolled over a stationary table which held the type, where the pressure on the type faces was exerted from below, instead of in the conventional method where pressure was applied from above. The platen is supported by two iron springs, under which are four brass bevelled wheels which move along on two tracks made of bevelled steel. After the impression is made the springs give way, and consequently rise up. The press overall incorporated a number of other rather complex mechanical components, the details of which are beyond the scope of this article. The press was smaller in size than most presses of this period, easier to use, and subsequently it quickly established a favorable reputation for itself among English printers.

The Ruthven printing press was put to use printing and establishing a number of newspapers in its day. The first newspaper in Western Australia, The Fremantle Observer, Perth Gazette and Journal, issued April 5, 1831, was printed on the Ruthven press. As commercial printing ink was not available in Fremantle, an alternative ink was concocted by mixing lamp black soot and mutton fat, and the rollers were treated with a glue and treacle. The press was capable of printing 50 pages of newsprint in about one hour. Thereafter the press was purchased by another group of partners who put it to use print The Western Australian and The Inquisitor, but they never lasted due to political and social differences in publishing between some of the partners. Thereafter the press was taken to Perth where it was employed in the printing of the Swan River Guardian, however, it was repossessed for non-payment. The next owner, E. Stirling, employed it briefly for printing The Western Australian Magazine. Originally manufactured in Scotland, it was brought to Tasmania around 1822 by the Scottish missionary Reverend Archibald Macarthur, who sold it to the colonial authorities in Hobart Town, but it proved to be not large enough for the task they had intended and they subsequently sold the press to a former government printer, who in turn probably sold it to Samuel Dowsett, who printed Launceston's second newspaper, the Cornwall Press, in 1829.

== See also ==
- Adam Ramage, printing press manufacturer in the early 1800s
- George E. Clymer, printing press manufacturer in the early 1800s
- Early American publishers and printers

== Sources ==
- Johnson, John (1824). Typographia, or the Printers' instructor: : including an account of the origin of printing. London : Published by Messrs. Longman, Hurst, Rees, Orme, Brown & Green...
- Moran, James (1973). Printing presses: history and development from the fifteenth century to modern times. London, Faber. ISBN 978-0-5200-2904-0.
- "Ruthven Printing Press". Western Australia Museum.
- Newman, Jeremy. "John Ruthven Invents the Ruthven Press". HistoryofInformation.com.
