= Printers' International Specimen Exchange =

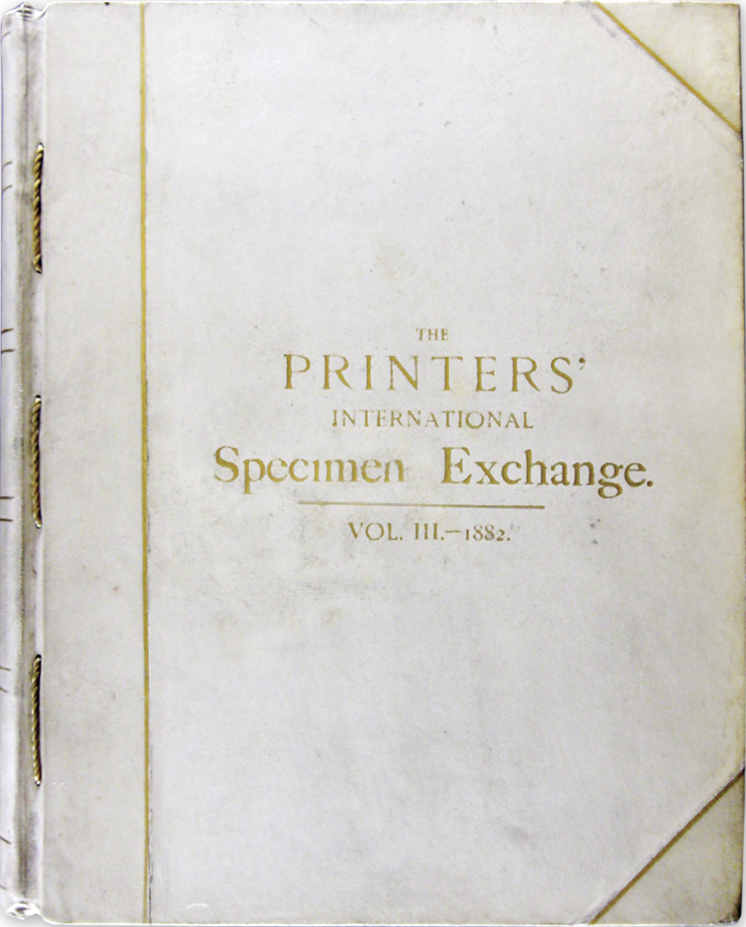
- Cover of Vol. III

The Printers' International Specimen Exchange was an influential annual subscription publication for the "technical education of the working printer" that ran from 1880 to 1898. Conceived around the time of the Caxton Celebration of 1877, it was an ambitious expansion of a "Specimens" column then appearing in the Paper & Printing Trades Journal, a widely read trade publication issued by London printers and publishers Field & Tuer and edited by Andrew White Tuer.

The official proposal was made in a letter written in 1879 by Thomas Hailing of the Oxford Printing Works, Cheltenham, to Tuer, who replied that if 100 printers would participate, his firm would handle the arrangements. Printers, and their employees and apprentices, were invited to send in examples of their work in the number of anticipated subscribers for each year. In return, they received a bound, collated set of all specimens accepted. The cost was one shilling (three shillings for American subscribers). For an additional cost, the finished volume was bound in half vellum laced with catgut.

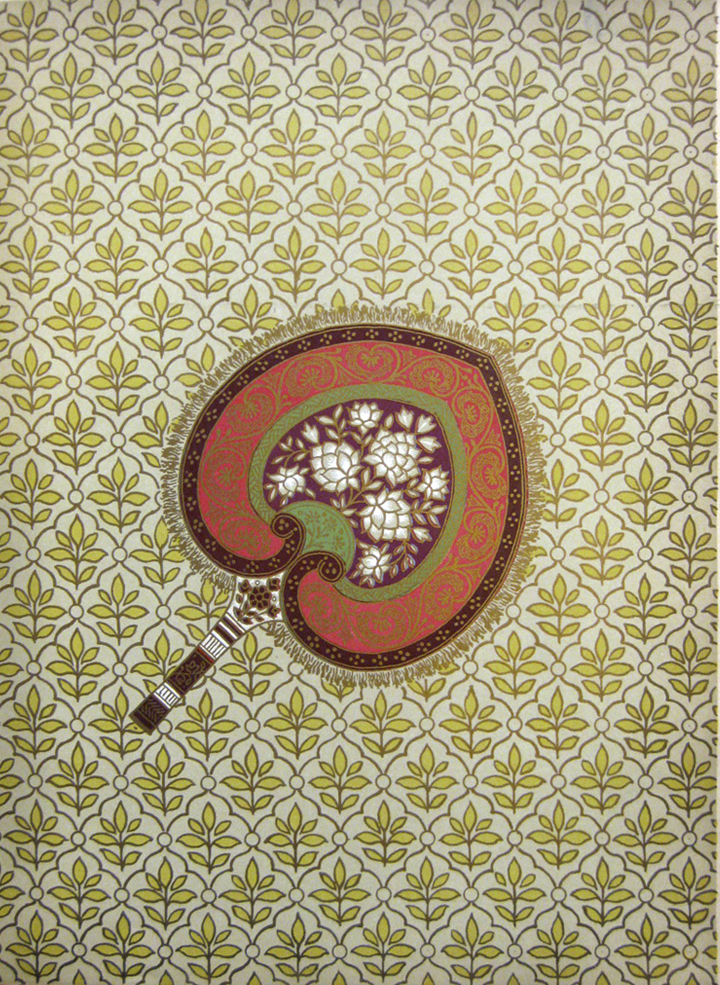
Contribution by T. L. De Vinne to Volume VII (1886)

Response to the call for specimens for the first issue exceeded all expectations, and publication, originally announced as biannual, was quickly changed to annual. John Ruskin praised the goals of the project in a letter quoted in the introduction to the first volume, and a copy of Volume VI was accepted by Queen Victoria.

Initially most of the contributions came from Great Britain and the United States, but by the mid-1880s the Exchange included as many as 400 specimens from around the world. For the first three years, Tuer and his editorial assistant, Robert Hilton, commented frankly and often amusingly on each specimen, but with the increase in both number and international participation, detailed critiques became burdensome and, perhaps, politically sensitive. Volumes I–VIII (1880–1887) were published by Field & Tuer at the Leadenhall Press, London, and the content represented both old-style and new "Artistic" printing.

After Volume VIII, Tuer turned publication over to Hilton, who had moved on to become editor of a new journal, the British Printer, published by the firm of Raithby & Lawrence. The Exchange began to decline under Hilton's editorship, leaning heavily toward the new "Leicester Free Style" of typography developed by the firm's foreman Robert Grayson, and the venture ended a few years after Raithby & Lawrence sued Hilton for violating an agreement not to start a competing publication. The last two (much slimmer) volumes each covered two years, with the final one not issued until early 1898, containing only 123 specimens.

At its best, the Printers' International Specimen Exchange taught a generation of printers how to examine learn from printed work, and it inspired similar ventures in Germany, France, and the United States.

== Works cited ==
- "Andrew W. Tuer". British Printer, Vol. IV, No. 34, July–August, 1893: 225–226.
- Anon. [Roy Brewer]. 1776-1876 Raithby Lawrence 1876-1976, Raithby, Lawrence & Co., Ltd., 1976.
- Graham Hudson: The Design and Printing of Ephemera in Britain and America 1720-1920, British Library and Oak Knoll Press, 2008.
- Jennett, Sean. "Printers' International Specimen Exchange", Print IX: 4, March–April, 1955: 17–18.
- Johnson, A. F. "Old-Face Types in the Victorian Age", Monotype Recorder, Sept.-Dec. 1931: 5–14.
- Johnston, Alastair. Alphabets to Order: The Literature of Nineteenth Century Typefounders' Specimens. New Castle (DE): Oak Knoll Press, 2000.
- Peltz, Lucy. "Tuer, Andrew White (1838–1900)." Oxford Dictionary of National Biography. Oxford: Oxford University Press, 2004. (Also: Dodgson, Campbell (1901). "Tuer, Andrew White" . In Lee, Sidney (ed.). Dictionary of National Biography (1st supplement). London: Smith, Elder & Co. )
- Printers' International Specimen Exchange, Volumes I-XVI. London: Office of the Paper & Printing Trades Journal, Field & Tuer, the Leadenhall Press (1880–1887); Office of the British Printer, Raithby & Lawrence (1888–1898).
- Young, Matthew McLennan. The Rise and Fall of the Printers' International Specimen Exchange, Oak Knoll Press, 2012.
- Young, Matthew McLennan. Field & Tuer, the Leadenhall Press. A Checklist with an Appreciation of Andrew White Tuer, Oak Knoll Press and the British Library, 2010.
