= John Southward =

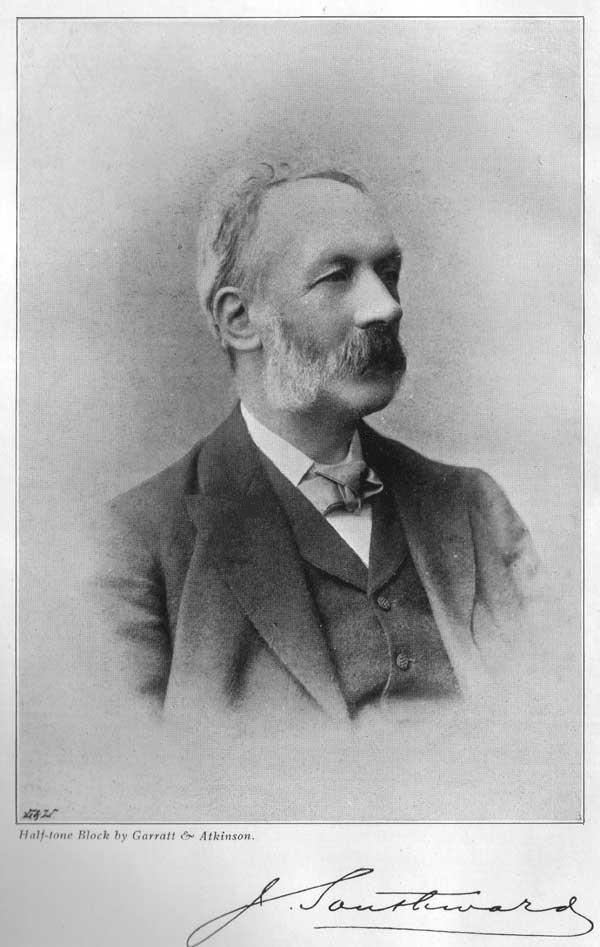
John Southward

John Southward (1840–1902) was an English writer on printing and typography,

== Life ==
Born on 28 April 1840, he was son of Jackson Southward, a printer in Liverpool from Corney, Cumberland, by Margaret Proud of Enniscorthy, County Wexford. After education at the Liverpool Collegiate Institution, he gained practical knowledge of printing in his father's office on Pitt Street, Liverpool. At 17 he began editorial work with the Rev. Abraham Hume on the Liverpool Philosophical Magazine; and from November 1857 to 1865, when it folded, he ran the Liverpool Observer, the first local penny weekly, which was printed by Jackson Southward. On the failure of the paper John Southward went to London, and was reader for Cox & Wyman (until 1868) and then for Eyre & Spottiswoode.

Southward was interested in philanthropic work, and in 1888 founded and edited for a short time a monthly paper called Charity. During his later years he resided at Streatham. He died in St. Thomas's Hospital, Westminster, after an operation, on 9 July 1902, and was buried in Norwood cemetery.

== Works ==
In 1868 Southward travelled in Spain for a firm of English watchmakers, crossing the country, visiting newspaper offices, and collecting copies of serial publications. He wrote up his experiences in four articles in the Printers' Register in 1869. Further contributions followed, and from February 1886 till June 1890 he edited the paper. He also contributed to other trade organs, and in 1891 took over from Andrew Tuer the Paper and Printing Trades Journal. This publication he left in 1893.

Southward became recognised as an authority on the history and processes of printing. His Dictionary of Typography and its Accessory Arts, first issued as monthly supplements to the Printers' Register, was published in book form in 1872. It was printed simultaneously in the Philadelphia Printers' Circular, and formed the basis of John Luther Ringwalt's American Encyclopædia of Printing. A revised edition appeared in 1875.

Practical Printing: a Handbook of the Art of Typography, a larger work, which also first appeared in the Printers' Register, came out in 1882, and became a standard textbook. Southward prepared revised editions in 1884 and 1887. The fourth and fifth editions (1892 and 1900) were edited by Arthur Powell. Southward's Progress in Printing and the Graphic Arts during the Victorian Era (illustrated) appeared in 1897. Modern Printing, which Southward edited with other experts, in four illustrated sections between 1898 and 1900, was designed to be a reference book for the printing-office and a manual of instruction, and was adopted as a textbook.

Among Southward's other publications were: Authorship and Publication, a technical guide for authors (1881), and Artistic Painting (1892). He contributed the article "Modern Typography" to the ninth edition of the Encyclopædia Britannica, and also wrote technical articles for Chambers's Encyclopædia. The Bibliography of Printing, issued under the names of Edward Clements Bigmore and C. W. H. Wyman (3 vols. 1880-6), was to a large extent his work.

== Family ==
Southward was twice married. His first wife, Rachel Clayton of Huddersfield, by whom he had three sons and four daughters, died in 1892. His second wife, Alice, widow of J. King, whom he married in 1894, survived him.

== Notes ==
Attribution

This article incorporates text from a publication now in the public domain: Lee, Sidney, ed. (1912). "Southward, John". Dictionary of National Biography (2nd supplement). Vol. 3. London: Smith, Elder & Co.
