= Leadenhall Press =

Printer and publisher in London

50 Leadenhall Street
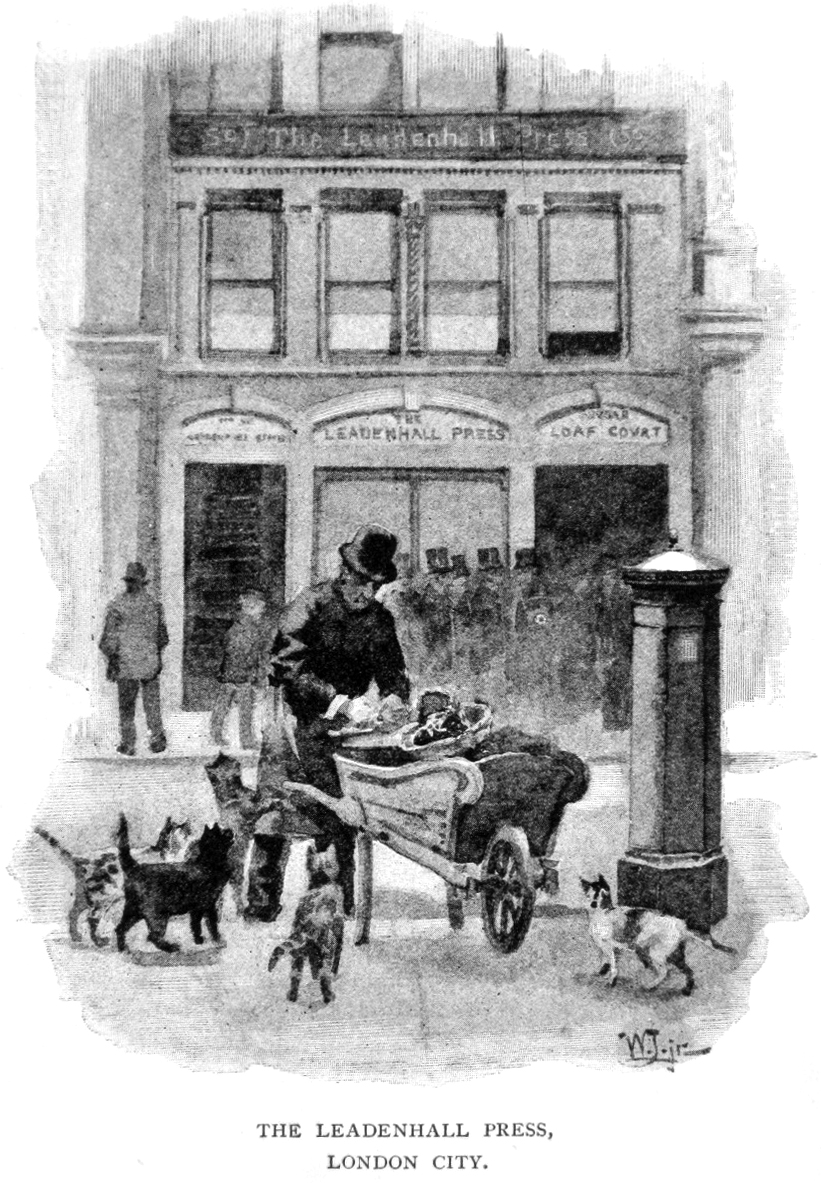
- Illustration by Wm. Luker Jr. for the Leadenhall Press book "London City" (1891)

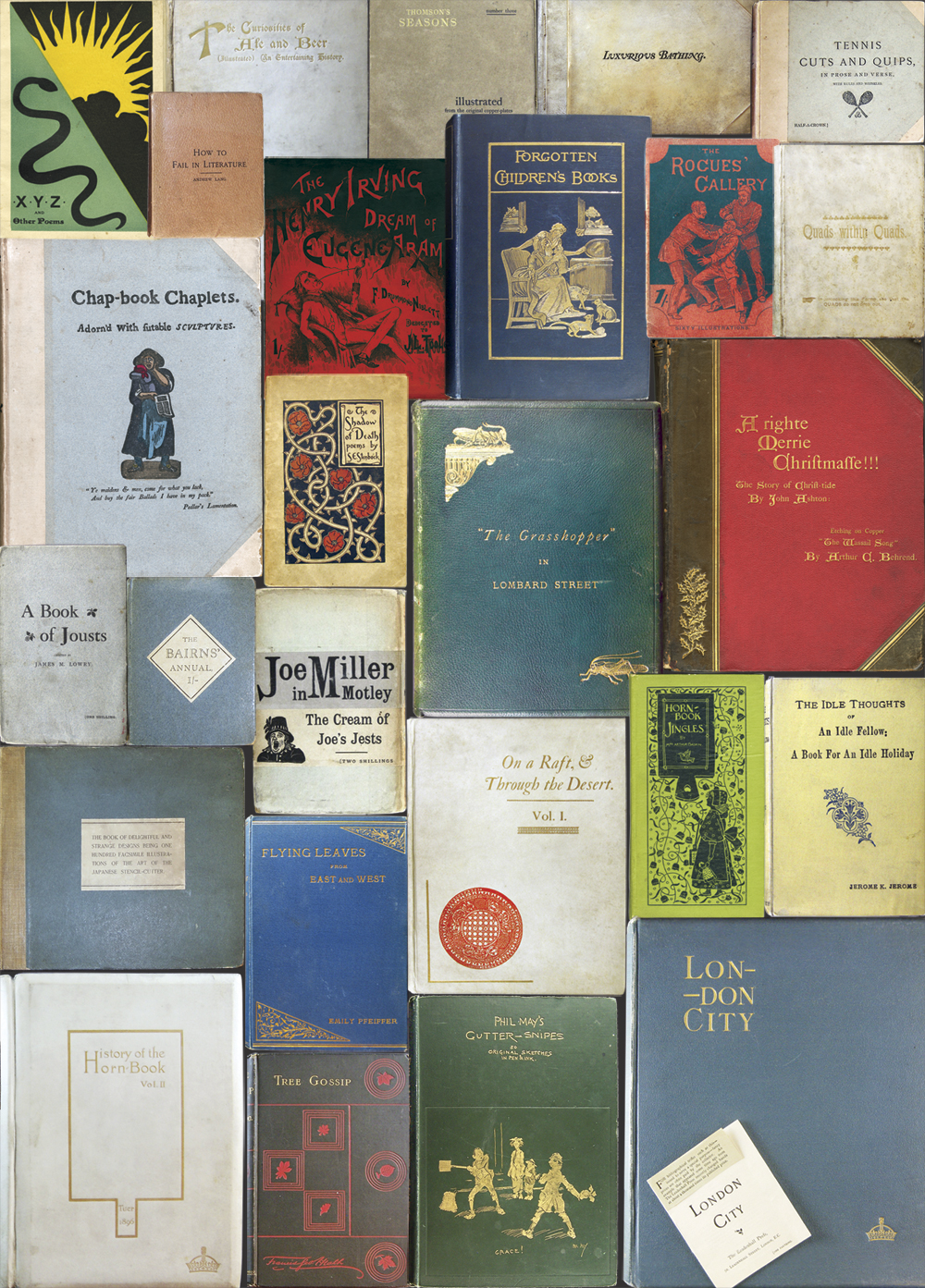
Selected publications of the Leadenhall Press, 1880–90.

The Leadenhall Press was a printer and publisher in London. Founded by Andrew White Tuer (1838–1900), it originated as the publishing arm of the Field & Tuer partnership in London. This development followed their 1868 relocation to 50 Leadenhall Street. Initially founded in 1862, the firm began as job printers, stationers, and manufacturers when Tuer teamed up with Abraham Field (1830–1891), known for producing registers and log books. A significant early achievement was Tuer's invention of Stickphast Paste, a vegetable-based adhesive. It rapidly became a staple in offices, and its production continued under various owners well into the mid-20th century.

Profits from this and other inventions allowed Tuer, to pursue his publishing ambitions. From the beginning, the Leadenhall Press output reflected his imagination, curiosity, and interest in the full range of printing and book production techniques.

The Leadenhall Press imprint first appeared in 1872 in the firm's trade publication, Paper & Printing Trades Journal, as "Ye Leadenhall Workes." Field & Tuer occasionally printed books for other publishers and published sporadically beginning in 1869, but it was not until ten years later that the first official book in the Leadenhall Press catalogue appeared, titled Tuer's own Luxurious Bathing. The following year, Tuer launched the influential Printers' International Specimen Exchange, an annual survey collection of examples printed and submitted by printers and their employees.

Under Tuer's guidance, the Leadenhall Press became an innovative force during the 1880s, issuing as many as 40 books a year: including trade titles for as little as sixpence, as well as limited editions costing several guineas. Although perhaps best known today for children's book reprints, chapbook revivals illustrated by Joseph Crawhall, and several productions of Tuer's own works; the Leadenhall Press catalogue included publications on a wide range of subjects for all tastes. Although the less expensive (and less well made) editions of some titles could be plain and undistinguished, great care was given to the design and printing of many of the series books that were issued only in inexpensive formats.

The Leadenhall Press published many prominent (and also many forgotten) writers and artists of the time. Wilfrid Meynell acted as a literary advisor, writing and editing several books under the pseudonym 'John Oldcastle,’ and the Press published the first books by Jerome K. Jerome. Other authors included Andrew Lang, Egyptologist W. M. Flinders Petrie, Lady Florence Dixie (feminist sister of the infamous Marquess of Queensberry), Max O'Rell, Louis Fagan of the British Museum, J. A. Fuller Maitland, Grant Allen, and Count Eric Stenbock. Oscar Wilde appeared in the poetry collection A Book of Jousts in 1888, and his mother, Lady Jane Wilde contributed to the periodical Bairns' Annual.

The Press quickly earned a reputation for excellence in reproducing art; the first edition of Songs of the North (1885) included works by Burne-Jones, Whistler, and Frederick Sandys, among others. In addition to Joseph Crawhall, other artists who illustrated Leadenhall Press books included Randolph Caldecott, Georgie Gaskin, Tristram Ellis, William Luker Jr., and Punch cartoonists Phil May, Charles Keene and Linley Sambourne.

In 1892, after the retirement and death of Abraham Field, the company was incorporated as The Leadenhall Press, Ltd. Fewer books were published during the 1890s, but the quality remained high, often reflecting Tuer's antiquarian and collecting interests. Publishing operations ceased a few years after Tuer’s death in 1900, when the Press reverted largely to its original job printing and stationery business until 1927, when it was dissolved following the death of Mrs. Tuer. Between 1879 and 1905, the Leadenhall Press issued over 400 titles, not counting several different editions of some books.

== Bibliography ==
- "Andrew W. Tuer". British Printer, Vol. IV, No. 34, July–August, 1893: 225–226.
- "Andrew White Tuer", Printing Review–Magazine of the Printing Industry, Number 54, Summer 1950: 39–40.
- Bury, J. P. T. [John Patrick Tuer]. "A. W. Tuer and the Leadenhall Press". Book Collector, Volume 36, No. 2, Summer 1987: 225–243.
- Johnson, A. F. "Old-Face Types in the Victorian Age", Monotype Recorder, Sept.-Dec. 1931: 5–14.
- Meynell, Francis. English Printed Books. (London: Collins, 1946).
- Peltz, Lucy. "Tuer, Andrew White (1838–1900)." Oxford Dictionary of National Biography. Oxford: Oxford University Press, 2004. (Also: Dodgson, Campbell (1901). "Tuer, Andrew White" . In Lee, Sidney (ed.). Dictionary of National Biography (1st supplement). London: Smith, Elder & Co. )
- White, Gleeson. "Children’s Books and Their Illustrators". International Studio, Special Winter Number, 1897-8: 3–68.
- Young, Matthew McLennan. Field & Tuer, the Leadenhall Press. A Checklist with an Appreciation of Andrew White Tuer. Oak Knoll Press and the British Library, 2010.
