= Robert Parkinson (historian) =

American scholar of early American history

Robert G. Parkinson is a historian of the early United States and American Revolution. He has been a professor at Binghamton University in New York since 2014, and previously taught at Shepherd University. Parkinson graduated from the University of Virginia with a PhD in 2005. Parkinson has published three books: The Common Cause: Creating Race and Nation in the American Revolution (2016), Thirteen Clocks: How Race United the Colonies and Made the Declaration of Independence (2022), and Heart of American Darkness: Bewilderment and Horror on the Early Frontier (2024).
