= Charles Henry Timperley =

English printer and writer (1794–1869)

Charles Henry Timperley (1794–1869) was an English printer and writer.

== Life ==
Timperley was born in Manchester, and educated at the Manchester Grammar School. In March 1810 he enlisted in the 33rd Regiment of Foot, was wounded at the Battle of Waterloo, and was discharged on 28 November 1815. He went back to his apprenticeship to an engraver and copperplate printer, and in 1821 became a letterpress printer by indenture to Messrs. Dicey & Smithson, proprietors of the Northampton Mercury. Around 1829 he had Spencer Timothy Hall as a colleague in the firm.

In April 1828 Timperley gave two lectures on the art of printing to the Warwick and Leamington Literary Institution. He then became foreman to T. Kirk of Nottingham, and editor of the Nottingham Wreath. He married a widow there.

Timperley later managed a bookseller's shop owned by Bancks & Co. of Manchester. The business was undermined by sharp practice and fraud. He accepted a post with Fisher & Jackson, publishers, of London, and remarried after the death of his first wife. His second wife left him to emigrate to Australia, however, and he suffered paralysis and poverty after 1846.

== Works ==
In 1833 he produced Songs of the Press and other Poems relating to the art of Printing, original and selected; also Epitaphs, Epigrams, Anecdotes, Notices of early Printing and Printers, London, and an enlarged edition of the poetical portion appeared in 1845; some of the verse is by Timperley himself. In 1838 he published The Printers' Manual. It was followed by A Dictionary of Printers and Printing, with the Progress of Literature, ancient and modern, Bibliographical Illustrations, London, 1839. The remaindered stock of these two works was purchased by H. G. Bohn, who issued the two together, with some additions, under the title of Encyclopædia of Literary and Typographical Anecdote. Timperley also wrote Annals of Manchester, biographical, historical, ecclesiastical, and commercial, from the earliest period, Manchester, 1839, and helped to edit George Newenham Wright's Gallery of Engravings (from 1845).
