= Andrew White Tuer =

British publisher, writer and printer

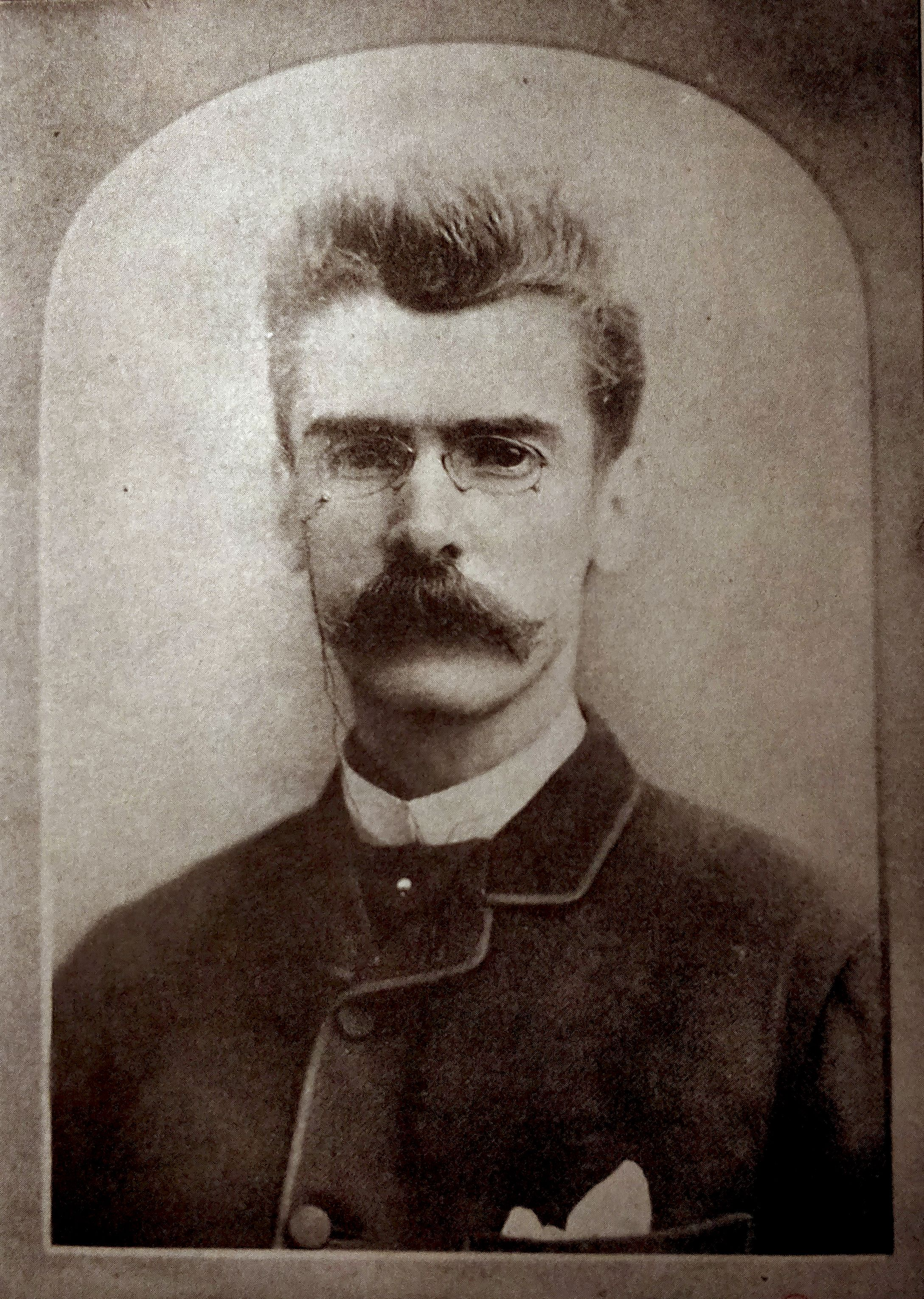
- Born: 25 December 1838; Sunderland, England
- Died: 24 February 1900 (aged 61); London, England
- Resting place: Kensal Green Cemetery, London, England
- Occupations: Publisher, printer, author, typographer, inventor
- Spouse: Louisa Louttit (ca. 1839–1927)

Andrew White Tuer (1838–1900) was a British publisher, writer and printer.

== Life ==
He was born in Sunderland in 1838. Orphaned at an early age, he was raised by his great-uncle, Andrew White, after whom he was named. After his education, he went to London with the plan of becoming a doctor, but that did not suit him, and after working in a merchant's office, he set himself up as a wholesale stationer. In 1862, he joined with Abraham Field, an established producer of ledgers, in the partnership of Field & Tuer. Tuer, the entrepreneur of the pair, invented the highly successful Stickphast Paste, a clean, vegetable-based alternative to the gums and glues then in use. He later introduced the popular Author's Paper Pad, perhaps the first writing block with detachable sheets.

In 1867, Tuer married Thomasine Louisa Louttit, who became well known as an amateur opera singer. The following year, Field & Tuer moved to 50 Leadenhall Street, and the expansion allowed Tuer to pursue his publishing ambitions. In 1872, Tuer introduced the quarterly Paper & Printing Trades Journal, intended as a "Medium of Intercommunication Between Stationers, Printers, Publishers and Booksellers." Tuer later served on the committee of the Caxton Celebration of 1877 commemorating the 400th anniversary of the introduction of printing into England, in charge of Class E: Specimens of Printing.

After that event, Tuer and fellow printer Thomas Hailing began a scheme aimed at improving the quality of the printing trade at all levels. In 1880, after two years of planning, Field & Tuer introduced the Printers' International Specimen Exchange, whereby printers and their employees and apprentices could submit multiple samples of their work and receive back a volume containing a copy of every specimen accepted. Tuer published and edited the Exchange for the first eight years.

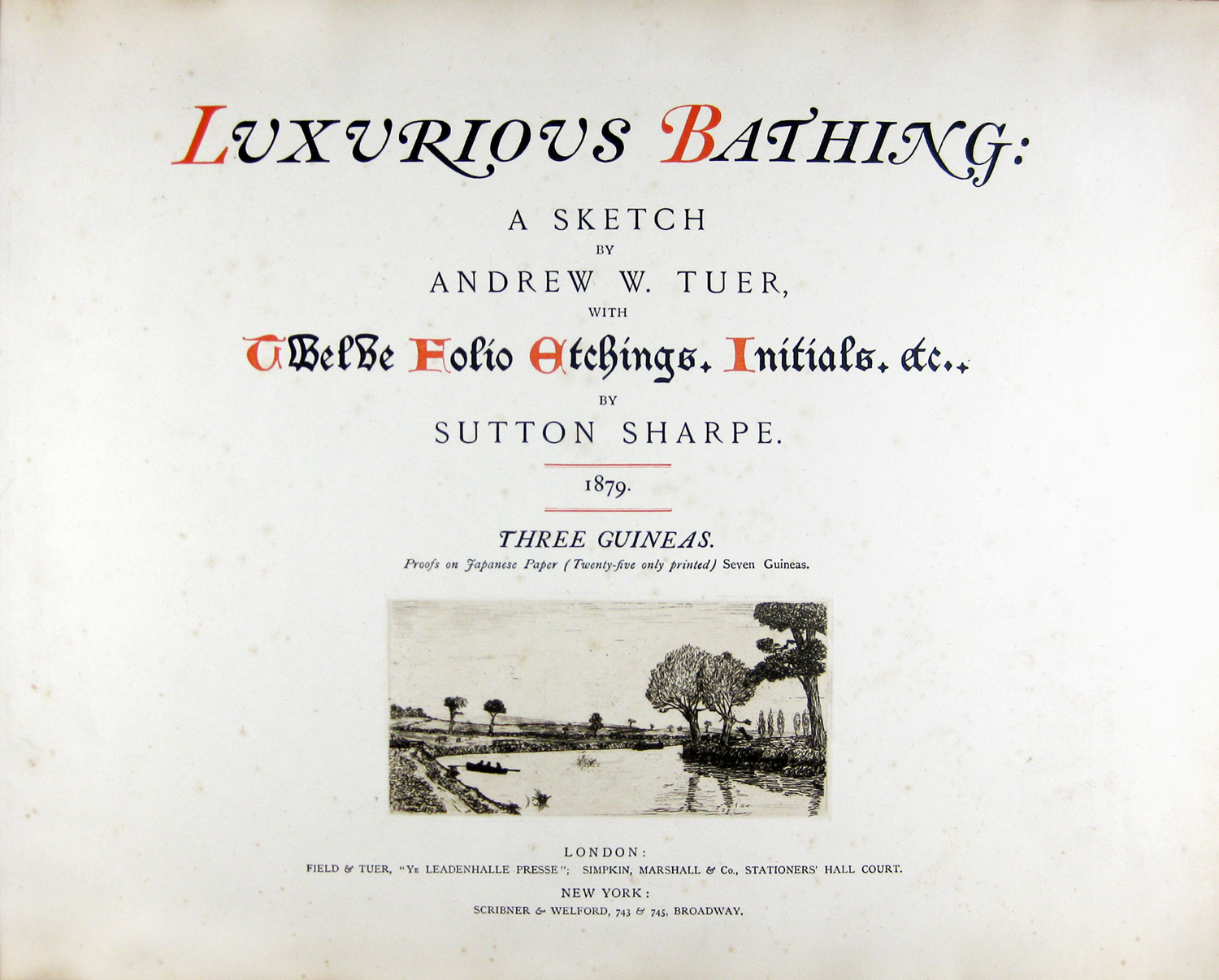
Luxurious Bathing, 1st edition

In 1879, the first official book of its new imprint, the Leadenhall Press, appeared: Tuer’s own Luxurious Bathing, a treatise on the joys of hygiene, with etchings by Sutton Sharpe. From this point on, Scribner was the firm's U.S. import partner. The second edition was issued the following year in a smaller format with etchings by Tristram Ellis. Tuer's passion for collecting soon led to the two-volume Bartolozzi and his Works, with a biographical account, information on how to date impressions and identify deceptions, and a list of over 2,000 engravings. In 1884, Tuer published a collection of printers' jokes from the pages of the Paper & Printing Trades Journal, titled Quads within Quads, consisting of a midget folio housed in a block of extra pages at the back of a duodecimo "enlarged edition." The prospectus described it as "A book and a box, or rather two books and a box, and yet after all not a box at all, but a book and only one book."

The catalogue as a whole reflected Tuer's energetic and whimsical nature and his interest in antiquarian subjects, including London history and early children's books. However, Tuer was also an experimenter, and some books were ahead of their time in content, design, and printing. Under his stewardship, the Leadenhall Press went on to issue more than 450 publications of all kinds on a wide variety of subjects by many prominent authors and illustrators of the time, ranging in price from sixpence to several guineas for special limited editions.

In 1891, Abraham Field died, and the following year the firm was incorporated as Leadenhall Press Ltd. Publishing continued throughout the nineties, and one of Tuer's most important works was published in the 1896: History of the Horn-Book (still the best study of the subject).

Tuer died of pleurisy on 24 February 1900 and was buried in Kensal Green Cemetery. In its obituary of 5 March, the Pall Mall Gazette wrote: “London publishing is the poorer in high spirits and humour by the death of Mr. Andrew Tuer. In all his doings he was mirthful, and he gave readers several very excellent books.”

The Dictionary of National Biography describes him as an "omnivorous collector", who filled his house in Campden Hill Road Notting Hill with "books, engravings, clocks, china, silver and bric-a-brac of the most varied description".

== Family ==
Tuer's wife was Thomasine Louisa. They had no children. Mrs. Tuer's godson was the Cambridge historian J. P. T (John Patrick Tuer) Bury, who wrote articles about Tuer for the Book Collector and the Bookplate Journal.

== Bibliography ==
- Luxurious Bathing: A Sketch' (1879, 2nd edition 1880). Digitized by Google from Harvard University Library.
- Bartolozzi and His Works (1882, 2nd edition 1885 in two volumes). Digitized by Google (unattributed).
- The Kaukneigh Awlminek, 1883 (1882)
- London Cries: with Six Charming Children (1883). Digitized by Google from the Bodleian Library, Oxford University.
- Quads for Authors, Editors, & Devils (1884, issued as a "midget folio," an "Enlarged Edition," and as Quads within Quads, bound in vellum, with the midget folio housed in hollowed-out pages at the back of the larger version)
- John Bull's Womankind. (Suggestions for an Alteration in the Law of Copyright in the Titles of Books) (1884, pamphlet)
- Old London Street Cries and the Cries of To-day (1885). Digitized by Google from Harvard University Library.
- The Follies & Fashions of Our Grandfathers (1807) (1886–1887). Digitized by Google from the Library of Harvard University Library.
- 1,000 Quaint Cuts from Books of Other Days (1886)
- The First Year of a Silken Reign (1837–8) (1887, written with Charles Edward Fagan). Digitized by University of California Libraries.
- "Thenks Awf’lly!" Sketched in Cockney and Hung on Twelve Pegs (1890)Digitized by Google from Harvard University Library.
- "The Art of Silhouetting" in the English Illustrated Magazine, No. 82, Vol. 7, July 1890, p. 747–752. Digitized by Google from the Indiana University Library.
- The Book of Delightful and Strange Designs, Being One Hundred Facsimile Illustrations of the Art of the Japanese Stencil Cutter (1892)
- History of the Horn-Book (1896 in two volumes with seven facsimile hornbooks and battledores in compartments at the front of each volume, 2nd edition 1897 in one volume)
- Pages and Pictures from Forgotten Children’s Books (1898–99). Digitized by the Robarts Library, University of Toronto.
- Stories from Old-Fashioned Children’s Books (1899–1900), digitized by Google from the New York Public Library.

== Sources ==
- "Andrew W. Tuer." British Printer, Vol. IV, No. 34, July–August 1893: 225–226.
- "Andrew White Tuer," Printing Review–Magazine of the Printing Industry, Number 54, Summer 1950: 39–40.
- Bullen, George, Esq., F.S.A. Caxton Celebration 1877. Catalogue of the Loan Collection of Antiquities, Curiosities and Appliances connected with the Art of Printing. London: N. Trübner & Co., 1877.
- Bury, J. P. T. [John Patrick Tuer]. "A. W. Tuer and the Leadenhall Press." Book Collector, Volume 36, No. 2, Summer 1987: 225–243.
- Bury, J. P. T. "Andrew White Tuer and His Bookplates." Bookplate Journal, Vol. 6, Number 1, March 1988: 5–14.
- "The Late Andrew W. Tuer and His Book-Plates." Ex Libris Journal (Journal of the Ex Libris Society), Vol. X, Part 9, September 1900: 132.
- Jennett, Sean. "Printers' International Specimen Exchange." Print IX: 4, March–April 1955: 17–18.
- Johnson, A. F. "Old-Face Types in the Victorian Age," Monotype Recorder, Sept.-Dec. 1931: 5–14.
- Johnson, Dr. John. "The Development of Printing, other than Book Printing." The Library, Fourth Series, XVII-1, 1936. pp. 22–35.
- Meynell, Francis. English Printed Books. (London: Collins, 1946).
- Peltz, Lucy. “Tuer, Andrew White (1838–1900).” Oxford Dictionary of National Biography. Oxford: Oxford University Press, 2004.
- Dodgson, Campbell (1901). "Tuer, Andrew White" . In Lee, Sidney (ed.). Dictionary of National Biography (1st supplement). London: Smith, Elder & Co.
- Shepard, Leslie. The History of the Horn Book: a Bibliographical Essay. ([Cambridge]: Rampant Lions Press for the Broadsheet King, 1977).
- White, Gleeson. "Children's Books and Their Illustrators." International Studio, Special Winter Number, 1897-8: 3–68.
- Young, Matthew McLennan. Field & Tuer, the Leadenhall Press. A Checklist with an Appreciation of Andrew White Tuer. Oak Knoll Press and the British Library, 2010.
