= Lucy Bowen McCauley =

American dance instructor

Lucy Bowen McCauley (born March 28, 1959) is an American choreographer, dancer, and teacher. She founded the Bowen McCauley Dance Company (BMDC) in 1996 and served as its artistic director until 2021. Based in Washington, DC, she has created over 100 choreographic works.

== Early life and education ==
Born in Indianapolis, Indiana, Bowen McCauley studied dance at the Jordan School of the Arts in Indianapolis, the Interlochen Center for the Arts, and with the Joffrey Ballet in New York City (since relocated to Chicago). She returned to New York City after graduating from Park Tudor High School to continue her studies and joined the Joffrey Concert Group in 1978, launching her professional career.

== Career ==
=== Dance performance ===
Bowen McCauley performed as a professional ballet dancer with the Joffrey Concert Group, the Maryland Ballet, and the Virginia State Ballet. Her career in classical ballet ended in 1984 after a car incident injured her foot, preventing her from dancing en pointe. She subsequently transitioned to modern and contemporary dance and relocated to the Washington, D.C., area in 1987.

In Washington, she performed with DC Contemporary Dance Theatre, Daniel West Dancers, and Eric Hampton Dance, as well as with the Bowen McCauley Dance Company. The Washington Post identified her as a leading female dancer in the Washington, D.C., area.

As artistic director of BMDC, she choreographed works, trained dancers, and performed. Her career as a professional dancer continued into the 2010s before she ended her performing career to focus on choreographing, directing, and teaching.

=== Choreography ===
While working as an instructor at The Washington Ballet school, founder Mary Day recognized Bowen McCauley's choreographic works and encouraged her to continue developing original pieces. This encouragement contributed to the founding of BMDC in 1996, for which she created more than 100 choreographic works. She has frequently collaborated with live musicians as part of her choreographic practice. Composers with whom she has developed works include Jason Ringenberg of Jason and the Scorchers, Wolfgang Seierl, Andrew Earle Simpson, and Larry Alan Smith.

In addition to individual composers, Bowen McCauley has collaborated with a range of musical ensembles and performers, including the Alexandria Symphony Orchestra, the Fairfax Symphony Orchestra, TONE, the National Chamber Ensemble, Gisele and Fabio Witkowski, the Cantate Chamber Singers, Gaetano de Bacco, and Nikola Paskalov.

Beyond her work for BMDC, she has created choreography for and in collaboration with other organizations, including Dance Kaleidoscope in Indianapolis; the Hartt School at the University of Hartford (commission); Maryland Youth Ballet; Moveius Contemporary Ballet; Nashville Ballet; Sarasota Contemporary Dance (commission); the Washington Ballet Studio Company (commission); and the Wintergreen Music Festival (commission). As of 2026, Bowen McCauley continues to choreograph occasionally for special projects.

=== Artistic director ===
Bowen McCauley founded Bowen McCauley Dance Company (BMDC) in 1996 and served as its artistic director throughout the company's 25-year history. She created more than 100 choreographic works, developing a repertoire that combined classical ballet technique with contemporary movement, humor, and music from a wide range of genres. In a 1996 review in The Washington Post, Sarah Kaufman described McCauley's choreography as combining ballet and modern dance with quirky humor and unexpected gestures. Kaufman also praised the musicality and emotional subtlety of works such as At Last, while noting that other pieces were less successful.

As the company developed, critics continued to identify its distinctive blend of ballet and modern dance. A 2000 Washington Post review described BMDC's movement vocabulary as quirky, humorous, and exuberant. In 2002, Lisa Traiger characterized its style as a hybrid of ballet and modern dance, with balletic lines punctuated by angular gestures, turned-in feet, and offbeat movements. She also noted that the company had become a mainstay of the local dance scene and was performing at the Kennedy Center with live musical accompaniment.

Live music became a recurring feature of McCauley's artistic direction. BMDC worked with classical musicians and chamber ensembles, early-music performers, and rock musicians. In 2004, the company presented Telemetry, an ensemble work choreographed to electronic music by the group TONE. Pamela Squires's review described the piece as a forceful departure from McCauley's more lyrical work, with vigorous dancing and unexpected imagery. The company also collaborated with the early-music ensemble Hesperus and participated in a cultural exchange with a dance company from Monterrey, Mexico, in 2004.

McCauley's repertoire drew on classical compositions, popular songs, and alternative rock, as well as literary and historical subjects. Afoot in Vienna grew out of movement explorations in different locations in Vienna, undertaken at the invitation of Austrian composer and visual artist Wolfgang Seierl. Seierl recorded the explorations and composed music for the resulting work, while McCauley developed them into a series of choreographed pieces. Other works reinterpreted familiar stories and classical dance material. In 2013, for example, McCauley presented new works based on Humpty Dumpty, The Rite of Spring, and Shakespeare's Antony and Cleopatra.

McCauley also pursued collaborations with popular musicians. In 2014, she developed Victory Road, an evening-length work created with the country-punk band Jason and the Scorchers, combining live music, athletic dance, and a biographical narrative. The work was presented at the Kennedy Center.

BMDC performed at venues including Dance Place, the Atlas Performing Arts Center, and the Kennedy Center, and toured internationally, including trips to Aachen, Germany in 2006 and a trip to China in 2013. That year, The Washington Post included the company among the Washington area's established contemporary dance troupes, noting its classical ballet training and its use of live music and regional musicians. The company also developed educational and community programs, including school residencies and performances.

BMDC marked its 20th anniversary in 2015 with a program at Dance Place combining three repertory works with Part of the Main, a new work set to piano music by Polish-German composer Xaver Scharwenka. The anniversary program showcased McCauley's distinctive blend of ballet and modern dance, as well as the company's established repertoire and continuing development of new choreography. In March 2016, the company continued its anniversary celebrations at the Kennedy Center's Terrace Theater with Twenty Years with Love, featuring the world premiere of Ars Amatoria, inspired by the Roman poet Ovid's writings on love and seduction, alongside other works exploring human relationships.

BMDC concluded its 25th and final season on September 14, 2021, with a gala performance at the Kennedy Center's Eisenhower Theater, marking the culmination of the company's 25-year history and its first appearance in that theater after performing regularly at the Kennedy Center for two decades. The program, titled Two Artists Reunite for the Company’s Season 25 Finale, featured three world premieres, repertory works, guest artists, and live musical accompaniment. Among the premieres were Insistent Music, a collaboration between McCauley and composer Erberk Eryilmaz, and Imago, set to music by Nikola Glassl. The performance brought together eight company dancers and eleven musicians and reflected McCauley's longstanding integration of dance and live music. The Washington Post described the event as a grand finale honoring McCauley's choreographic legacy, the company's longstanding contributions to the arts community and it community outreach and school residencies. Following the performance, McCauley retired BMDC, while continuing her work as a choreographer and her teaching Dance for Parkinson's. As the company was being retired, noting its 25-year history, its more than 100 original works, its support for professional dancers, and its educational outreach, the Virginia State Senate created Resolution 732, officially recognizing Bowen McCauley Dance Company.

=== Teacher ===
Bowen McCauley has taught at a range of institutions, including Finis Jhung Dance Studio in New York City, The Exercise Exchange in New York City, the Washington Ballet School, Maryland Youth Ballet, and the Kennedy Center. She has also taught master classes in the United States, Europe, Mexico and China. Dancers who studied with her include Elisa Clark, Daniel Cooke, Mark Giragosian, Ilana Goldman, and Alvin Tovstogray.

Bowen McCauley developed a stretch technique known as Bowen McCauley Stretch, based on methods learned from Jean-Paul Mustone. She has been featured in publications including Sports Illustrated, USA Today, Dance Teacher, and The Washington Post, and has worked with elite-level athletes, including Olympic gymnasts Dominique Dawes and Elise Ray, as well as students in her dance classes. She continues to teach this stretch technique in the Washington, D.C., area.

She is a trained and certified instructor of Dance for Parkinson's Disease (Dance for PD) and has taught classes for people living with Parkinson's disease since 2007. She is the Director of Dance for PD Mid-Atlantic, a large regional hub of Dance for PD. In addition to teaching classes in the Washington, D.C., area, she has trained other instructors and taught master classes in several U.S. states. In partnership with Dance for PD, she established the Bowen Award for Inclusive Choreography, which provides financial support to choreographers creating works for dancers living with Parkinson's disease. She also co-founded the Lucy Bowen Fund, which provides financial assistance to Dance for PD instructors seeking to establish or expand local programs.

Bowen McCauley has served in various roles within the Washington, D.C., arts community, including on the Arlington Chamber of Commerce, the Arlington Arts Commission, the Arlington Economic Development Commission, and the board of the National Chamber Ensemble. At the national level, she served as chair of the National Leadership Council for Dance under the auspices of Dance USA.

== Awards ==
Bowen McCauley has received several awards and honors for her contributions to dance and arts education. Among which are:

- 2021 Arlington Community Foundation's Spirit of Community Award
- The Women of Vision Award
- Pola Nirenska Award for Outstanding Achievement in Dance
- Outstanding Achievement Award in Dance Education from Dance Metro DC
- Alumni Path of Inspiration Award from Interlochen
- 2013 "Dominion ArtStars" award from Virginians for the Arts
- Elizabeth Campbell Award for the Advancement of the Arts
- James B. Hunter, III Arlington Community Hero Award
- Innovator by the Genetic Alliance
- State of Virginia Senate Resolution 742 (2021), commending Bowen McCauley Dance Company

== Personal life ==
Bowen McCauley has lived in Arlington County, Virginia since 1987.
