= Lamond-Riggs/Lillian J. Huff Neighborhood Library =

Public library in Washington, D.C., the United States

Lamond-Riggs/Lillian J. Huff Library
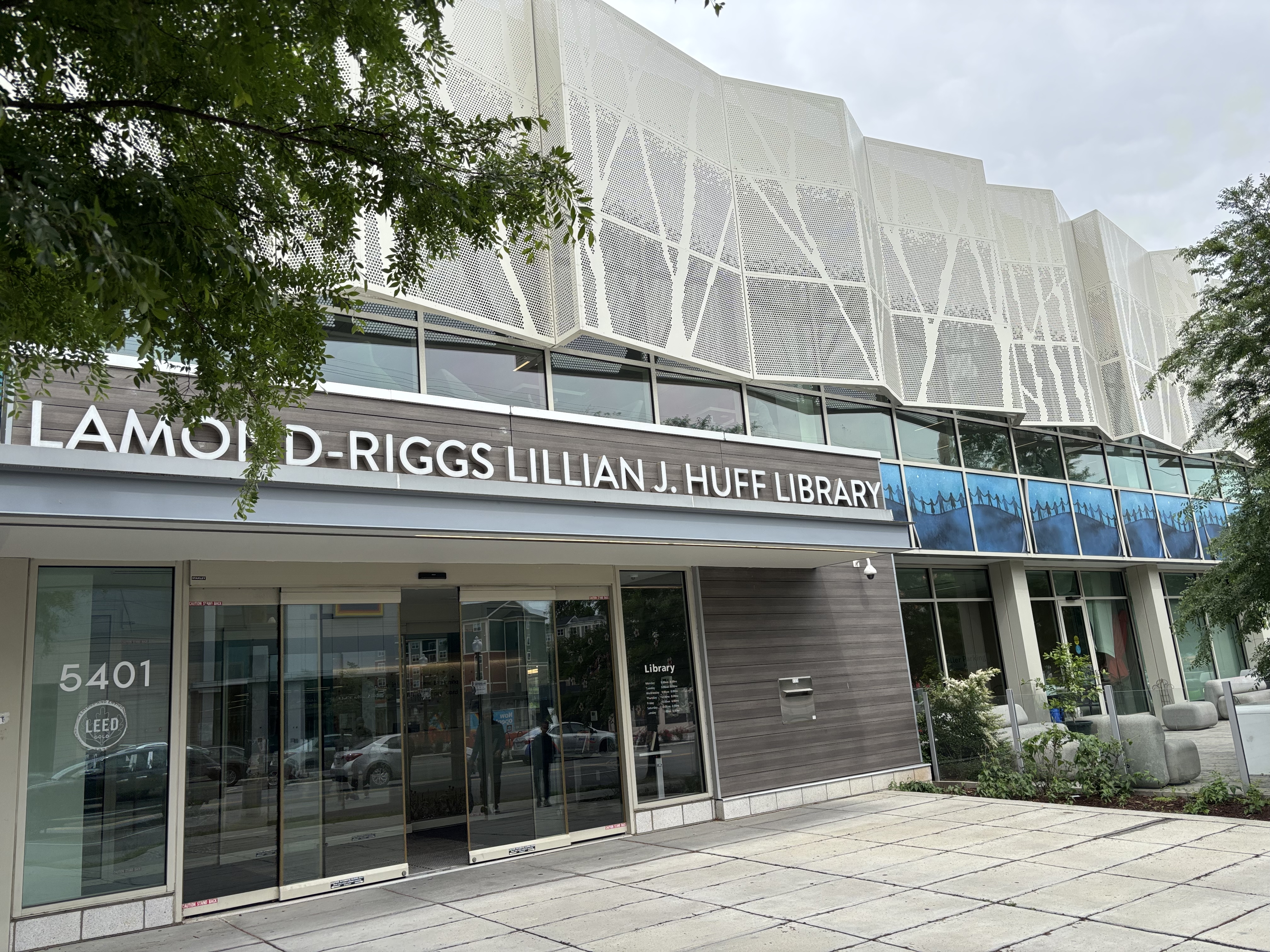
- 38.955076°N 76.999666°W
- Location: 5401 South Dakota Ave. NE Washington, DC 20011, United States
- Type: Public library
- Established: 1983
- Branch of: District of Columbia Public Library

Other information
- Website: https://www.dclibrary.org/lamond

The Lamond-Riggs/Lillian J. Huff Neighborhood Library is a branch of the District of Columbia Public Library in the Queens Chapel neighborhood of Washington, D.C. It is located at 5401 South Dakota Avenue NE. Residents had requested a library for the area as early as 1957; the original building opened in 1983 at a cost of $2 million.

In the late 2010s, the city approved a $20 million project to rebuild the library, designed by Hammel, Green and Abrahamson. Razing of the building began on January 4, 2021, and the library reopened on June 27, 2022.

The library was renamed the Lamond-Riggs/Lillian J. Huff Library in 2022 to honor the legacy of activist and organizer Lillian J. Huff.

The Lamond-Riggs/Lillian J. Huff Neighborhood Library
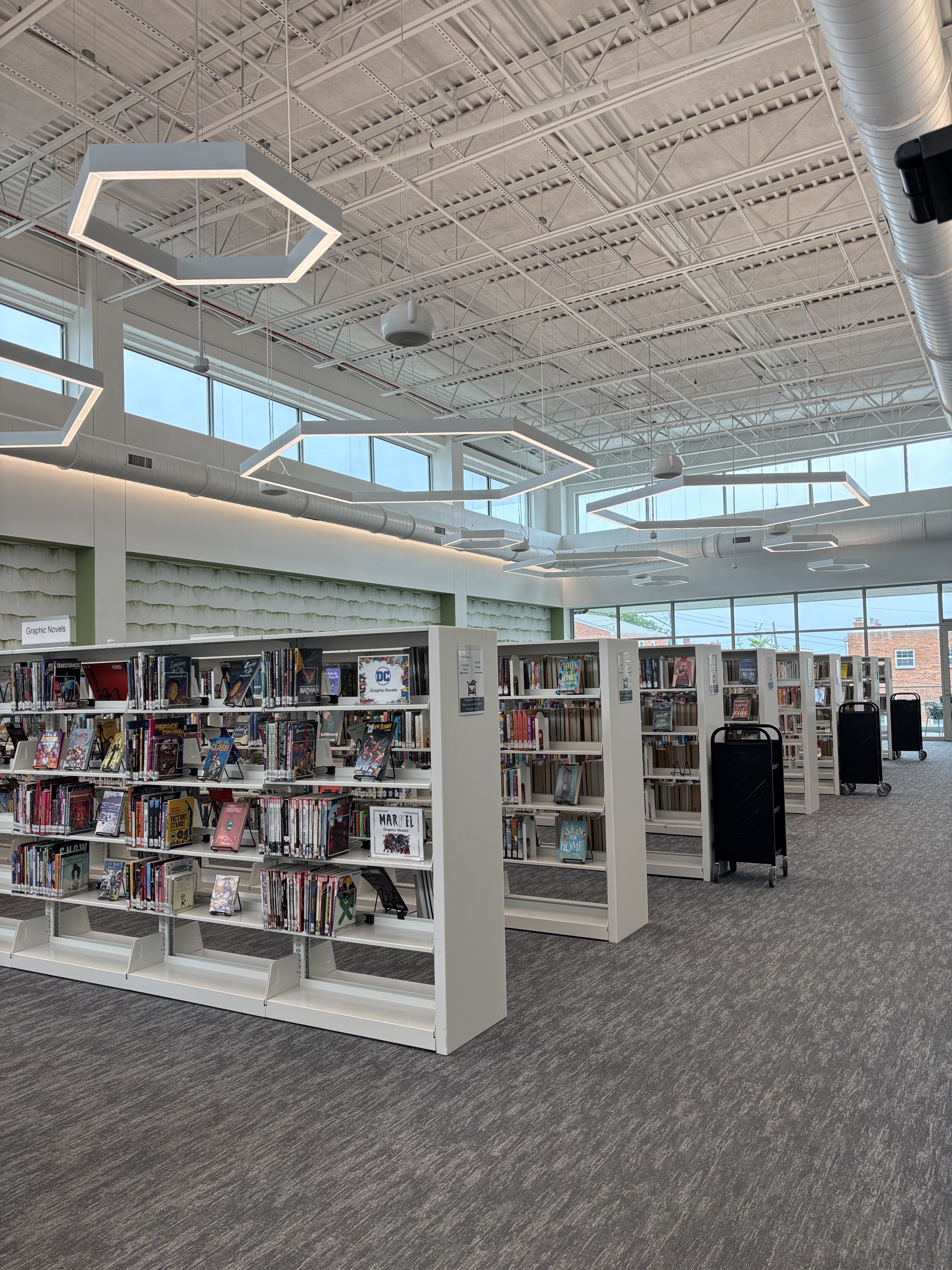
The second floor of the rebuilt library in 2026.

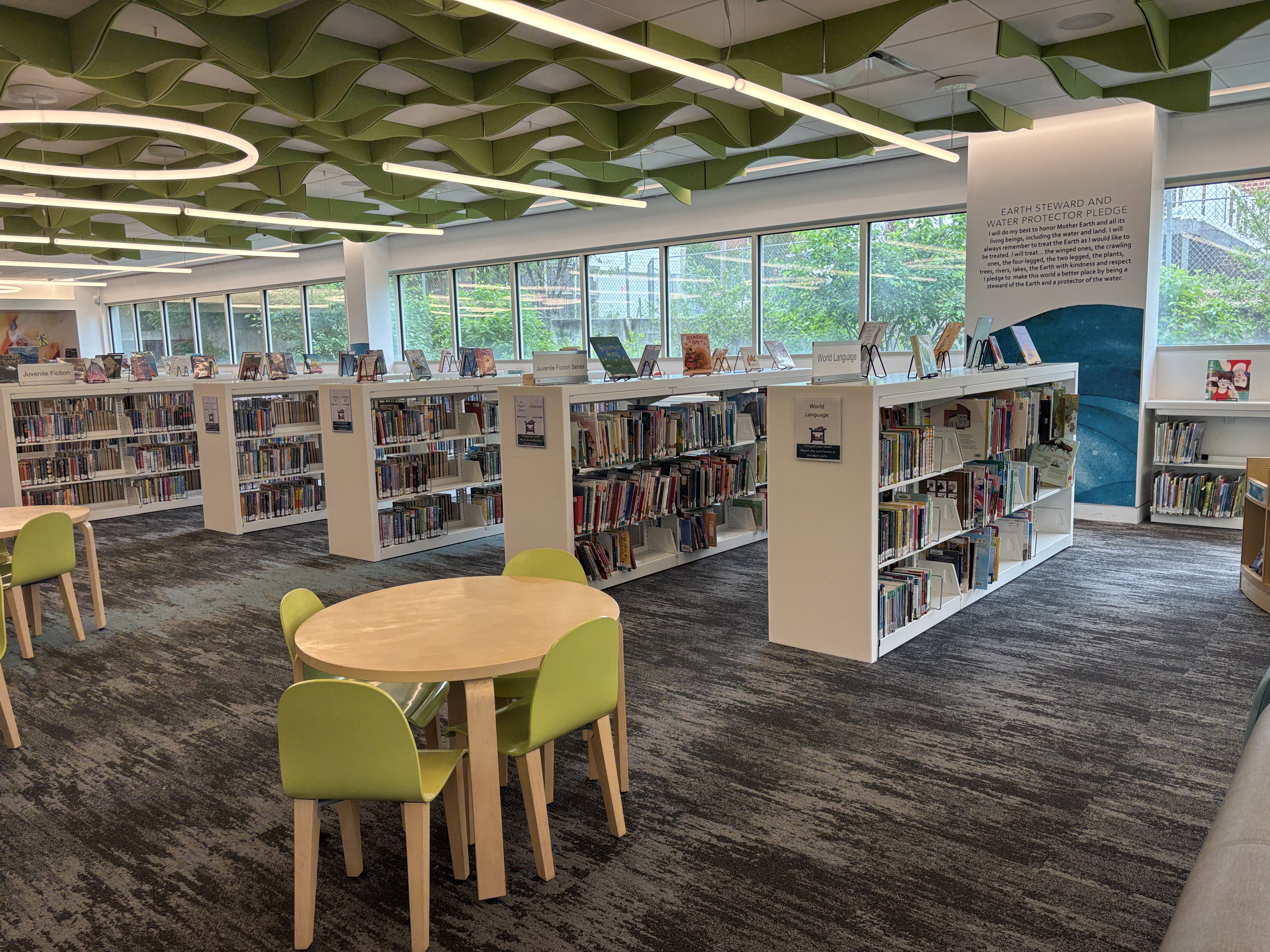
The new children's room.

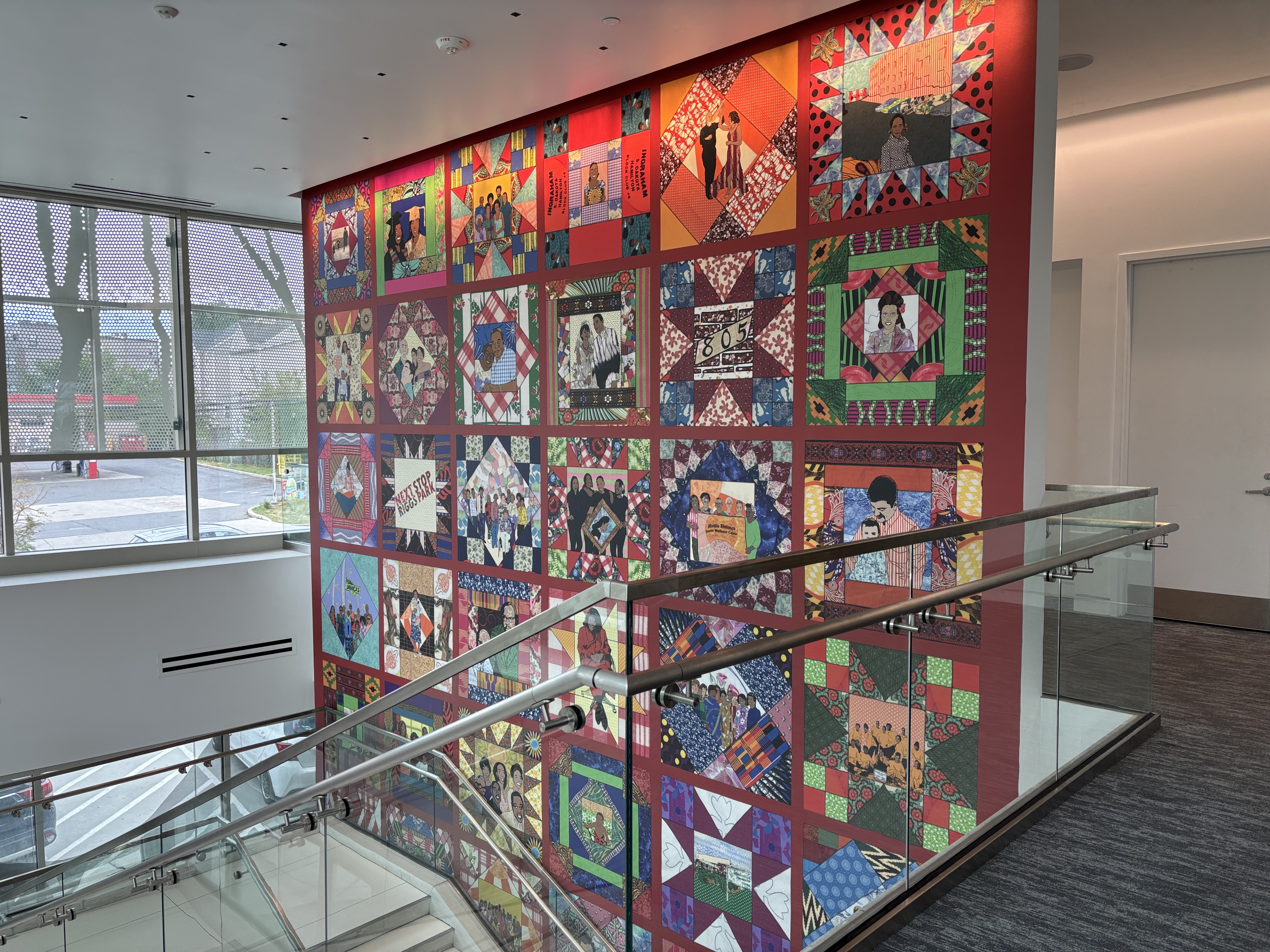
Installed in 2023, the library's "Heritage Wall" art installation features scanned family photos and fabric swatches from local residents, which were combined by artist Michelle Lisa Herman to resemble a quilt.
