= Klingon language =

Language constructed for Star Trek

Klingon
- tlhIngan Hol
- Pronunciation: [ˈt͡ɬɪ.ŋɑn xol]
- Created by: Marc Okrand, James Doohan, Jon Povill
- Setting and usage: initially Star Trek films and television series, now used in many other places
- Users: (None as a first language; around a dozen fluent speakers cited 1996)
- Purpose: Constructed languages: Artistic languages; Fictional languages; Klingon
- Writing system: Latin script (Klingon alphabet); Klingon script
- Sources: Constructed languages A priori languages

Official status
- Regulated by: Marc Okrand

Language codes
- ISO 639-2: tlh
- ISO 639-3: tlh
- Glottolog: klin1234

The Klingon language (Klingon: tlhIngan Hol, pIqaD: _{ }, pronounced [ˈt͡ɬɪ.ŋɑn xol]) is the constructed language spoken by a fictional alien race called the Klingons in the Star Trek universe.

Described in the 1985 book The Klingon Dictionary by Marc Okrand, and deliberately designed to sound "alien", Klingon has a number of typologically uncommon features. The language's basic sound, along with a few words, was devised by actor James Doohan ("Scotty") and producer Jon Povill for Star Trek: The Motion Picture. The film marked the first time the language had been heard. In all previous appearances, Klingons spoke in English, even to each other. Klingon was subsequently developed by Okrand into a full-fledged language.

Klingon is sometimes referred to as Klingonese (most notably in the Star Trek: The Original Series episode "The Trouble with Tribbles", where it was actually pronounced by a Klingon character as "Klingonee" /ˈklɪŋɡɒni/), but among the Klingon-speaking community, this is often understood to refer to another Klingon language called Klingonaase that was introduced in John M. Ford's 1984 Star Trek novel The Final Reflection, and appears in other Star Trek novels by Ford.

The play A Klingon Christmas Carol is the first production that is primarily in Klingon (only the narrator speaks English). The opera ʼuʼ is entirely in Klingon.

A small number of people are capable of conversing in Klingon. When Klingon was created, its vocabulary was heavily centered on Star Trek-Klingon concepts such as spacecraft or warfare, therefore it was hard for everyday use because of the lack of words for a casual conversation. With the release of the interactive "Learn Klingon" course of the Talk Now! series in September 2011, and the intense contact between Klingonists and Marc Okrand, the situation has changed; new words have been introduced, offering more everyday vocabulary.

== History ==
=== Creation ===
The language is first mentioned in the original Star Trek series episode "The Trouble with Tribbles" (1967), but is not heard until Star Trek: The Motion Picture (1979). According to the actor who spoke the lines, Mark Lenard, James Doohan recorded the lines he had written on a tape, and Lenard transcribed the recorded lines in a way he found useful in learning them.

For Star Trek III: The Search for Spock (1984), director Leonard Nimoy and writer-producer Harve Bennett wanted the Klingons to speak a structured language instead of random gibberish, and so commissioned a full language, based on the phrases Doohan had originated, from Marc Okrand, who had earlier constructed four lines of Vulcan dialogue for Star Trek II: The Wrath of Khan.

Okrand enlarged the lexicon and developed a grammar based on Doohan's original dozen words. The language appeared intermittently in later films featuring the original cast; for example, in Star Trek V: The Final Frontier (1989) and in Star Trek VI: The Undiscovered Country (1991), where translation difficulties served as a plot device.

Okrand had studied some Native American and Southeast Asian languages, (Note: An attribution to Okrand may be found in the museum displays at the San Juan Bautista, California State Historic Park, which includes a short mention of the local Mutsun native people whom Okrand studied for his thesis.) and phonological and grammatical features of these languages "worked their way into Klingon, but for the most part, not by design." Okrand himself has stated that a design principle of the Klingon language was dissimilarity to existing natural languages in general, and English in particular. He therefore avoided patterns that are typologically common and deliberately chose features that occur relatively infrequently in human languages. This includes above all the highly asymmetric consonant inventory and the basic word order. Kwantlen journalist Robert Jago has pointed out similarities between Klingon and Halkomelem, a language spoken by the Indigenous people of the area where James Doohan grew up.

=== Internal history ===
Within the fictional universe of Star Trek, Klingon is derived from the original language spoken by the messianic figure Kahless the Unforgettable, who united the Klingon home-world of QoʼnoS under one empire more than 1500 years ago.

With the advent of the series Star Trek: The Next Generation (1987)—in which one of the main characters, Worf, was a Klingon—and successors, the language and various cultural aspects for the fictional species were expanded. In the episode "A Matter of Honor", several members of a Klingon ship's crew speak a language that is not translated for the benefit of the viewer (even Commander Riker, enjoying the benefits of a universal translator, is unable to understand) until one Klingon orders the others to "speak their [i.e., human] language".

A small number of non-Klingon characters were later depicted in Star Trek as having learned to speak Klingon, notably Jean-Luc Picard and Dax.

=== Canonicity ===
An important concept to spoken and written Klingon is canonicity. Only words and grammatical forms introduced by Marc Okrand are considered canonical Klingon by the KLI and most Klingonists. However, as the growing number of speakers employ different strategies to express themselves, it is often unclear as to what level of neologism is permissible. New vocabulary has been collected in a list maintained by the KLI until 2005 and had since then been followed up by Klingon expert Lieven Litaer until the KLI's website was renewed in 2015.

Two "non-canon" dialects of Klingon are hinted at in the novelization of Star Trek III: The Search for Spock, as Saavik speaks in Klingon to the only Klingon officer aboard Cpt. Kruge's starship after his death, as the survivors of the Enterprise's self-destruction transport up from the crumbling Genesis Planet to the Klingon ship. The surviving officer, Maltz, states that he speaks the Rumaiy dialect, while Saavik is speaking to him in the Kumburan dialect of Klingon, per Maltz's spoken reply to her.

== Language usage ==
=== Speakers ===
A small number of people are capable of conversing in Klingon. Arika Okrent guessed in her 2009 book In the Land of Invented Languages that there might be 20–30 fluent speakers. Its vocabulary, heavily centered on Star Trek–Klingon concepts such as spacecraft or warfare, can sometimes make it cumbersome for everyday use. For instance, while words for transporter ionizer unit (jolvoyʼ) or bridge (of a ship) (meH) have been known since close to the language's inception, the word for bridge in the sense of a crossing over water (QI) was unknown until August 2012. Nonetheless, mundane conversations are possible among skilled speakers.

One Klingon speaker, d'Armond Speers of the Klingon Language Institute, raised his son Alec to speak Klingon as a native language, while the boy's mother communicated with him in English. Alec rarely responded to his father in Klingon, although when he did, his pronunciation was "excellent". After Alec's fifth birthday, Speers reported that his son eventually stopped responding to him when spoken to in Klingon as he clearly did not enjoy it, so Speers switched to English.

In 2007, a report surfaced that Multnomah County, Oregon, was hiring Klingon translators for its mental health program in case patients came into a psychiatric hospital speaking nothing but Klingon. Most circulations of the report seemingly implied that this was a problem that health officials faced before; however, the original report indicated that this was just a precaution for a hypothetical and that said translator would only be paid on an as needed basis. After the report was misinterpreted, the County issued another release noting that releasing the original report was a "mistake".

In May 2009, Simon & Schuster, in collaboration with Ultralingua Inc., a developer of electronic dictionary applications, announced the release of a suite of electronic Klingon language software for most computer platforms including a dictionary, a phrasebook, and an audio learning tool.

In September 2011, Eurotalk released the "Learn Klingon" course in its Talk Now! series. The language is displayed in both Latin and pIqaD fonts, making this the first language course written in pIqaD and approved by CBS and Marc Okrand. The course was translated by Jonathan Brown and Okrand and used the Hol-pIqaD TrueType font.

In August 2016, a company in the United Kingdom, Bidvine, began offering Klingon lessons as one of their services.

There are Klingon language meetings and linguists or students are interested in researching this topic, even writing essays about the language or its users.

Klingon speakers are also referred to in non-Star Trek TV series, including Frasier, The Big Bang Theory, and Lucifer, and were heavily featured in the "My Big Fat Geek Wedding" episode of The Simpsons. In the 2017 film Please Stand By, in which a young autistic woman played by Dakota Fanning leaves her group home in San Francisco to deliver a Star Trek screenplay she wrote to Paramount Pictures, a Los Angeles police officer played by Patton Oswalt coaxes her out of hiding by speaking with her in Klingon.

=== Translated works ===
Hobbyists around the world have studied the Klingon language. At least nine Klingon translations of works of world literature have been published, among which are: Hamlet (Hamlet), ghIlghameS (The Epic of Gilgamesh), paghmoʼ tIn mIS (Much Ado About Nothing), pInʼaʼ qan paQDIʼnorgh (Tao Te Ching), Sun pInʼaʼ veS mIw (The Art of War), chIjwI' tIQ bom (The Rime of the Ancient Mariner), 'aS 'IDnar pIana' Duna (The Wonderful Wizard of Oz), taʼpuq mach (The Little Prince), QelIS boqHarmey (Alice's Adventures in Wonderland), and poH jan (The Time Machine).

The Shakespearean choices were inspired by a remark from High Chancellor Gorkon in Star Trek VI: The Undiscovered Country, who said, "You have not experienced Shakespeare until you have read him in the original Klingon." In the bonus material on the DVD, screenwriter Nicholas Meyer and actor William Shatner both explain that this was an allusion to the German myth that Shakespeare was in fact German.

The Bible has been translated partially from English into Klingon. The Klingon Bible Translation Project, coordinated by Melanie Roney, translates the books of the Bible, both the Old and New Testaments, into Klingon. It is promoted by the Klingon Language Institute, whose goals do not include missionary work, but this project was considered worthy of KLI's efforts for purely secular reasons. The linguist and Lojbanist Nick Nicholas, who was responsible for translating Hamlet, has also translated the Gospel of Mark into Klingon.

In Strange New Worlds, S4E3, Human Best Friend, Number One (Rebecca Romijn) sings Bonnie Tyler's Total Eclipse of the Heart in Klingon.

=== Real world usage ===
In July 2015, the Welsh Government issued a written statement in the Klingon language. Following a formal questioning of the Economy Minister Edwina Hart regarding the funding of research into UFO sightings around Cardiff Airport by Member of the Senedd Darren Millar, a press officer in the Minister's office issued the reply:

jang vIDa je due luq. ʼach ghotvamʼeʼ QIʼyjH-devolved qaS

which was translated as: "The minister will reply in due course. However this is a non-devolved matter." (Note: Literally, it reads "Answers[sic] minister and due of course. But regarding behaviour, [military] station devolved occurs.")

=== Use in other media ===
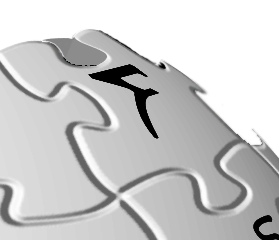
Previous Wikipedia logo with Klingon /r/ character at upper right (2003–2010)

In the Quentin Tarantino film Kill Bill Volume 1 (2003), the opening of the film cites 'Revenge is a dish best served cold' as an 'old Klingon proverb'.

In 2010, a Chicago Theatre company presented a version of Charles Dickens' A Christmas Carol in Klingon language and a Klingon setting. On September 25, 2010, the Washington Shakespeare Company performed selections from Hamlet and Much Ado About Nothing in the Klingon language in Arlington County, Virginia. The performance was proposed by Okrand in his capacity as chairman of the group's board. This performance was reprised on February 27, 2011 featuring Stephen Fry as the Klingon Osric and was filmed by the BBC as part of a 5-part documentary on language entitled Fry's Planet Word.

The Java edition of Minecraft has a Klingon language setting.

The 2003–2010 version of the puzzle globe logo of Wikipedia, representing its multilingualism, contained a Klingon character. When updated in 2010, the Klingon character was removed from the logo, and substituted with one from the Ge'ez script.

In the 2010 Dragon Ball Z Abridged episode "Episode 16", the Klingon language is used as the same language as the Namekian language.

The file management software XYplorer has been translated into Klingon by its developer.

In the 2011 science-fiction comedy Paul, characters (who are science-fiction fans) occasionally communicate in Klingon so that others will not be able to understand them. Clive can be heard speaking Klingon several times in the film; Paul even calls him a psychotic nerd for it.

Microsoft's Bing Translator supports translation to and from Klingon. It would succeed in translating individual words, and phrases included in its training corpus, but was not well tuned for Klingon's system of prefixes and suffixes. Providing examples for the faulty results is difficult, as the software is constantly developing and therefore gives different results for the same prompt.

With the digital-only release of Star Trek: Discovery in 2017, streaming service Netflix announced it would provide Klingon subtitles for the entire first season, translated by Klingon language expert Lieven Litaer. They could be enabled like any other language provided by the streaming service, and were shown using romanized transliteration rather than Klingon script. After the transfer of the series to Paramount+ in 2021, the subtitles were lost.

In 2020 the German artist Hans Solo (Äi-Tiem) released an EP NuqneH, whose 5 tracks are completely rapped in Klingon language.

=== Learning resources ===
The Klingon Language Institute exists to promote the language. The KLI provides a Learn Klingon Online series of lessons to its members. The first few lessons are free to sample.

On March 15, 2018, the language learning site Duolingo opened a beta course in Klingon. After it proved popular, the company offered to promote it from beta status, but due to ongoing software issues regarding Klingon's unexpected use of upper- and lower-case letters and the apostrophe as a consonant instead of punctuation, the course developers chose not to accept the offer until the problems were addressed.

Memrise has user-created materials on various topics.

CBS Studios owns the copyright on the official dictionary and other canonical descriptions of the language. While constructed languages ("conlangs") are viewed as creations with copyright protection, natural languages are not protected, excluding dictionaries and other works created with them. Mizuki Miyashita and Laura Moll note, "Copyrights on dictionaries are unusual because the entries in the dictionary are not copyrightable as the words themselves are facts, and facts can not be copyrighted. However, the formatting, example sentences, and instructions for dictionary use are created by the author, so they are copyrightable."

== Phonology ==
Latin transcription	Klingon script	IPA
a		/ɑ/
b		/b/
ch		/t͡ʃ/
D		/ɖ/
e		/ɛ/
gh		/ɣ/
H		/x/
I		/ɪ/
j		/d͡ʒ/
l		/l/
m		/m/
n		/n/
ng		/ŋ/
o		/o/
p		/pʰ/
q		/qʰ/
Q		/q͡χ/
r		/r/
S		/ʂ/
t		/tʰ/
tlh		/t͡ɬ/
u		/u/
v		/v/
w		/w/
y		/j/
ʼ		/ʔ/

Klingon has been developed with a phonology that, while based on human natural languages, is intended to sound alien to human ears. When initially developed, Paramount Pictures (owners of the Star Trek franchise) wanted the Klingon language to be guttural and harsh and Okrand wanted it to be unusual, so he selected sounds that combined in ways not generally found in other languages. The effect is mainly achieved by the use of a number of retroflex and uvular consonants in the language's inventory. Klingon has twenty-one consonants and five vowels.

Klingon is normally written in a variant of the Latin alphabet. The orthography of this transliteration is case-sensitive, that is, upper and lower case letters are not interchangeable (uppercase letters mostly represent sounds different from those expected by English speakers), although the only minimal pair is ⟨Q⟩ and ⟨q⟩. In other words, while hol is incorrect Klingon, it cannot be misread as anything but an erroneous form of Hol (which means language); on the other hand, Qat and qat are two different words, the first meaning be popular and the second meaning accompany. In the discussion below, standard Klingon orthography appears in ⟨angle brackets⟩, and the phonemic transcription in the International Phonetic Alphabet is written between /slashes/.

=== Consonants ===
The inventory of consonants in Klingon is spread over a number of places of articulation. In spite of this, the inventory has many gaps: Klingon has no velar plosives, and only one sibilant fricative; common consonants absent in Klingon include /k ɡ f h s z ʃ/. Deliberately, this arrangement is very different from that of most human languages. The combination of an aspirated voiceless alveolar plosive /tʰ/ and a voiced retroflex plosive /ɖ/ is particularly unusual.

Klingon consonants
		Labial	Coronal		Palatal	Dorsal	Glottal
		Labial	median	lateral	Palatal	Dorsal	Glottal
Plosive	voiceless	p /pʰ/	t /tʰ/			q /qʰ/	ʼ /ʔ/
Plosive	voiced	b /b/	D /ɖ/				
Affricate	voiceless			tlh /t͡ɬ/	ch /t͡ʃ/	Q /q͡χ/	
Affricate	voiced				j /d͡ʒ/		
Fricative	voiceless		S /ʂ/			H /x/	
Fricative	voiced	v /v/				gh /ɣ/	
Nasal		m /m/	n /n/			ng /ŋ/	
Trill			r /r/				
Approximant		w /w/		l /l/	y /j/		

There are a few dialectal pronunciation differences

- In the Krotmag dialect /b/ and /ɖ/ are realized as nasal stops [m] and [ɳ]
- In the Tak'ev dialect /b/ and /ɖ/ are pre-nasalized oral stops [mb] and [ɳɖ]

In the Morskan dialect:

- /t͡ɬ/ is a central affricate [t͡s]
- /x/ is realized as glottal [h] syllable-initially and deleted syllable-finally
- /q͡χ/ is realized as a velar fricative [x]

=== Vowels ===
In contrast to its consonants, Klingon's inventory of vowels is simple, and similar to those of many human languages, such as Spanish or Japanese. There are five vowels spaced more or less evenly around the vowel space, with two back rounded vowels, one back unrounded vowel, and two front or near-front unrounded vowels. The vowel inventory is asymmetrical in that the back rounded vowels are tense and the front vowels are lax.

The two front vowels, ⟨e⟩ and ⟨I⟩, represent sounds that are found in English, but are more open and lax than a typical English speaker might assume when reading Klingon text written in the Latin alphabet, thus causing the consonants of a word to be more prominent. This enhances the sense that Klingon is a clipped and harsh-sounding language.

Klingon vowels
	Front	Central	Back
Close			u /u/
Near-close	I /ɪ/		
Close-mid			o /o/
Open-mid	e /ɛ/		
Open			a /ɑ/

⟨a⟩ – /ɑ/ – open back unrounded vowel (in English spa)
⟨e⟩ – /ɛ/ – open-mid front unrounded vowel (in English bed)
⟨I⟩ – /ɪ/ – near-close near-front unrounded vowel (in English bit)
⟨o⟩ – /o/ – close-mid back rounded vowel (in French eau, Spanish no, or Scottish English boat)
⟨u⟩ – /u/ – close back rounded vowel (in French coup, Spanish tu, or old-fashioned English you)

Diphthongs can be analyzed phonetically as the combination of the five vowels plus one of the two semivowels /w/ and /j/ (represented by ⟨w⟩ and ⟨y⟩, respectively). Thus, the combinations ⟨ay⟩, ⟨ey⟩, ⟨Iy⟩, ⟨oy⟩, ⟨uy⟩, ⟨aw⟩, ⟨ew⟩ and ⟨Iw⟩ are possible. There are no words in the Klingon language that contain *⟨ow⟩ or *⟨uw⟩.

=== Syllable structure ===
Based on the analysis of the vocabulary, Klingon follows a strict syllable structure. A syllable must start with a consonant (including the glottal stop) followed by one vowel. In prefixes and rare other syllables, this is enough. More commonly, this consonant-vowel pair is followed by one consonant or one of three biconsonantal codas: /-wʼ -yʼ -rgh/. Thus, ta "record", tar "poison" and targh "targ" (a type of animal) are all legal syllable forms, but *tarD and *ar are not. Despite this, one suffix takes the shape vowel+consonant: the endearment suffix -oy.

=== Stress ===
In verbs, the stressed syllable is usually the verbal stem itself, as opposed to a prefix or any suffixes, except when a suffix ending with ⟨ʼ⟩ is separated from the verb by at least one other suffix, in which case the suffix ending in ⟨ʼ⟩ is also stressed. In addition, stress may shift to a suffix that is meant to be emphasized.

In nouns, the final syllable of the stem (the noun itself, excluding any affixes) is stressed. If any syllables ending in ⟨ʼ⟩ are present, the stress shifts to those syllables.

The stress in other words seems to be variable, but this is not a serious issue because most of these words are only one syllable in length. There are some words which should fall under the rules above, but do not, although using the standard rules would still be acceptable.

== Grammar ==
Klingon is an agglutinative language, using mainly affixes in order to alter the function or meaning of words. Some nouns have inherently plural forms, such as jengvaʼ "plate" (vs. ngop "plates"), but most nouns require a suffix to express plurality explicitly. Depending on the type of noun (body part, being capable of using language, or neither) the suffix changes. For beings capable of using language, the suffix is -puʼ, as in tlhInganpuʼ, meaning "Klingons," or jaghpuʼ, meaning "enemies". For body parts, the plural suffix is -Duʼ, as in mInDuʼ, "eyes". For items that are neither body parts nor capable of speech, the suffix is -mey, such as in Hovmey ("stars"), or targhmey ("targs") for a Klingon animal somewhat resembling a boar. (However, a plural suffix is never obligatory. To say "The stars are beautiful", ʼIH Hovmey and ʼIH Hov are equally grammatical, although the second can also mean "The star is beautiful".)

The words loD and beʼ, which on their own mean "man" and "woman" respectively, can be used in compound words to refer to the referent's sex. For example, from puq ("child") this process derives puqloD ("son") and puqbeʼ ("daughter").

Klingon nouns take suffixes to indicate grammatical number. There are three noun classes, two levels of deixis, and a possession and syntactic function. In all, twenty-nine noun suffixes from five classes may be employed: jupoypuʼnaʼwIʼvaD "for my beloved true friends". A word may carry no more than one suffix from each class, and the classes have a specific order of appearance.

Verbs in Klingon take a prefix indicating the number and person of the subject and object, whereas suffixes are taken from nine ordered classes and a special suffix class called rovers. Each of the four known rovers has a unique rule controlling its position among the suffixes in the verb. Verbs are marked for aspect, certainty, predisposition and volition, dynamic, causative, mood, negation, and honorific. The Klingon verb has two moods: indicative and imperative.

The most common word order in Klingon is object–verb–subject, and, in most cases, the word order is the exact reverse of English for an equivalent sentence:

DaH mojaq-mey-vam DI-vuS-nIS-beʼ ʼeʼ vI-Har
now suffix-PL-DEM 1PL.A.3PL.P-limit-need-NEG that 1SG.A.3SG.P-believe
"I believe that we do not need to limit these suffixes now."

(Hyphens are used in the above only to illustrate the use of affixes. Hyphens are not used in Klingon.)

An important aspect of Klingon grammar is its "ungrammaticality". As with for example Japanese, shortening of communicative statements is common, and is called "Clipped Klingon" (tlhIngan Hol poD or, more simply, Hol poD) and Ritualized Speech. Clipped Klingon is especially useful in situations where speed is a decisive factor. Grammar is abbreviated, and sentence parts deemed to be superfluous are dropped. Intentional ungrammaticality is widespread, and it takes many forms. It is exemplified by the practice of pabHaʼ, which Marc Okrand translates as "to misfollow the rules" or "to follow the rules wrongly".

== Writing systems ==
Qaplaʼ (success)

When written in the Latin alphabet, Klingon is unusual in being case-sensitive, with some letters written in capitals and others in lowercase. When Okrand designed Klingon, he deliberately used capital letters to denote sounds that are not natively found in American English. This was intended to help teach the Star Trek actors how to speak the Klingon language correctly. When actors saw capital letters denoted in the script, they had to pay special attention to them to ensure that they were correctly pronouncing phonemes that they were not natively accustomed to.

For example, q and Q are an actual case-sensitive pair representing two different consonants. Capitals are generally reserved for uvular or retroflex consonants pronounced further back in the mouth or throat than is normal for the corresponding English sounds, as with D, Q, and S. The letter H, pronounced like the ⟨ch⟩ in German "ach" or Scottish "loch", is further forward in the throat than English /h/.

One phoneme, the vowel I, is written capital to look more like the IPA symbol for the sound /ɪ/, and can pose problems when writing Klingon in sans-serif fonts such as Arial, as it looks almost the same as the consonant l. This has led some Klingon enthusiasts to write it lowercase like the other vowels ("i") to prevent confusion, but this use is non-canonical. Instead, a serif font that clearly distinguishes "I" and "l", such as Courier or Courier New, has traditionally been employed for writing Klingon in the Latin alphabet. In any case, it can be disambiguated through context, as I never occurs next to another vowel, while l always does.

The apostrophe, denoting the glottal stop, is considered a letter, not a punctuation mark, as with the ʻokina in the Hawaiian alphabet.

a b ch D e gh H I j l m n ng o p q Q r S t tlh u v w y ʼ

Klingon is often written in (in-universe, "transliterated to") the Latin alphabet as used above, but on the television series, the Klingons use their own alien writing system. In The Klingon Dictionary, this alphabet is named pIqaD, but no information is given about it. When Klingon symbols are used in Star Trek productions, they are merely decorative graphic elements, designed to emulate real writing and create an appropriate atmosphere. Enthusiasts have settled on the name pIqaD for this writing system.

The Astra Image Corporation designed the symbols currently used to "write" Klingon for Star Trek: The Motion Picture, although these symbols are often incorrectly attributed to Michael Okuda. (Note: See: Symbols attributed to Okuda: the Klingon Language Institute's Klingon FAQ (edited by d'Armond Speers), question 2.13 by Will Martin (August 18, 1994).; Symbols incorrectly attributed to Okuda: KLI founder Lawrence M. Schoen's "On Orthography" (PDF), citing J. Lee's "An Interview with Michael Okuda" in the KLI's journal HolQeD 1.1 (March 1992), p. 11.; Symbols actually designed by Astra Image Corporation: Michael Everson's Proposal...^{[3]}) They based the letters on the Klingon battlecruiser hull markings (three letters) first created by Matt Jefferies and on Tibetan writing because the script has sharp letter forms—used as a testament to the Klingons' love for knives and blades.

For April Fools' Day in 2013, Nokia and the typography company Dalton Maag claimed to have used "communication devices to far-flung star systems" to assist them in localizing the Nokia Pure font of the Klingon writing system. Though the explanation was of course humorous in nature, as part of the practical joke, a series of real fonts based upon the most commonly used pIqaD character mapping were in fact developed, and have been made available for free download.

== Vocabulary ==
A design principle of the Klingon language is the great degree of lexical-cultural correlation in the vocabulary. For example, there are several words meaning "to fight" or "to clash against", each having a different degree of intensity. There is an abundance of words relating to warfare and weaponry and also a great variety of curses (cursing is considered a fine art in Klingon culture). This helps lend a particular character to the language.

There are many in-jokes built into the language. For example, the word for "pair" is changʼeng, a reference to the original "Siamese twins" Chang and Eng Bunker; a leSpal is a mid-size stringed instrument, comparable to a guitar (i.e. Les Paul); a "chronometer" is tlhaq (pronounced similar to "clock"); the word for "torture" is joy; "hangover" is ʼuH, and the word for "fish" is ghotIʼ.

Sources for the vocabulary include English (albeit heavily disguised), and also Yiddish: SaʼHut for "buttocks" (from תּחת tuches spelled backwards), and ʼoyʼ for "ache, pain, sore" (cf. oy vey).

Many English words do not have direct translations into Klingon. To express "hello", the nearest equivalent is nuqneH, meaning "What do you want?", with "goodbye" translated as Qaplaʼ, "Success!".

== Example sentences ==
tlhIngan Hol Dajatlhʼaʼ?
Do you speak Klingon?
jIyajbeʼ.
I don't understand.
Dochvetlh vISoplaHbeʼ.
I can't eat that.
bIlughbeʼ.
You are wrong.
bortaS bIr jabluʼDIʼ reH QaQquʼ nayʼ.
Revenge is a dish best served cold. (lit: When cold revenge is served, the dish is always very good)
HeghluʼmeH QaQ jajvam.
Today is a good day to die.

== See also ==
- Stovokor, a death metal band whose lyrics are written in Klingon

== Bibliography ==
- Bernard Comrie, 1995, "The Paleo-Klingon numeral system". HolQeD 4.4: 6–10.
- Klingon ConScript Unicode Registry (CSUR) Archived 2011-06-29 at the Wayback Machine
- pIqaD Support Archived 2020-08-28 at the Wayback Machine
- Klingon (pIqaD) Unicode font Archived 2017-10-11 at the Wayback Machine (U+F8D0–U+F8FF)
- Klingon text converter (transliteration)
