= Artisphere =

Defunct arts center in Arlington, Virginia

Coordinates: 38.8951°N 77.069955°W

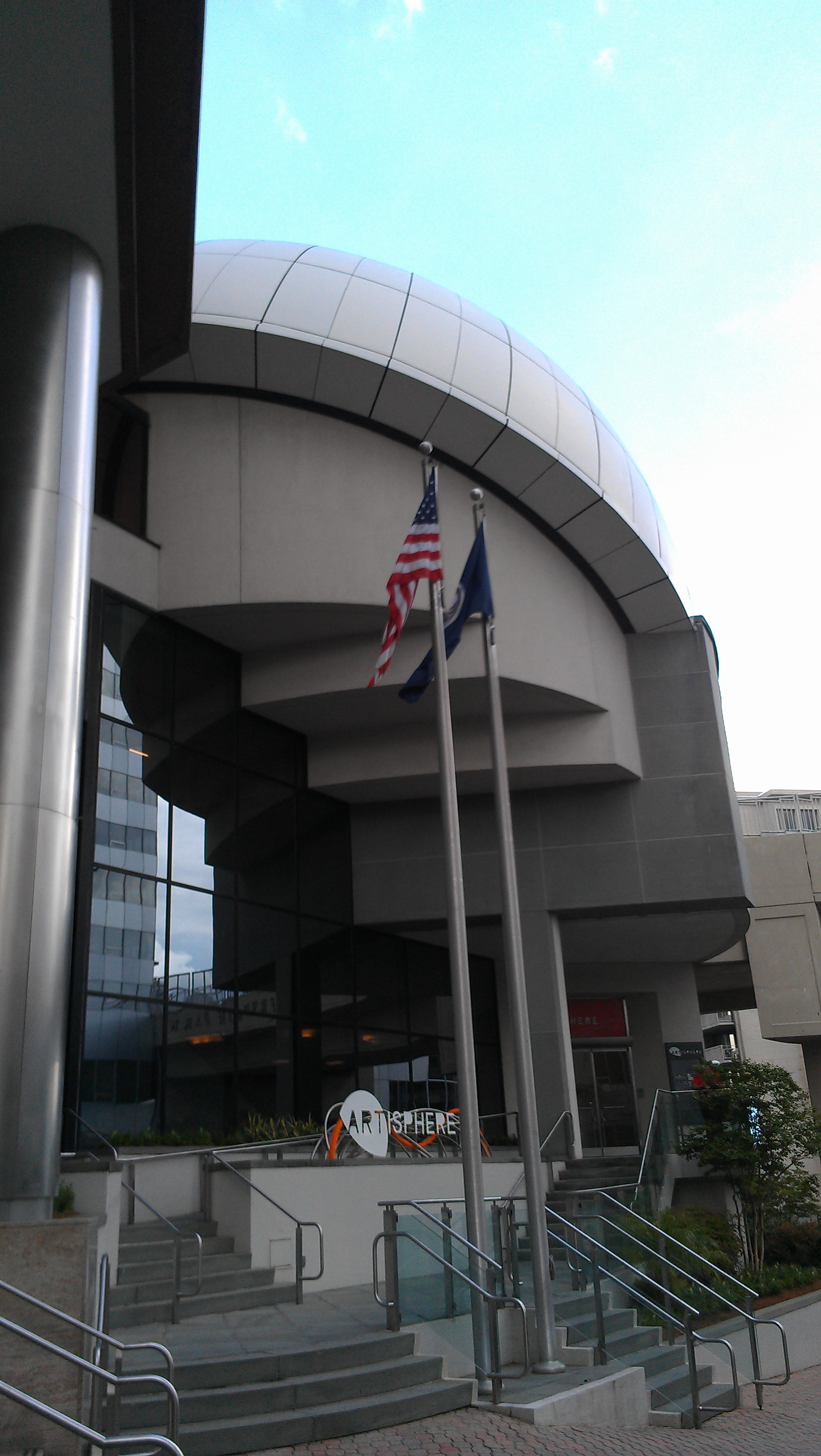
The Artisphere in Arlington County, Virginia

Artisphere was an arts center located in the Rosslyn section of Arlington County, Virginia. The center encompassed four performance venues, three visual art galleries, an artist in residence studio, a 4,000 square foot ballroom, studio space, social gathering spots, food service facilities, a bar and lounge area as well as outdoor terraces. Programming includes visual art, theatre, live music, film, new media, family programs, dance, conferences and private events.

The Artisphere campus included the main building at 1101 Wilson Boulevard and the nearby Spectrum Theatre at 1611 N. Kent Street. The main building is recognizable for a large dome shaped architectural feature. The Spectrum Theatre is situated on the ground floor of the mixed use Rosslyn Plaza complex.

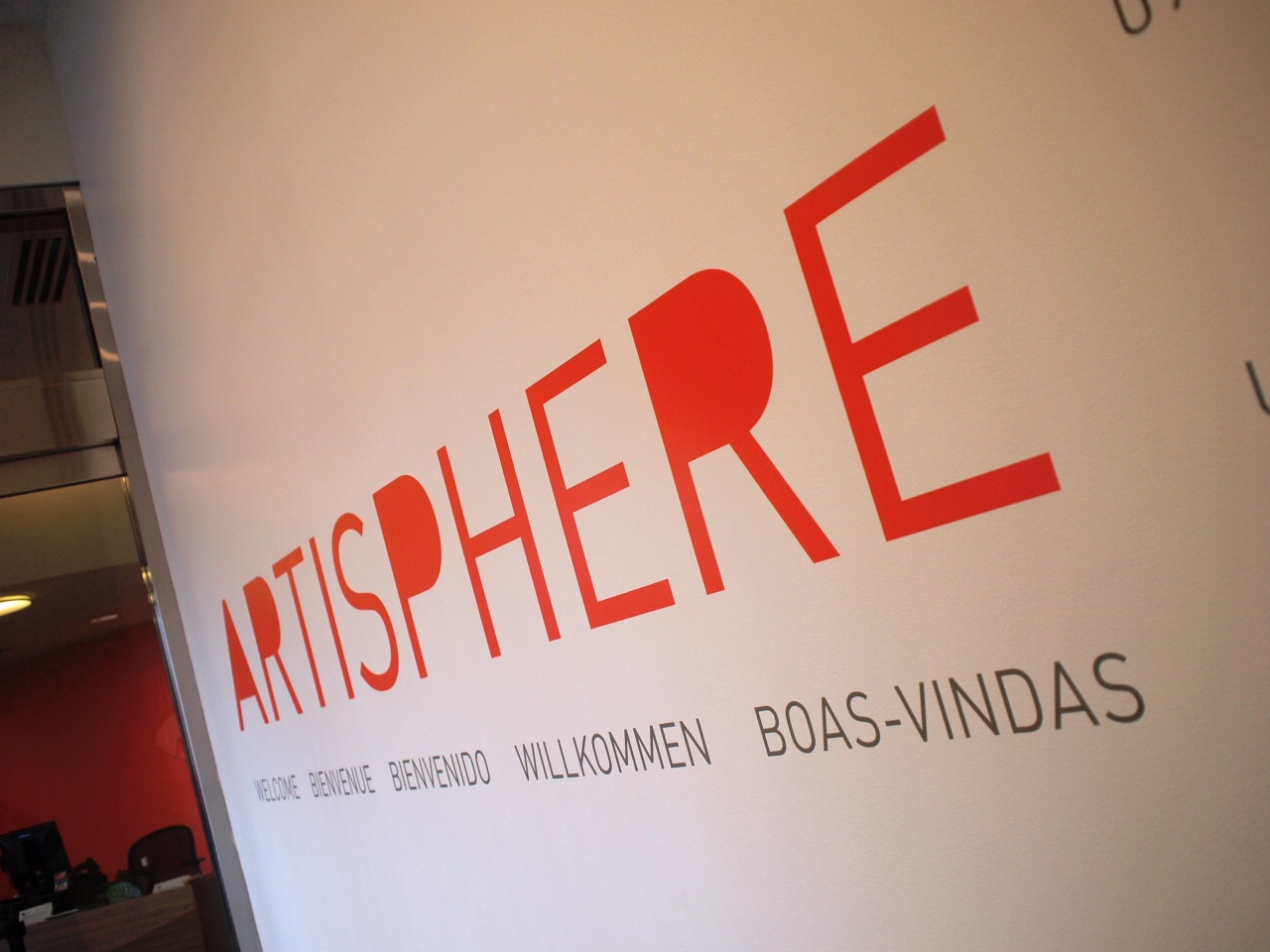
One of the signs on the outside of the Artisphere building

== History ==
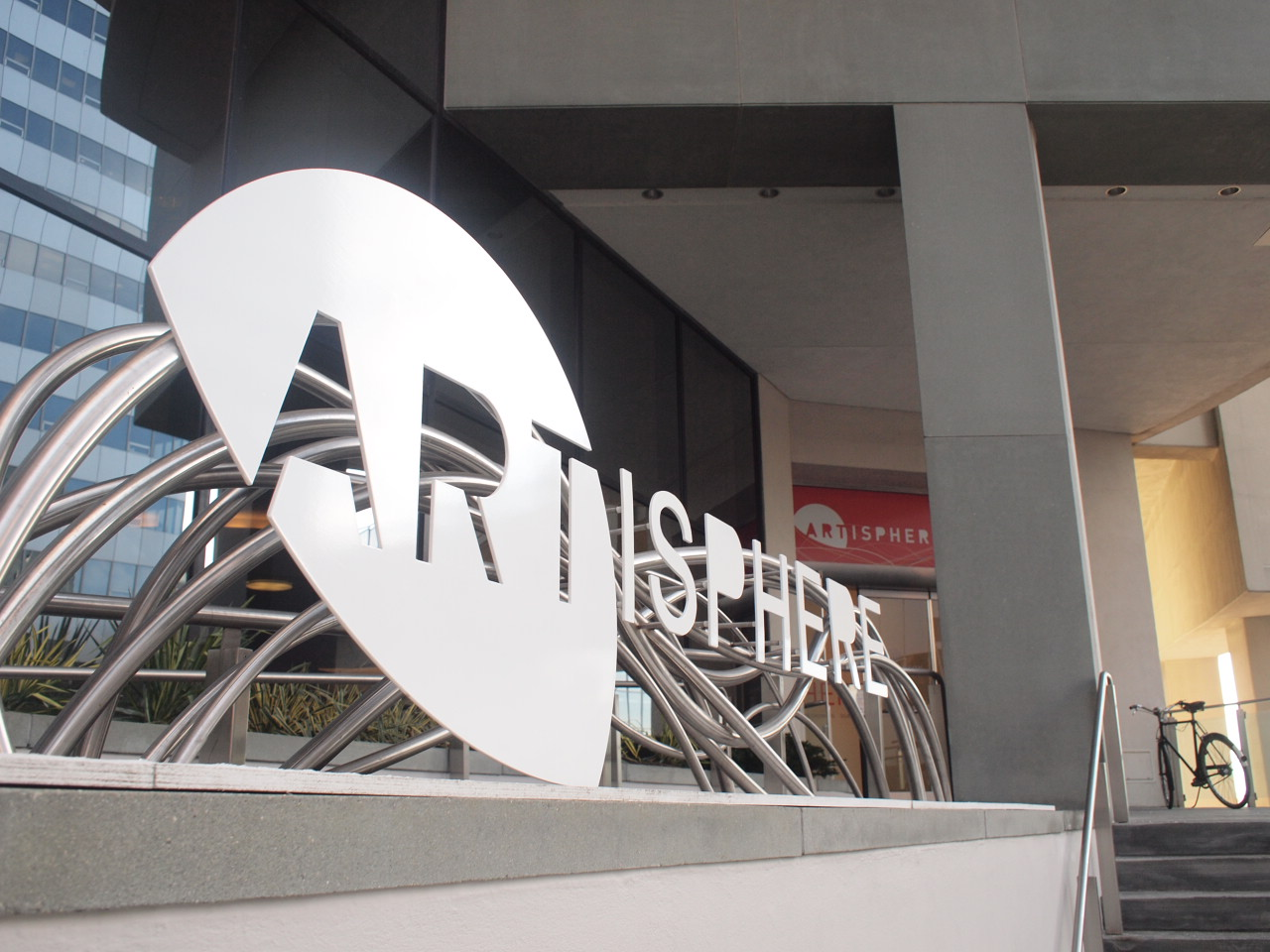
The Artisphere sign at its entrance

The Cultural Affairs Division of Arlington County, Virginia originated the institution, which opened in October 2010. Previously, the main building housed the Newseum. The Spectrum was originally built as a cinema.

The Newseum opened in 1997 and attracted 2.25 million visitors before closing in 2002 to move to a larger venue in Washington, D.C. After the Newseum vacated the Rosslyn space in 2003, multiple groups considered using the space as a museum. In 2007, the space hosted the controversial Bodies: The Exhibition exhibit. At that time, the space was known as The Dome. In 2009, Arlington County accepted the landlord's offer to lease the space to the county rent free for 20 years for use as a cultural center. The lease was offered in conjunction with the site plan for a new skyscraper, also located in Rosslyn.

The Spectrum Theatre was originally built in the late 1960s. Then known as the Rosslyn Plaza Theater, it showed motion pictures. Arlington County eventually took over operation of the space and renamed it Rosslyn Spectrum. In 2004, it hosted the popular Broadway show Defending the Caveman. Due to the show's popularity it was held over through April 2005. Later that decade, it was home to Synetic Theater until Synetic moved to Arlington's Crystal City neighborhood in 2010 The Spectrum was incorporated into Artisphere later in 2010 and is now known as Spectrum Theatre at Artisphere.

Arlington County had sought a cultural center for decades. The cost to build a center from the ground up was estimated at $50 million. The 62,000 sq ft (5,800 m^{2}) Artisphere facility was converted at a cost of $6.7 million.

The center's name was selected from among those proposed by an opinion poll of Arlington residents. The name is inspired by the geodesic dome that houses one of the theaters. In October 2010, Artisphere hosted multiple opening events including a party titled Burst! The event, which was sponsored by Brightest Young Things and The Pink Line Project, celebrated the launch of Artisphere and featured music, performances, video art, and visual art. One of the attractions was balloon artist Katie Balloons who was filmed by cable television channel TLC for a reality show which featured the Burst! event.

After the first year of operation, the center received mixed reviews. While it was voted the 2011 Best Arts Center in the Washington Post Express Readers’ Poll and Best New Venue in the Washington City Paper Readers’ Poll, the county determined that first year revenue and attendance expectations had not been met. In response, a task force was formed to create a new business plan for the center. The plan, implemented in 2012, included reduced operating hours and programming updates. Artisphere closed at the end of June 2015 after the Arlington County Board voted to not support Artisphere for the next fiscal year.

== Programming ==
Building on the success of sold out performances in 2011 featuring musical acts Bluebrain and Dar Williams, the updated programming included world music performances. Concerts by Haitian musician BelO, Brazilian samba singer Diogo Nogueira and Mexican American alternative rock musician Rana Santacruz sold out in the first two months of 2012.

The WSC Avant Bard performing arts organization (formerly the Washington Shakespeare Company) staged several theatrical productions each year in the Black Box theatre. Performances at Artisphere included modern adaptations of plays by William Shakespeare, Albert Camus and Tennessee Williams. WSC Avant Bard gained international attention when it staged a night of Shakespeare partially performed in the Klingon language with actor George Takei from the original Star Trek TV series. The BBC filmed a subsequent performance with its own Stephen Fry and used footage in a documentary series about language. WSC Avant Bard continues to perform in Klingon on rare occasions.

The National Chamber Ensemble performed original and classical chamber music at the Spectrum Theatre at Artisphere. UrbanArias, an opera company that produces short contemporary operas, performed in the Black Box Theatre. The ballroom was used for salsa, swing and social dancing.

The three galleries in Artisphere (Terrace, WIP {Works in Progress}, Mezz Gallery, along with the Artist in Residence Studio hosted various types of art exhibits focused on topics including political cartoons, collaborative exhibitions with outside groups such as the Washington Project for the Arts, Washington Sculpture Group focussing on sustainability and interactive media paintings, sketches, sculpture, photography, video, audio, collage and other media. The Mezz Gallery was dedicated to showcasing the work of Artists who live, work or have a studio in Arlington County, VA. The Terrace and WIP galleries exhibited contemporary work by local national and international artists. These galleries and related programs were overseen by Visual Arts Curator Cynthia Connolly, Education Director Lisa Marie Thalhammer and New Media Curator Ryan Holladay. The programming brought to Arlington encompassed local, national and international artists.

== Facilities ==
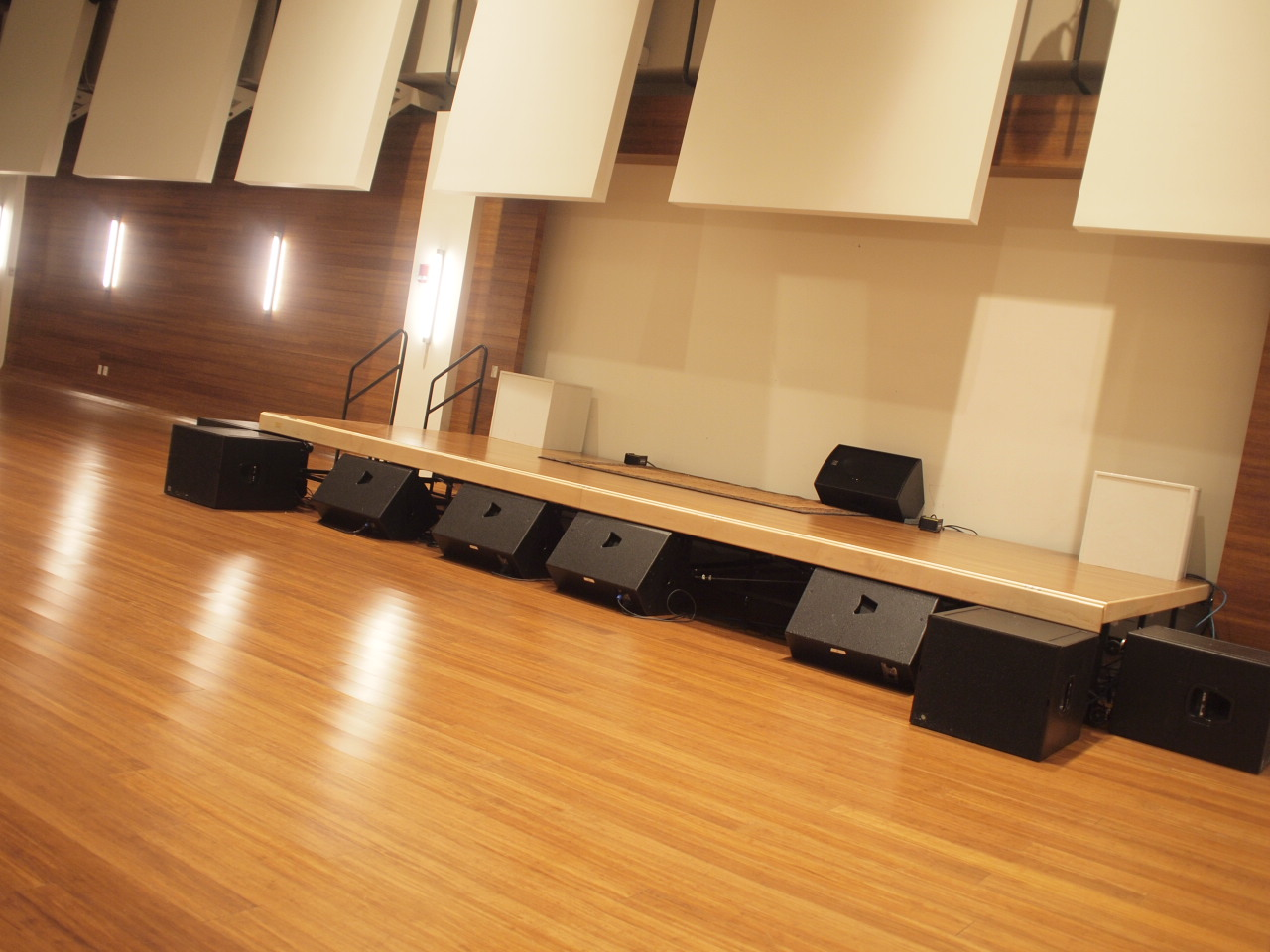
A stage inside Artisphere's ballroom

The specific facilities included:

- 220-seat Dome Theatre, for concerts and films
- 4,000 sq ft (370 m^{2}) Terrace Gallery, for art exhibits
- WiFi Town Square, with a two-story high video wall
- 3,000 sq ft (280 m^{2}) Ballroom
- 125-seat black box theatre
- 387-seat Spectrum Theatre
- retail space for selling crafts

== Operation ==
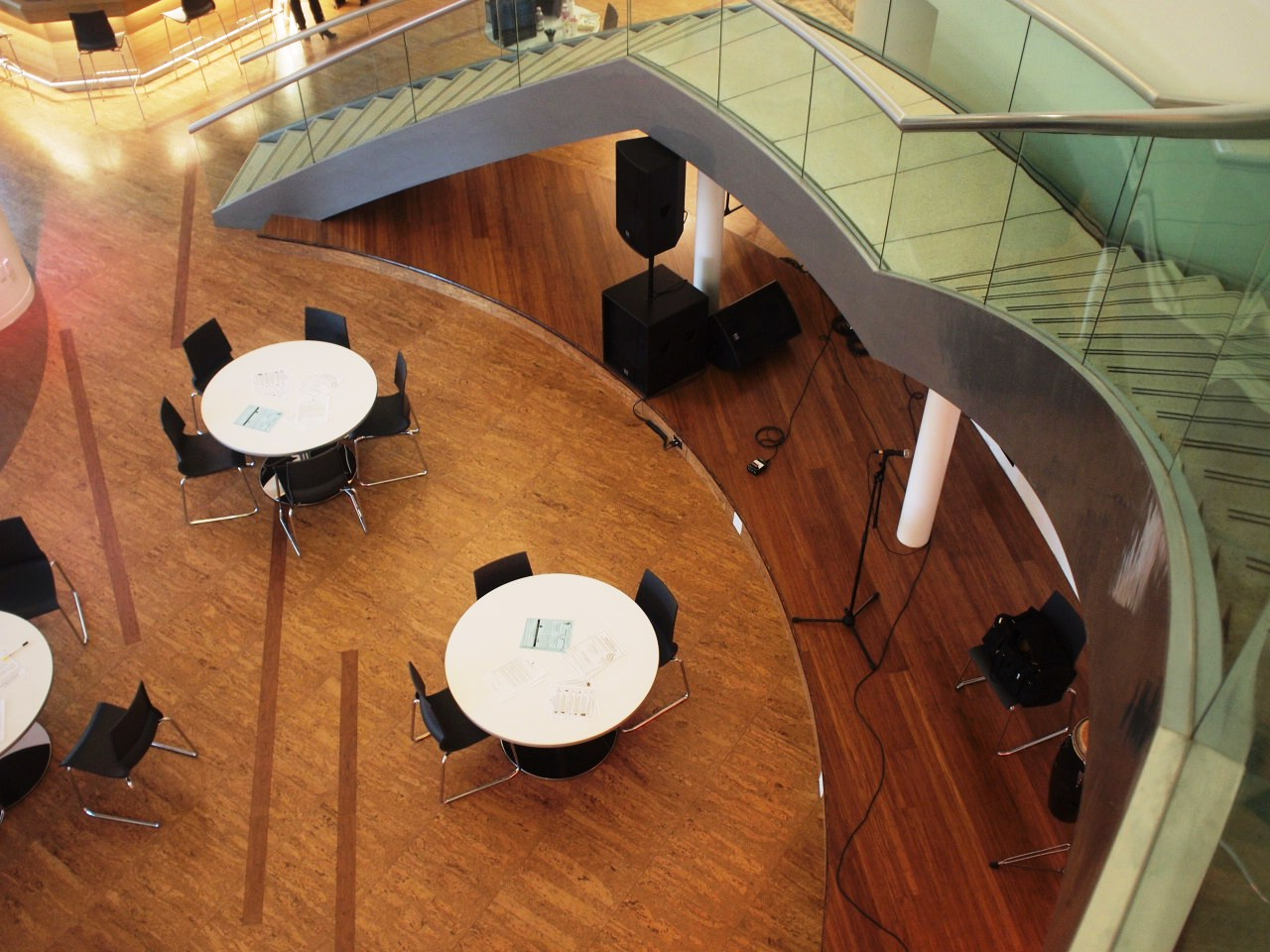
Tables inside a lounge area within the Artisphere

Artisphere had an annual operating budget of $3.1 million, of which $300,000 was funded by the Rosslyn Business Improvement District. Programming included serving as the home of the WSC Avant Bard performing arts organization, Bowen McCauley Dance Company and the National Chamber Ensemble.
