= A Klingon Christmas Carol =

Klingon adaptation of the story from Charles Dickens

- Photoshop-embossed poster Art for 2009 (MN) and 2012 (IL) productions of A Klingon Christmas Carol
- Original language: Klingon
- Written by: Christopher Kidder-Mostrom; Sasha Warren; Translation by Laura Thurston; Bill Hedrick; Christopher Kidder-Mostrom; Chris Lipscombe
- Characters: see below
- Subject: A Christmas Carol by Charles Dickens
- Genre: play, parody

Premiere
- Date: December 8, 2007
- Place: Saint Paul, Minnesota

A Klingon Christmas Carol is the first play to be performed entirely in Klingon, a constructed language first appearing in the Star Trek media franchise. The play is based on the Charles Dickens 1843 novella, A Christmas Carol. A Klingon Christmas Carol is the Charles Dickens classic tale of ghosts and redemption, adapted to reflect the Klingon values of courage and honor, and then translated into Klingon, performed with English supertitles.

Originally created as a fundraiser for Commedia Beauregard theatre company, it was written in 2007 by Christopher Kidder-Mostrom and Sasha Warren and was originally translated by Laura Thurston, Bill Hedrick and Christopher Kidder-Mostrom. Additional content and translations were provided by Chris Lipscombe when the show was expanded in 2010.

Commedia Beauregard produced the play from 2007 to 2010 in Minnesota and in Chicago from 2010 to 2014. The play has also been presented in Cincinnati in 2013, Washington, D.C. in 2014, and Simi Valley, California in 2017. Additionally, the play returned to Minnesota in 2014 and returned to Chicago in 2016.

== Synopsis ==
=== Act I ===
The play opens in a classroom; a member of the Vulcan Institute of Cultural Anthropology begins a comparative lecture on Charles Dickens' A Christmas Carol and its Klingon counterpart tlhIngan ram nI' bom (Klingon Long Night's Song). The Vulcan Narrator is assisted by members of the Imperial Klingon Players, who proceed to act out the play. SQuja', a Klingon money lender, demonstrates a lack of courage and honor - refusing to participate in the "Year Games" and to provide assistance to the sons and daughters of fallen warriors. He is visited first by his deceased partner, marlI', who tells him that he will be visited by three spirits; these will prevent him from sharing marlI's fate of fighting without end and without glory. The first spirit to arrive - ben qeylIS qa' (Ghost of Kahless Past) takes him on a journey through his history - first at his school, then at the party of his former employer (veSIwIq) and finally to a moment shared with his former mate, bel. He is returned to his quarters and anxiously awaits the arrival of the next spirit.

=== Act II ===
Act II begins at the same moment Act I ended - with an off-stage voice (Ghost of Kahless Present) yelling SQuja's name. This spirit, DaHjaj qeylIS qa', bids SQuja' drink from the cup of Klingon courage and then shows him what is happening in his current time. They visit the meager feast of SQuja's assistant, QachIt, and his family - including tImHom, QachIt's son, who is crippled and unlikely to pass his Age of Ascension ritual without dying. Next SQuja' and the spirit attend the party of vreD (SQuja's nephew), which consists of a training tournament. Lastly, DaHjaj qeylIS qa' introduces SQuja' to quvHa'ghach (Corruption) and SaHHa'ghach (Apathy) - which spell doom for the Empire - before disappearing. He is replaced by the last spirit, pIq qeylIS qa' (Ghost of Kahless Yet-to-Come). This silent spirit shows SQuja' scenes of what may be - including the death of tImHom - before leaving SQuja' alone in an unfamiliar and unfriendly place. A parade of dead warriors make their way to what SQuja' assumes to be Sto-vo-kor (the Klingon Heaven) while SQuja' realizes the error of his dishonorable ways. SQuja' wakes up in his own bed, elated at the change within himself and proceeds to correct his previous indiscretions, including visits first to vreD and finally to the home of QachIt and tImHom.

== Inception and development ==
Commedia Beauregard, a theatre company whose mission is "to translate the universal human experience to the stage: to expand our horizons and share knowledge of all cultures, translating between languages and between arts to create theater that is beautiful in expression", created A Klingon Christmas Carol as a fundraising event in 2007. The idea was originally a joke, but was ultimately developed into a serious play. Christopher Kidder-Mostrom and Sasha Warren wrote a new script, based on the Dickens classic. Translations and other assistance for the first production were provided by local Twin Cities Klingon fan groups.

After receiving favorable reviews, the play expanded its Twin Cities production to two performances in 2008 and a three-week (12 night) run in 2009 (at the Paul & Sheila Wellstone Center and Mixed Blood Theater, respectively). The 2009 production featured a script with Klingon-language revisions by Chris Lipscombe, a member of the Klingon Language Institute.

In 2010, A Klingon Christmas Carol was further expanded and revised by Kidder-Mostrom. Scenes originally absent from the play, including the children under the Ghost of Kahless Present's robe (named "Apathy" and "Corruption", in contrast to "Ignorance" and "Want" from the Dickens original) and Huch qoy'wI' (literally "one who begs for money") requesting assistance for the sons and daughters of fallen warriors, were added to the script. Also, new sections of narration provided transition for the scenes involving the Ghost of Khaless Yet-to-Come. Marc Okrand, creator of the Klingon language, reviewed the script in this year and introduced new words - including quvHa'ghach (corruption) and SaHHa'ghach (apathy) - which were needed for the play. Chris Lipscombe made further revisions, improving the Klingon translation.

== Productions ==
=== Premiere ===
Bat'leth fight from premiere production of A Klingon Christmas Carol in 2007 with Brian Watson-Jones as vred (left) and Scot Moore as Warrior 2 (right). Commedia Beauregard file photo.

The play was first produced in December 2007 at the University of Minnesota Saint Paul Student Center in Saint Paul, Minnesota. A one-night-only event that also included a gala banquet and charitable auction, the night sold-out and was a success far beyond Commedia Beauregard's expectations.

The cast was:

- Narrator - Nathaniel Churchill
- SQuja' (Scrooge) - Michael Ooms
- QachIt (Bob Cratchit) - Christopher Kidder-Mostrom
- 'emlI' (Mrs. Cratchit) - Jen Rand
- marDa' (Martha Cratchit) - Erin Haynes
- tImHom (Tiny Tim) - Himself (Operated by Scot Moore)
- vreD (Fred) - Brian Watson-Jones
- marja' (Mrs. Fred) - Laura Thurston
- marlI' (Jacob Marley) - Bill Hedrick
- Ghost of Kahless Past (Christmas Past) - Brian O'Neal
- Ghost of Kahless Present - Rob Withoff
- Ghost of Kahless Yet-To-Come - Laura Thurston
- qe'pa (a youth) - Brian Watson-Jones
- Qob (a youth) - Christopher Kidder-Mostrom
- Young SQuja' (Young Scrooge) - Scot Moore
- van (Fannie) - Jen Rand
- veSIwIq (Fezziwig) - Bill Hedrick
- wIlqInS (Dick Wilkins) - John Gregory
- bel (Belle) - Erin Haynes
- Weapon Merchant - Rob Withoff
- Seller - John Gregory
- Boy - Andrew Northrop
- Warriors - Andrew Northrop, Scot Moore, Jen Rand, Erin Haynes
- Guests - Brian O'Neal, Andrew Northrop, Bill Hedrick

=== Minnesota ===
2007 to 2010 by Commedia Beauregard

2014 by The Arts' Nest

2015 to 2018 by The Historic Mounds Theatre

=== Chicago, Illinois ===
2010 to 2014 by Commedia Beauregard
2016 to 2018 by E.D.G.E. Theatre

=== Cincinnati, Ohio ===
2013 by Hugo West Theatricals

=== Washington, D.C. ===
2014 by WSC Avant Bard

=== Simi Valley, California ===
2017 by Lit Live

=== Seattle, Washington ===
2025 by Latitude Theatre

== Characters ==
- Narrator (a Vulcan)
- SQuja' (Scrooge)
- QachIt (Bob Cratchit)
- vreD (Fred, Scrooge's nephew)
- Huch qoy'wI' 1 and 2 (Charity Men)
- marlI' (Jacob Marley)
- ben qeylIS qa' (Ghost of Kahless Past)
- Qe'pa (a youth, Scrooge's schoolmate)
- Qob (a youth, Scrooge's schoolmate)
- SQujsa' Up (Young Scrooge)
- Van (Fannie, Scrooge's sister)
- veSIwIq (Fezziwig, Scrooge's employer)
- wIlqInS (Dick Wilkins, Scrooge's co-worker/Fezziwig's employee)
- bel (Belle)
- DaHjaj qeylIS qa' (Ghost of Kahless Present)
- 'emlI' (Mrs. Cratchit)
- marDa' (Martha Cratchit)
- tImHom (Tiny Tim)
- mara' (Mrs. Fred)
- meb (Guest) 1, 2 and 3
- quvHa'ghach (Corruption)
- SaHHa'ghach (Apathy)
- pIq qeylIS qa' (Ghost of Kahless Yet-To-Come)
- SuvwI' (Warrior) 1, 2 and 3
- Suy (Weapon Merchant)
- ngevwI' (Seller)
- loDHom (Boy)

== Production design ==
=== Design history ===
The original 2007 production of A Klingon Christmas Carol was designed by Derek Sandbeck (sound), Forest Godfrey (lights and projections), Laura Wilhelm (puppetry), Christopher Kidder-Mostrom (set) and Erin Haynes (costumes), with make-up and prosthetics by Bill Hedrick & Rob Withoff. In 2010, a new set of costumes was commissioned, designed by Jeff Stolz. These costumes were also used for the first Cincinnati production, in 2013. A new puppet was designed and constructed for the first Chicago production by Kat Pleviak, of Sea Beast Puppet Company.

Beginning with the original production in 2007, the production design for A Klingon Christmas Carol included costumes reminiscent of medieval Earth and a very minimal set construction. Commedia Beauregard reinvented the production design for their 2013 production with costumes that had a more Victorian feel (by kClare Kemock) and a multi-level set design (by Ian Mostrom).

=== Sound design ===
Sound design for the premiere production was provided by Derek Sandbeck. In 2010, a musical score for the play was commissioned for the first time. This score was composed by Mike Hallenbeck and used in the Minnesota and Chicago Productions. In 2011, a new score was commissioned and composed by Jon Silpayamanant. This score was used for the 2011 and 2012 Chicago productions, the 2013 Hugo West Theatricals production in Cincinnati, OH, and the 2014 WSC Avant Bard production in Washington D.C. Sound design and original music for the reimagined 2013 and final 2014 Commedia Beauregard Chicago productions and the 2014 The Arts' Nest production in Minnesota was provided by Joe Griffin, of Toxic Bag Productions.

== Recordings and publication ==
The script of A Klingon Christmas Carol was first published in February 2014 by Commedia Beauregard. This hardcover edition contained side-by-side English and Klingon texts, as well as author and translator notes.

DVD recordings of the 2010 and 2012 Commedia Beauregard productions were created, with video recording and production by Audio/Video Logistics Sound & Film Works. The first commissioned musical score by Mike Hallenbeck is heard on the 2010 DVD and the second commissioned score by Jon Silpayamanant and his ensemble, bomwI'pu' (The il Troubadore Klingon Music Project) is heard on the 2012 DVD.

A CD recording of the third commissioned musical score by Joe Griffin was released by Commedia Beauregard in 2014. The musical scores by Jon Silpayamanant and Joe Griffin are official scores and exist for use in productions.

== See also ==
- Adaptations of A Christmas Carol
