= Michelle Lisa Herman =

American artist

Michelle Lisa Herman (born 1985) is an American contemporary and conceptual artist who works with sculpture, video, installation, and painting. Herman's work draws on theoretical and philosophical research, feminist and disability politics, comedy, and conceptualism and investigates ideas of agency and invisible systems of power in technologically mediated society. Herman is currently based in Washington, DC.

== Early life and education ==
Herman was born in Huntington, New York, and received her MFA from the Maryland Institute College of Art in 2020 and a BFA from the Maryland Institute College of Art in 2008.

in 2004, Herman worked for Haitian-American Artist Eduoard Duval-Carrie and served as collaborator on "The Indigo Room" permanent installation at the Fort Lauderdale Museum of Art.

In 2009, Herman served as a studio assistant for renowned sculptor Maren Hassinger.

== Career ==
Herman has been exhibited at the Smithsonian, The John F. Kennedy Center for the Performing Arts, John F. Kennedy Center for the Performing Arts, the Phillips Collection, The Walters Art Museum, Corcoran Gallery of Art, the National Building Museum, the Maryland Institute College of Art, Artisphere, Visarts, and DC Arts Center.

Herman's work has been featured in national publications such as The Washington Post, New American Paintings, and Hyperallergic as well as regional publications such as East City Art. Herman's work sits in numerous public and private collections such as the DC Commission on the Arts and Humanities and the New Museum's Rhizome Artbase.

== Commissions ==
In 2015, Herman was commissioned by the Washington Project for the Arts to create an interactive installation entitled Mirror Mirror for the WPA's 40th Anniversary exhibition Washington Produced Artists. Herman worked with several well-known DC writers and artists for the video portion including E. Ethelbert Miller, Linda Hesh, Patrick McDonough, Barbara Liotta, and Michael Platt.

Washington Produced Artists was curated by Laura Roulet and also included the work of notable DC artists such as William Christenberry, Jim Sanborn, Joyce J. Scott, Dan Steinhilber, the Workingman Collective, and Maida Withers.

== Selected exhibitions ==
=== Solo ===
- Michelle Lisa Herman: Always, Already?, Rockville, MD
- Michelle Lisa Herman: Inter-Net, Washington, D.C.
- Michelle Lisa Herman: I Just Want to Know You're There, Washington, D.C.

=== Invitational ===
- Interact + Integrate, Visarts, Rockville, MD
- Click Here, Arlington Art Center, Arlington, VA
- Washington Produced Artists, Washington Project for the Arts, Washington, D.C.
- Zeitgeist III: Too Much Information, DC Arts Center, Washington, D.C.
- Revealing Culture, Smithsonian Institution, Washington, D.C.

=== Juried ===
- Experimental Media Series, Artisphere, Arlington, VA
- The Video Show: International Juried Video Exhibition, Branchburg, NJ
- Repeat Respond React, Walters Art Museum, Baltimore, MD

== Public speaking ==
- 2012 Artist lecture and panel discussion at the National Academy of Arts and Sciences
- 2009 Visiting Artist at Brigham Young University in Provo, UT

== Honors and awards ==
- 2020 WPA and Warhol Foundation Wherewithal Research Grant
- 2019 DC Commission on the Arts and Humanities Artist Fellowship Award
- 2018 DC Commission on the Arts and Humanities Artist Fellowship Award
- 2008 Award of Excellence for Green Light exhibition at the Smithsonian Institution's S. Dillon Ripley Center
