= Lillian J. Huff =

Lillian J. Huff (May 2, 1931 – September 17, 2018) was an American political and community activist in Washington, D.C.

== Biography ==
Lillian J. Huff was born in 1931, in Dooling, Georgia, and raised in Tampa, Florida.

She attended Howard University in Washington, D.C., graduating in 1953. After her graduation, she remained in D.C., where she became a local community activist in the early 1960s and beyond, in particular in her neighborhood of Riggs Park. She served as president of the Lamond-Riggs Citizens Association.

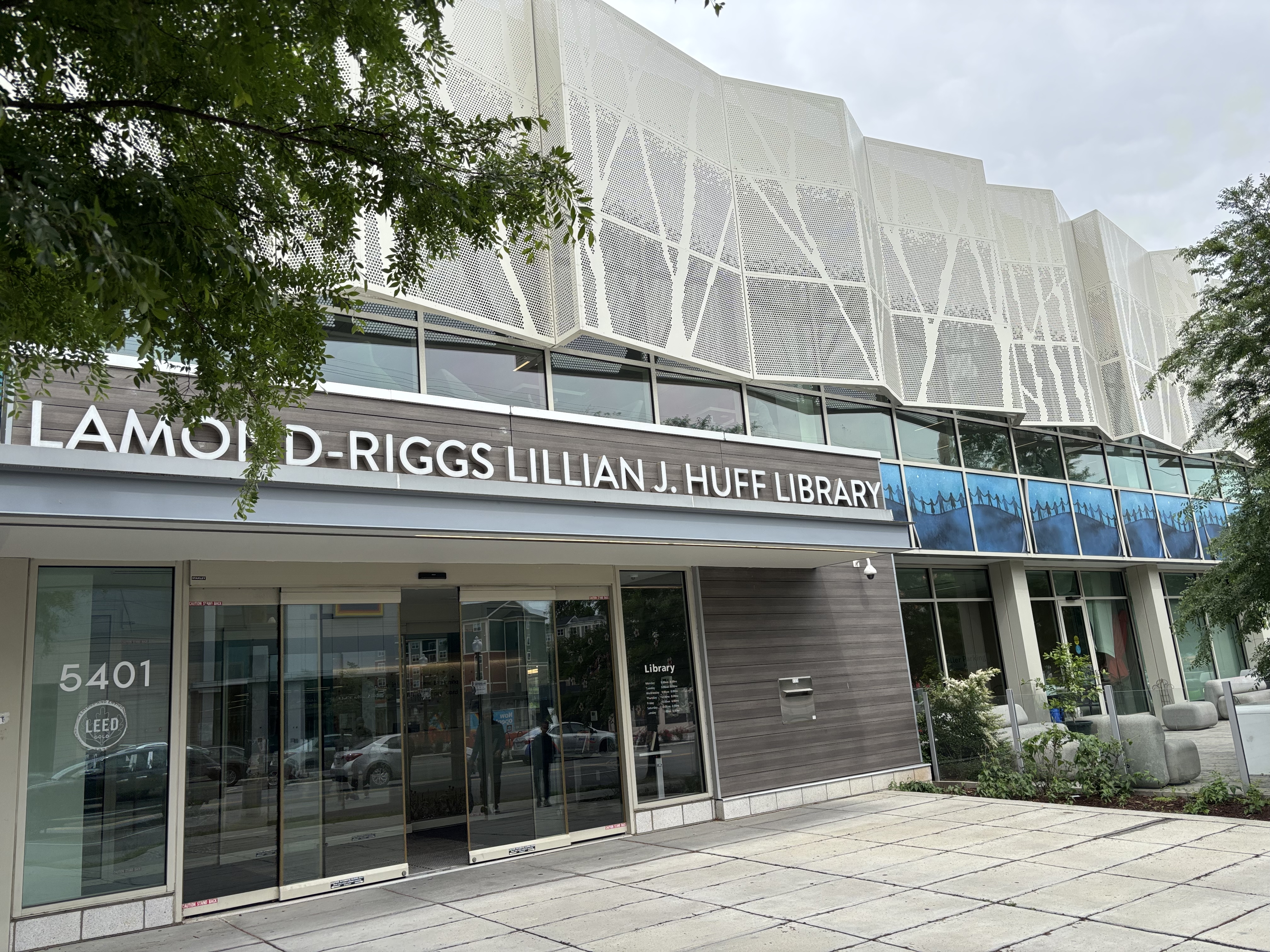
The rebuilt Lamond-Riggs/Lillian J. Huff Neighborhood Library, named in Huff's honor, in Washington, D.C., in 2026.

Huff was also involved in Democratic Party politics, including as co-chair of Walter Washington's mayoral campaign in 1978. While Washington was in office, she chaired his Commission on Food, Nutrition, and Health. She also served as a delegate to the 1972 Democratic National Convention, was the founding president of the D.C. Federation of Democratic Women, and was involved in the push for D.C. home rule and statehood.

She was particularly active in advocating for the District of Columbia Public Library system, including for its expansion to her neighborhood, through local and citywide Friends groups. In 1983, the Lamond-Riggs Library opened in Riggs Park in large part due to Huff's nearly two decades of activism on the issue, which included lobbying Congress to provide funds for the branch. She also served on the White House Conference on Libraries and Information Services under President Jimmy Carter.

Huff died in 2018 at age 87. In 2022, after the Lamond-Riggs branch was replaced with a $20 million new building, it was renamed the Lamond-Riggs/Lillian J. Huff Neighborhood Library in her honor.
