= Avant Bard Theatre =

Non-equity theater

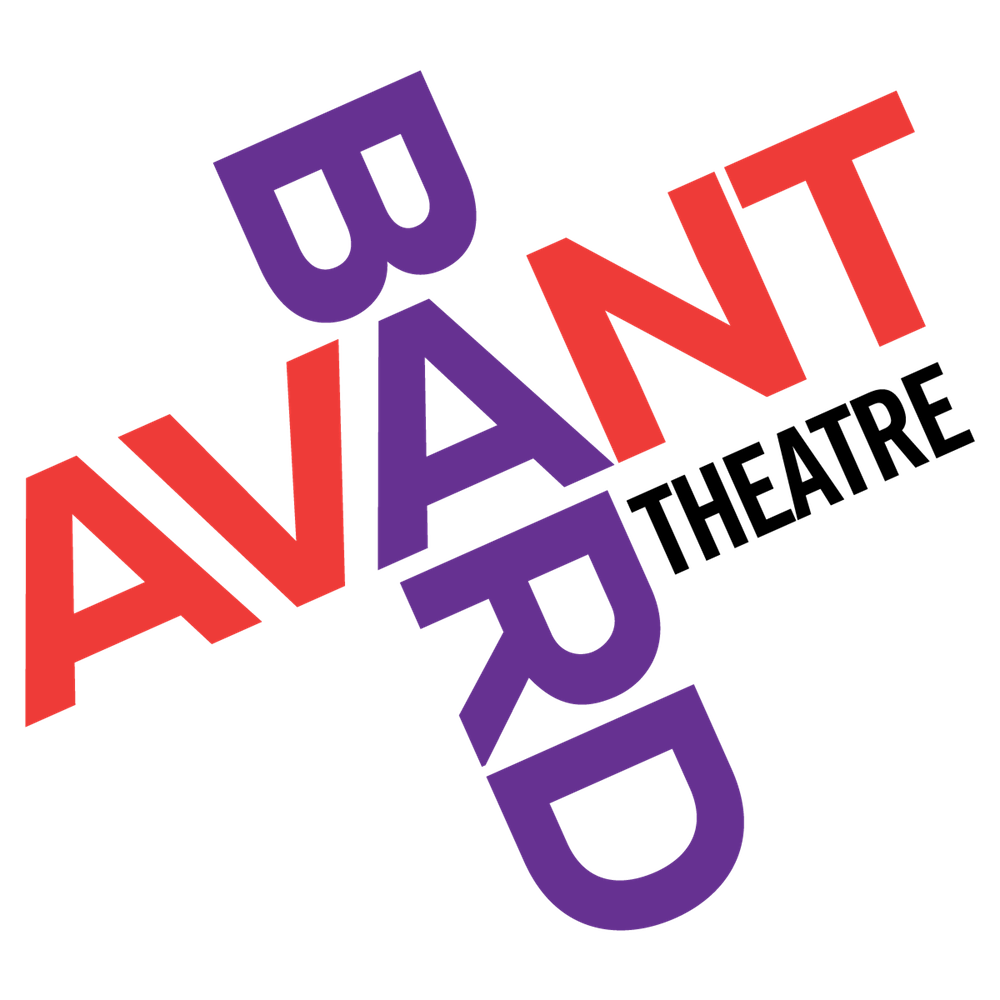
- Company logo
- Formation: 1990
- Type: Theatre group
- Purpose: Interrogating the classics.
- Location: Arlington, VA
- Members: Alyssa Sanders, Artistic Associate for Management; Kathleen Akerley, Artistic Associate for Production & Education
- Artistic director: Sara Barker
- Website: www.avantbard.org

Avant Bard Theatre (commonly known as Avant Bard, and formerly known as WSC Avant Bard, Washington Shakespeare Company or simply WSC) is a small, professional, nonprofit theater based in Arlington, VA. The company was founded in 1990 under the name Washington Shakespeare Company; its name was changed to WSC Avant Bard in August 2011; its name was subsequently changed to Avant Bard Theatre in October 2017. Avant Bard focuses on producing "bold and experimental productions of classic and contemporary works".

== History ==
Avant Bard began as an Arlington (County) Arts Incubator project in 1990, along with Signature Theatre, New Works Theatre, and Goosebump Theatre. The company's inaugural production, a sold-out run of Jean-Paul Sartre's No Exit in September 1990, was also the inaugural production in the Gunston Arts Center, a former junior high school library which had just been renovated as a performing arts center by the Arlington Department of Parks, Recreation and Community Resources.

The company performed in the Clark Street Playhouse, an abandoned warehouse converted into a black box theater, from 1995 until the end of the 2009–2010 season, when the building was scheduled for demolition to make way for development on the north end of Crystal City. (The demolition of the theater had been "imminent" as early as the 2005–2006 season, but the closure of the building was postponed from year to year.) In the fall of 2010, Avant Bard became the theater-in-residence in Arlington's Artisphere, the former site of the Newseum; however, the company was evicted in December, 2012, in the middle of the 2012–2013 season, when Artisphere decided to restructure the use of its facilities. Since then, the company has staged productions in a number of DC venues, including Theatre on the Run, managed by the Arlington (County) Cultural Affairs Division; the Callan Theatre on the campus of the Catholic University of America; and the Gilbert C. Eastman Studio Theatre on the campus of Gallaudet University.

Avant Bard has had four artistic directors. The first, Brian Hemmingsen, was artistic director from 1990 until 1996. Christopher Henley, who was also one of the founding members of the company, was artistic director from 1996 until February 2013. Tom Prewitt was artistic director from February 2013 until his passing in November 2020. The first play which Prewitt directed as artistic director was Pinter's No Man's Land, with Hemmingsen and Henley in the lead roles (Hirst and Spooner, respectively). In February 2021, Avant Bard formed a collaborative leadership team of five producing partners: Sara Barker, Megan Behm, Alyssa Sanders, DeMone Seraphin, and Dina Soltan. In August 2023, the collaborative leadership team changed to three producing partners: Sara Barker, Alyssa Sanders, and Kathleen Akerley. In August 2024, Sara Barker became Avant Bard's Artistic Director, Alyssa Sanders became Artistic Associate - Management, and Kathleen Akerley became Artistic Associate - Production & Education.

== Notable productions ==
Over the course of several months in 2005, the company presented Bard-37: Our Canon Cabaret as a celebration of the company's fifteenth season. Each of Shakespeare's plays was given a reading, in chronological order. Portions of Hamlet were read in Klingon, the first of Avant Bard's forays into presenting Shakespeare "in the original language."

In July/August, 2005, Steven Scott Mazzola directed a production of Royal Hunt for the Sun, by Peter Shaffer.

In February, 2006, John Vreeke directed a production of Death and the King's Horseman, by Nigerian playwright and author Wole Soyinka.

In July, 2007, Jose Carrasquillo directed a version of Macbeth performed entirely in the nude. Critical reviews were mixed, but the production drew national attention: according to USA Today, the production drew some of the company's largest audiences, and the run was extended.

In November, 2012, Tom Prewitt (shortly before being named artistic director) directed a production of Six Characters in Search of an Author, by Luigi Pirandello. The production featured Brian Hemmingsen, the company's founding director, in the role of the Father.

In October/November, 2014, Tom Prewitt directed the world premier of Visible Language, a musical with book and lyrics by Mary Resing, and music by Andy Welchel. Musical direction was by Elisa Rosman, and Aaron Kubey was Director of Artistic Sign Language. The production was co-produced by the Gallaudet University theater department, with a number of Gallaudet faculty and students in the cast. The performances took place in Gallaudet's Eastman Studio Theatre. The action interweaves three plot lines: the conflict between Edwin Miner Gallaudet and Alexander Graham Bell on the future of the education of the deaf; Gallaudet's efforts to get Congress to fund a Teacher's College at Kendall Green (which became Gallaudet University); and Bell's initial meeting with Helen Keller, whom he taught to speak using his Visible Speech method. The musical requires most of the cast to be bilingual (English and ASL), and the performances had surtitles throughout.

In September 2015, Avant Bard presented Friendship Betrayed by María de Zayas, a Spanish Golden Age playwright in a translation by Catherine Larson, based on the edition by Valerie Hegstrom. The play was produced in conjunction with the Women's Voices Theater Festival, but it wasn't an official entry because it was not a premiere.

In May 2017, Avant Bard presented Shakespeare's King Lear, featuring prominent DC actor Rick Foucheaux in the title role. This production marked Foucheaux's retirement from acting full time.

== Scripts in Play Festival ==
In 2016, Avant Bard announced its first Scripts in Play festival. Over the course of several weeks, the company presents readings of plays. The festival is a developmental opportunity focused on advancing a playwright's work through collaborative feedback and exploration. Avant Bard has mounted full productions of a handful of SiP scripts in the past and has continued relationships with many of the festival's participating playwrights. Further, other theatres have produced festival scripts after seeing the readings.

In the spring of 2016, during the first festival, Avant Bard presented TAME., by Jonelle Walker, written as a response to The Taming of the Shrew. (The play is stylized as all capitals with a following period.) The play had been a hit in the 2014 Fringe Festival, and it was given a full stage production as part of the 2016–2017 season.

Over the years, several other festival plays have received full productions:

- The Good Devil (in Spite of Himself), a Commedia dell'arte farce by Mario Baldessari and Tyler Herman;
- Emilie: La Marquise du Châtelet Defends Her Life Tonight, by Lauren Gunderson, which received its regional premiere in 2017;
- Illyria, or What You Will, an adaptation of Twelfth Night by Jonelle Walker and Mitchell Hébert, set in a 1980s Manhattan underground queer club.
- Ada and the Engine, by Lauren Gunderson, another Scripts in Play presentation, was cancelled because of the COVID-19 pandemic, but was remounted in March 2022.
- In February 2025, Rorschach Theatre, will produce The Figs, by Doug Robinson, which Avant Bard included in the 2022 Scripts in Play festival.

== Resistance Readings ==
In the fall of 2025, Avant Bard began a monthly series of Resistance Readings (including play readings, film presentations, and cabarets) addressing the current political situation. Notable presentations include:

- December 21, 2025: The Deplorable, contrasting episodes from the American Revolution and the Civil War with actual congressional testimony from four police officers in the aftermath of the January 6, 2021 insurrection at the U.S. Capitol.
- April 19, 2026: A cabaret featuring Songs & Stories of Immigration with Elena La Fulana, and an encore performance of La Pluma Theatre’s The Lady Bird of Saint John.
- June 21, 2026: Every Good Boy Deserves Favour, a reading only of Tom Stoppard's 1977 critique of the Soviet Union's treatment of political dissidents as patients with mental illnesses. (This presentation did not include André Previn's music for the production.)

== Performances in Klingon ==
Avant Bard has a history of presenting performances in Klingon (tlhIngan Hol), as Marc Okrand, the inventor of Klingon, is President of Avant Bard's board of directors.

In 2005, as part of its Bard-37 Canon Cabaret, a series of readings of the entire Shakespeare canon presented in chronological order over several months, the reading of Hamlet included passages read "in the original Klingon".

On September 25, 2010, the company presented By Any Other Name: An Evening of Shakespeare in Klingon, which included scenes from Much Ado About Nothing and Hamlet. Guest star George Takei joined the company, reciting a monologue from Julius Caesar (in English only).

Subsequent to this performance, the company was contacted by the BBC, who wanted to film it for Fry's Planet Word, a documentary series about language written and presented by Stephen Fry. George Takei did not reprise his appearance, but Fry himself took part in the Klingon version of the final scene of Hamlet, playing the role of Osric in costume. This performance took place on February 27, 2011.

Avant Bard then presented a sequel, Shakespeare in Klingon: The Wrath of (Michael) Kahn, on March 4, 2012. This presentation featured a guest appearance by Michael Kahn, the longtime artistic director of the Shakespeare Theatre Company, a large Equity company in downtown Washington, which features productions of Shakespeare and other classic playwrights.

Most recently, Avant Bard presented a staged reading of A Klingon Christmas Carol at the District of Columbia Jewish Community Center's Theatre J, on December 15, 2014. This performance featured Marc Okrand, inventor of the Klingon language (and president of the company's board of directors), as Scrooge (SQuja').

== Recognition and awards ==
In 2011-2012 and in 2015-2015, Avant Bard was selected as "one of the best small charities in the greater Washington region" by the Greater Washington Catalogue for Philanthropy.

=== Mary Goldwater Awards ===
The Mary Goldwater Awards were presented by the Theatre Lobby between 1987 and 2006. Given from a trust fund established by alumni of the Theatre Lobby company, the awards "were given for theatrical excellence without regard to category. If the Judges thought it appropriate, they would give the Award to more than one artist in a given category. Or to none." The Theatre Lobby gave between two and ten awards a year.

Year	Honoree	Cause
1997	Rhea Seehorn	for Travesties at the Washington Shakespeare Company and The Big Slam at Woolly Mammoth Theatre Company
1997	Washington Shakespeare Company	for productions of Travesties and Cymbeline
2003	Jose Carrasquillo, director	for The Maids by Jean Genet
2005	Kathleen Akerley	for Hapgood by Tom Stoppard
2006	Elizabeth Jenkins McFadden, scenic designer	especially for her work for the Washington Shakespeare Company
2006	Bruce Alan Rauscher, actor	for performances with the Washington Shakespeare Company and The American Century Theater
2008	Ayun Fedorcha, lighting designer	Jose Carrasquillo's production of Metamorphosis

=== Helen Hayes Awards ===
Avant Bard has been awarded a number of Helen Hayes Awards.

Note: Starting in 2014, the nominations for Helen Hayes Awards were split into two groups: the Helen Group, for non-Equity productions; and the Hayes Group, for Equity productions. Each award category is awarded for both groups. Then in 2020, the categories for Actor and Actress were combined into the single gender-inclusive Performer category, with ten nominees, instead of the five nominees apiece for Actor and Actress.

Year	Category	Nominee	Production	Result
1992	Outstanding Sound Design, Resident Production	David Crandall	Hamlet	Won
1992	Outstanding Sound Design, Resident Production	David Crandall	Julius Caesar	Nominated
1992	Outstanding Lighting Design, Resident Production	David R. Zemmels	Bloody Poetry	Nominated
1992	Outstanding Lead Actor, Resident Production	T J Edwards	Hamlet	Nominated
1992	Outstanding Director, Resident Production	Jim Stone	Julius Caesar	Nominated
1993	Outstanding Costume Design, Resident Production	Lynnie Raybuck	Frankenstein–Playing with Fire	Nominated
1994	Outstanding Sound Design, Resident Production	David Maddox and Robin M. Heath	Edward II	Nominated
1997	Outstanding Sound Design, Resident Production	Daniel Schrader	Cymbeline	Nominated
1997	Outstanding Lead Actress, Resident Production	Michelle Shupe	Cymbeline	Nominated
1997	Outstanding Lead Actor, Resident Production	David Fendig	Travesties	Nominated
1997	Outstanding Director, Resident Production	Joe Banno	Cymbeline	Nominated
1998	Outstanding Supporting Actress, Resident Production	Rana Kay	5th of July	Nominated
1998	Outstanding Supporting Actor, Resident Production	Christopher Henley	Bent	Nominated
1999	Outstanding Director, Resident Musical	Jesse Berger	Marat/Sade	Won
1999	Outstanding Supporting Actor, Resident Production	Bruce Nelson	The Triumph of Love	Nominated
1999	Outstanding Supporting Performer, Resident Musical	Rhea Seehorn	Marat/Sade	Nominated
1999	Outstanding Set Design, Resident Production	Tony Cisek	Pericles	Nominated
1999	Outstanding Resident Musical		Marat/Sade	Nominated
2000	Outstanding Supporting Actor, Resident Production	Christopher Henley	Entertaining Mr. Sloane	Nominated
2001	Outstanding Lead Actress, Resident Production	Kate Eastwood Norris	Strange Interlude	Nominated
2001	Outstanding Lead Actor, Resident Production	John Emmert	Strange Interlude	Nominated
2003	Outstanding Sound Design, Resident Production	Mark K. Anduss	Tiny Alice	Won
2004	Outstanding Lead Actress, Resident Production	Michelle Shupe	Lady Chatterley's Lover	Nominated
2004	Outstanding Director, Resident Production	John Vreeke	Lady Chatterley's Lover	Nominated
2004	Outstanding Choreography, Resident Production	John Gurski	Scaramouché	Nominated
2015	Outstanding Supporting Actress in a Musical — HELEN	Miranda Medugno	Visible Language	Won
2015	Outstanding Supporting Actress in a Musical - HELEN	Sarah Anne Sillers	Visible Language	Nominated
2015	Outstanding Lead Actor in a Musical - HELEN	Lee Liebeskind	Nero/Pseudo	Nominated
2015	Outstanding Lead Actor in a Musical - HELEN	Bradley Foster Smith	Nero/Pseudo	Nominated
2017	Outstanding Play or Musical Adaptation	Jonelle Walker	TAME.	Nominated
2018	Outstanding Ensemble in a Musical — HELEN		The Gospel at Colonus	Nominated
2020	Outstanding Sound Design – HELEN	e’Marcus Harper-Short	Topdog/Underdog	Nominated
2020	Outstanding Set Design – HELEN	Nephelie Andonyadis	Topdog/Underdog	Won
2020	Outstanding Production in a Play — HELEN		Topdog/Underdog	Nominated
2020	Outstanding Original Play or Musical Adaptation – HELEN	Matt Minnicino, Adapter	A Misanthrope	Nominated
2020	Outstanding Lighting Design — HELEN	John D. Alexander	Topdog/Underdog	Nominated
2020	Outstanding Lead Performer in a Play – HELEN	Louis E. Davis	Topdog/Underdog	Nominated
2020	Outstanding Lead Performer in a Play – HELEN	Jeremy Keith Hunter	Topdog/Underdog	Nominated
2020	Outstanding Direction in a Play — HELEN	DeMone Seraphin	Topdog/Underdog	Nominated
2020	Outstanding Choreography in a Play – HELEN	Casey Kaleba	Topdog/Underdog	Nominated
2025	Outstanding Supporting Performer in a Play — HELEN	Kimberly Gilbert	Coriolanus (co-production with Longacre Lea)	Won
2025	Outstanding Choreography in a Play — HELEN	Bess Kaye	Coriolanus (co-production with Longacre Lea)	Nominated
2026	Outstanding Supporting Performer in a Play — HELEN	Stephen Kime	The Margriad	Won
2026	Outstanding Choreography in a Play — HELEN	James Finley	The Margriad	Nominated

=== BroadwayWorld Washington Awards ===
BroadwayWorld hosts user-nominated awards in cities world-wide. Avant Bard has received several BroadwayWorld Washington nominations in recent years.

Year	Category	Nominee	Production	Result
2019	Best Play — Small Professional Theatre		Topdog/Underdog	Nominated
2020	Best Ensemble (Non-Equity)		Suddenly Last Summer	Nominated
2025	Best Ensemble (Professional)		The Margriad, or The Tragedy of Queen Margaret	Nominated
2025	Best Play (Professional)		The Margriad, or The Tragedy of Queen Margaret	Nominated

== See also ==
- Helen Hayes Award
- Theater in Washington D.C.
