= National Chamber Ensemble =

United States of America

The National Chamber Ensemble (NCE) is an American classical music ensemble founded in 2007 by violinist Leonid Sushansky.

The NCE became Artisphere's Ensemble-in-Residence when Artisphere opened in October 2010. The NCE performs music ranging from classical to contemporary compositions, bringing together composers, musicians and performers from the Washington DC metropolitan area as well as hosting visiting guest artists.
