= Tone (DC band) =

American post-rock band

Tone is an instrumental post-rock band that formed in Washington, DC, in 1991. The group creates dynamic instrumental music using multiple electric guitars. While its two founding members, guitarist Norm Veenstra and drummer Gregg Hudson, have remained constant through most of the group's history, Tone has also included former, current, or future members of Government Issue (Mitch Parker), Edsel (Nick Pellicciotto), Pitchblende (Justin Cherno), Velocity Girl (Jim Spellman and Kelly Riles, now known as Kelly Young), Thud (Gregg Hudson, Adam Rutland, and Bob Dotolo), Teen Idles (Geordie Grindle), Unrest (Phil Krauth), Wharton Tiers Ensemble (Kevin Kim), Strange Boutique (Steve Willett), Caligari (Dennis Kane), Smart Went Crazy (Hillary Soldati), Raymi (Gustavo Vargas), and Night Streets (Charles Andrews). Veenstra has stated in interviews that the band would never have fewer than three guitarists.

Tone has released albums on Kora Records, Neurot, Dischord, and Independent Project Records.

== Band History ==
=== 1991-1995: Formation, early years, and Build ===
Norm Veenstra and Gregg Hudson worked together at the 9:30 Club in Washington, DC, where Veenstra was the General Manager and Hudson, who would later become the Office Manager, made the infamous F Street pizza for the bands when he wasn't working security or bar-backing. Hudson was drumming for THUD when he and Veenstra decided to start a band together based on shared influences and interests.

While Tone's first shows were often described as relentlessly raw, by the time of their first recording sessions in 1993 and 1994 they had evolved into a more precise, if not polished, approach. The group's first CD, Build, was a mini-album of six songs and was recorded by Frank Marchand and Rob Christiansen (of Eggs).

=== 1996-2000: Sustain and Structure ===
From there, Tone began to add more variety to their tonal palette and their song structures. The band recorded two albums with Robert Poss from Band of Susans: 1996's Sustain and 2000's Structure. Still entranced with the hypnotic possibilities of drone and repetition, Tone added an unexpected emotional depth to their growing rhythmic sophistication. Phil Krauth was the drummer for Sustain; Hudson had temporarily moved to L.A. to write music with Distorted Pony's David Uskovich.

In recording Structure in 1998 and 1999, Tone expanded its ranks to fourteen pieces, adding cello, tuba, trumpet, French horn, and trombone. The additional tonal textures helped bring a richer orchestral vibe to the mix while allowing for a more concentrated focus on arrangement. The result was described as "combining the attack of punk with progressive tendencies".

=== 2001-2009: Ambient Metals, Solidarity, and other collaborations, and Priorities ===
Tone released a 7" Alhambra in 2002, marking the band's first appearance on vinyl. The recording was an outtake of material recorded with Poss, mixed together with Don Zientara from several recordings.

Tone also worked with J. Robbins (of Jawbox and Burning Airlines, as well as producer of Jets to Brazil and the Dismemberment Plan) to record its third album Ambient Metals, released in 2003 on Dischord Records. This was the first of Tone's albums to feature a second drummer, Andy Myers. The Chicago Tribune writes of Ambient Metals: "Tone emphasizes widescreen melodies and ringing timbres, striking unison chords that radiate clouds of overtones over surging martial rhythms." Andrew Beaujon of the Washington Post writes of Ambient Metals, "the instrumental ensemble Tone has an uncanny ability to summon the wide-open spaces of the American Southwest. That can be credited partly to leader Norm Veenstra's love of '80s sonic boomers such as Savage Republic and Nice Strong Arm, but it's his other great influence, the guitar orchestras of New York avant-garde composers Rhys Chatham and Glenn Branca, that gives Tone the muscle to suggest not just the desert's beauty, but its menace as well."

Solidarity was recorded by Robbins at Phase in College Park, MD, and mixed by Robbins at Inner Ear in 2004. Ignacio Coluccio of Maelstrom magazine writes of Solidarity: "The songs usually contain a wall of sound, but, oddly, a pleasing one (a little bit like Godspeed! You Black Emperor). A big part of Solidarity's compositional aspect is the build-up, almost all the songs have it and it's a definite plus, so it wouldn't be so crazy to call Tone a post-rock act. But no. A good way to summarize Solidarity would be 'ambient music'."

In January 2009, Tone recorded Priorities with Robbins in Baltimore at his new studio Magpie Cage. This was the last Tone album to have two drummers. In the Washington CityPaper, Ryan Little writes of Priorities: "Each of the five songs stretches past five minutes, and all of them center on shimmery guitars that slowly gain intensity....Priorities is nothing if not mindfully crafted, and the record subtly showcases a diversity of influences within its unbending framework." The Washington Post writes of Priorities: "The album showcases what Tone does best - shimmering, guitar-driven songs that swell and expand with each layered repetition."

From late 2004 to early 2006, Tone collaborated with the Bowen McCauley Dance Company in preparation for key performances at the Kennedy Center and the 2006 Schrittmacher Festival in Aachen, Germany. In 2011, Tone again collaborated with the Bowen McCauley Dance Company at its 15th anniversary performance at the Kennedy Center's Terrace Theatre.

=== 2010-present: present recordings ===
In the Fall of 2010, Tone recorded the song "Incoming" with Jack MacInnis in DC; the song was mixed by Converge guitarist Kurt Ballou and released digitally in 2014. It was the group's first recording as a five-piece band.

In 2011, Tone celebrated its 20-year anniversary with two shows with Savage Republic and Caspian, including a show at the Black Cat in DC.

In 2014, Tone recorded a new full-length album with J.Robbins at Magpie Cage Studios in Baltimore, MD. The album was released in June 2016.

== Band members ==
=== Current members ===
- Norm Veenstra, guitar (1991–present)
- Gregg Hudson, drums (1991–1994, 1996–present)
- Boris Milic, guitar (2017–present)
- Gustavo Vargas, guitar (2012–present)
- Charles Andrews, bass (2011–present)

=== Previous Members ===
- Jim Williamson, guitar (1993–2017)
- Adam Rutland, guitar (1991–1993)
- Andy Myers, drums (2000–2008)
- Bob Dotolo, guitar (1991)
- Dennis Kane, bass (1998–2004)
- Doug Wandell, guitar (2002–2009)
- Geordie Grindle, guitar (1993–2006)
- Jack MacInnis, guitar (2008–2012)
- Josh Bennett, guitar (1991–1999)
- Justin Cherno, guitar (1991–1993)
- Kelly Young (credited as Kelly Riles), guitar (1991)
- Kevin Kim, guitar (1993–2000)
- Michael Mills, guitar (1993–1996)
- Mitch Parker, guitar (1991–1997)
- Phil Krauth, drums/percussion (1994–1996)
- Rob Gutaowski, trombone, (1996, 1998)
- Shaun Wright, bass (2005–2011)
- Steve Willett, guitar (1997–2008)
- Tom Berard, bass guitar (1991–1997)

=== Collaborators ===
- Alice Despard, trombone (1996)
- Boris Skalsky, bass guitar (2004–2005, for Bowen McCauley Dance Company performances)
- Geordie Grindle, guitar (2011, for Bowen McCauley Dance Company performances)
- Hilary Soldati, cello (1998, 2000)
- Jeff McCasland, trumpet (1996)
- Jim Spellman, guitar (1991)
- Nick Pellicciotto, guitar (1991)
- Paul Wood, guitar (2006, for Bowen McCauley Dance Company performances)
- Peter Geddess, French horn (1996, 1998)
- Royce West, tuba (1996, 1998)
- Steve Willett, guitar (2011, for Bowen McCauley Dance Company performances)
- Bowen McCauley Dance Company (2004–2006, 2011)

== Discography ==
=== Albums ===
- Build (Independent Project Records, November 1994)
- Sustain (Independent Project Records, October 1996)
- Structure (Brookland/Dischord, May 2000)
- Ambient Metals (Brookland/Dischord, 20 January 2003)
- Solidarity (Neurot Records, 2006)
- Priorities (the Kora Records, April 2012)
- Antares (TminusOneMusic/Dischord, June 2016)

=== Singles ===
- Cassette (1993)
- Alhambra 7" (2002)
- Incoming (self-released on bandcamp, 23 January 2014)
- Bright Angel Falls (self-released on bandcamp, 23 December 2014)

=== Compilations ===
- Indie Rock Blueprint – track "Sugartime" (Go Compact Discs, 1996)
- Fort Reno Benefit Compilation – track "A Camel's Dream" (Resin Records, 2000)
- Currents and Directions – track "Thirteen Cuts" (Meridien Records, 2002)
- World Domination Recordings / Independent Project Records Sampler – track "Nostalgia and Remorse" (World Domination Recordings / Independent Project Records, 2006)
- In Pleasant Company: A Benefit Compilation for Jason Noble – track "Wintermore" (cassette/Bandcamp, 2012)

== Notable Performances ==
- May 1996: Indie Fest #1, Arlington, VA
- April 1997: University of Florida Spring Fling/Spring Festival
- November 1997: Cones & Rods Festival, Baltimore, MD
- January 2004: Speechless, Washington, DC
- November 2004: Bowen McCauley Dance, Kennedy Center, Washington, DC
- January 2006: Bowen McCauley Dance, Kennedy Center, Washington, DC
- March 2006: Bowen McCauley Dance, Schrittmacher Dance Festival, Aachen, Germany
- October 2006: CMJ, NYC, NY
- March, 2010: SXSW, Austin, TX
- April 2, 2011: 14th annual Mid-Atlantic College Radio Conference (MACRoCK), Harrisonburg, VA
- September 16, 2011: Tone's 20-year Anniversary Concert at the Black Cat, Washington, DC
- April 4, 2015: 18th annual Mid-Atlantic College Radio Conference (MACRoCK), Harrisonburg, VA
- August 2015: Secret Stages V (5th), Birmingham, Alabama
