= Atlantis: The Lost Empire (disambiguation) =

Atlantis: The Lost Empire is a 2001 American animated science fantasy film.

Atlantis: The Lost Empire may also refer to:

- Atlantis: The Lost Empire (soundtrack), the accompanying film score by James Newton Howard
- Atlantis: The Lost Empire – Trial by Fire, a first-person shooter game
- Atlantis: The Lost Empire (2001 video game), an action-adventure game

== See also ==
- Atlantis (disambiguation)
