= Atlantis (franchise) =

Disney media franchise

Disney's Atlantis
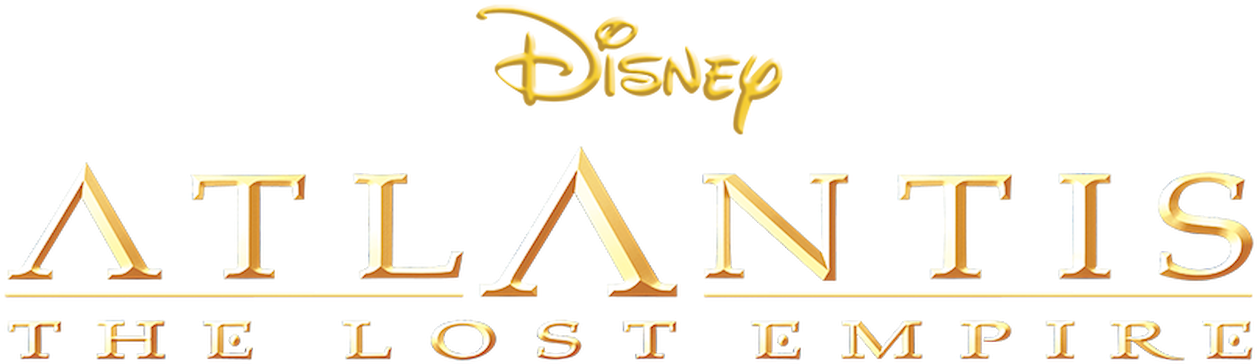
- Logo of the first film
- Created by: Kirk Wise; Gary Trousdale; Joss Whedon; Bryce Zabel; Jackie Zabel; Tab Murphy
- Original work: Atlantis: The Lost Empire (2001)
- Owner: The Walt Disney Company
- Years: 2001–present

Films and television
- Film: Atlantis: The Lost Empire (2001)
- Direct-to-video: Atlantis: Milo's Return (2003)

Games
- Video games: Atlantis: The Lost Empire – Search for the Journal (2001); Atlantis: The Lost Empire – Trial by Fire (2001); Disney Heroes: Battle Mode (2018); Disney Dreamlight Valley (2023)

Audio
- Soundtrack: Atlantis: The Lost Empire (2001)

Miscellaneous
- Constructed language: Atlantean language

Atlantis is a media franchise owned by The Walt Disney Company that began in 2001 with the release of the film Atlantis: The Lost Empire, directed by Gary Trousdale and Kirk Wise from a screenplay by Tab Murphy and produced by Don Hahn. The film set in Atlantis, first described in the works Timaeus and Critias by the ancient Greek philosopher Plato.

The franchise consists of two animated films, Atlantis: The Lost Empire (2001) and Atlantis: Milo's Return (2003), as well as several video games based on the first film.

== Films ==
Film	Release date	Director(s)	Screenwriter(s)	Story by	Producer(s)
Atlantis: The Lost Empire	June 15, 2001	Gary Trousdale & Kirk Wise	Tab Murphy	Kirk Wise, Gary Trousdale, Joss Whedon, Bryce Zabel, Jackie Zabel & Tab Murphy	Don Hahn
Atlantis: Milo's Return	May 20, 2003	Victor Cook, Toby Shelton & Tad Stones	Steve Englehart	Steve Englehart, Thomas Hart, Kevin Hopps, Tad Stones, Marty Isenberg & Henry Gilroy	Tad Stones

=== Atlantis: The Lost Empire (2001) ===
Atlantis: The Lost Empire is a theatrical film produced by Walt Disney Animation Studios—the first science fiction film in Disney's animated features canon.

=== Atlantis: Milo's Return (2003) ===
Atlantis: Milo's Return is a direct-to-video film and is a sequel to 2001's Atlantis: The Lost Empire.

== Cancelled projects ==
=== Atlantis II ===
Originally, Disney was developing a theatrical sequel, but it was abandoned once The Lost Empire was less successful than anticipated. Gary Trousdale and Kirk Wise were set to return as directors, along with Don Hahn as producer and John Sanford as story supervisor. According to Wise, the sequel would have seen most of the original characters return. The main villain was to be Helga Sinclair, who survived the events of the first film, was turned into a cyborg, and established a mercenary group to raid Atlantis.

=== Team Atlantis ===
The film was also meant to have a sequel animated series, Team Atlantis, which would have featured mythological and ancient elements such as Puck, the Loch Ness Monster, the Terracotta Army, and Demona, a character from Gargoyles. Because of the film's failure, Team Atlantis went unproduced. Its planned episodes were incorporated into Atlantis: Milo's Return, with additional animation made to link them.

== Cast and characters ==
Key
- A dark gray cell indicates the character was not in the film.
- A ^{Y} indicates an actor appeared as a younger version of their character.

Character	Atlantis: The Lost Empire	Atlantis: Milo's Return
Character	2001	2003
Primary cast
Milo James Thatch	Michael J. Fox	James Arnold Taylor
Princess Kidagakash "Kida" Nedakh	Cree Summer Natalie Strom^{Y}	Cree Summer
Commander Lyle Tiberius Rourke	James Garner	Mentioned
Lieutenant Helga Katrina Sinclair	Claudia Christian	
Vincenzo "Vinny" Santorini	Don Novello	Don Novello
Dr. Joshua Strongbear Sweet	Phil Morris	Phil Morris
Audrey Rocio Ramirez	Jacqueline Obradors	Jacqueline Obradors
Gaetan "Mole" Molière	Corey Burton	Corey Burton
Wilhelmina Bertha Packard	Florence Stanley	Florence Stanley
Jebidiah Allardyce "Cookie" Farnsworth	Jim Varney	Steven Barr
Preston B. Whitmore	John Mahoney	John Mahoney
Obby		Frank Welker
Edgar Volgud		Clancy Brown
Ashtin Carnaby		Thomas F. Wilson
Erik Hellstrom		Morgan Sheppard
Supporting cast
King Kashekim Nedakh	Leonard Nimoy	Mentioned
Queen of Atlantis	Cree Summer	
Fenton Q. Harcourt	David Ogden Stiers	
Inger Allyson		Jean Gilpin
Sam McKeane		Jeff Bennett
Chakashi		Floyd Westerman

== Video games ==
=== Atlantis: The Lost Empire – Search for the Journal ===
Atlantis: The Lost Empire – Search for the Journal is a first-person shooter game developed by Zombie Studios and published by Disney Interactive. It was released on May 1, 2001, for Microsoft Windows.

=== Atlantis: The Lost Empire – Trial by Fire ===
Atlantis: The Lost Empire – Trial by Fire is a first-person shooter game developed by Zombie Studios and published by Disney Interactive. It was released on May 18, 2001, for Microsoft Windows.

=== Atlantis: The Lost Empire ===
Atlantis: The Lost Empire is an action-adventure game developed by Eurocom Entertainment Software and published by Sony Computer Entertainment for the PlayStation, and a platform game developed by Eurocom Entertainment Software for the Game Boy Color and 3d6 Games for the Game Boy Advance, and published by THQ on both consoles. The PlayStation version was released on June 12, 2001, the Game Boy Color version was released on June 14, 2001, and the Game Boy Advance version was released on September 28, 2001.

=== Other games ===
- Atlantis was intended to be represented in the original Kingdom Hearts. Creator Tetsuya Nomura found it difficult to incorporate it into the game due to the vast amount of vehicles featured compared to the video game's Gummi Ship mechanic.
- Milo, Kida, Vinny, Audrey, and Helga were included as playable characters in the mobile game Disney Heroes: Battle Mode.
- The Atlantean culture is a recurring element in the game Disney Dreamlight Valley, where it is referred as the "Ancient Civilization". Various ruins based on the city of Atlantis are found in various places in the village. The diary notes of the valley's ruler (the player) are also written in the Atlantean language. Milo will appear as one of the villagers in the DLC of the game "The Keepsake Sea".

== Proposed attractions ==
- Atlantis Submarine Voyage - After Disneyland closed its Submarine Voyage ride in 1998, there were reportedly intentions to reopen it with a new theme by 2003. Rumors circulated that Disney planned to renovate the ride to have an Atlantis: The Lost Empire theme. Any existing plans for an Atlantis-themed remodel were canceled after the film's financial failure. The attraction was re-opened in 2007 as the Finding Nemo Submarine Voyage, based on the more successful film Finding Nemo.
- Fire Mountain - After the Submarine Voyage's Magic Kingdom counterpart, 20,000 Leagues Under the Sea: Submarine Voyage, closed down in 1994, four years before Disneyland's, there were proposals of a new attraction that would take its place, with one of them a volcano attraction in the Magic Kingdom's Adventureland area. Around 1999, during development of Atlantis: The Lost Empire, it was decided that it would be themed to the film, with it taking place in 1916, two years after the film's events. The ride would have focused on Preston Whitmore seeking to make Atlantis's existence public and offer expeditions to visitors in newly developed vehicles. However, due to mishaps, the vehicles would be forced to make a detour through the lava-filled caverns of the volcano. The attraction would have used a unique hybrid ride system, in which it would start as a standard coaster before the trains hook up to a suspended track midway through to fly through the caverns. The attraction would have been accessed by a new canyon path in between Pirates of the Caribbean and a re-routed Jungle Cruise that would have led to a Whitmore Enterprises base camp at the edge of the Walt Disney World Railroad path, with the mountain itself being built outside the berm. Like the Submarine Voyage retheme, the ride was cancelled due to the film's financial failure.

== Music ==
The soundtrack of Atlantis: The Lost Empire was released on May 22, 2001. It consists primarily of James Newton Howard's score and includes "Where the Dream Takes You", written by Howard and Diane Warren and performed by Mya. It was also available in a limited edition with a 3D cover depicting the Leviathan from the film. A promotional edition featuring 20 additional minutes of material was made exclusively for Academy of Motion Picture Arts and Sciences voters, but was bootlegged and distributed elsewhere.

== Other media ==
- The characters from the first film have cameo appearances in episodes of the television series House of Mouse. In the episode "Donald Wants to Fly", Rourke appears briefly among the audience, amazed to see Kida flying in a Ketak. In "Dining Goofy", Mrs. Packard appears in the audience speaking through a radio.
- The characters from the first film appear as a cameo in the short film Once Upon a Studio (2023) as part of the characters from Walt Disney Animation Studios who come together to take a group photo.
- The Curse of Kurok is a 2026 graphic novel that serves as a sequel to the first film.

== Atlantean language ==
The Atlantean language is a constructed language created by Marc Okrand for Atlantis: The Lost Empire. The language was intended by the script-writers to be a possible "mother language", and Okrand crafted it to include a Indo-European word stock with its own grammar, which is agglutinative and inspired by Sumerian and North American languages.

To create this, Okrand took common characteristics of all world languages and applied them to the Proto-Indo-European language. His main source of words (roots and stems) for the language is Proto-Indo-European, but Okrand also uses ancient Chinese, Biblical Hebrew, Latin, and Greek languages, along with a variety of other ancient languages or ancient language reconstruction.
