= Atlantean language =

Constructed language

Atlantean
- Dig Adlantisag
- Pronunciation: diɡ ɑdlɑntisɑɡ
- Created by: Marc Okrand
- Date: 1996–2001
- Setting and usage: 2001 film Atlantis: The Lost Empire and related media
- Purpose: constructed languages: Artistic languages; Fictional languages; Atlantean
- Writing system: Atlantean Script
- Sources: Constructed languages; A posteriori languages

Language codes
- ISO 639-3: None (mis)
- Glottolog: None
- IETF: art-x-atlantea

The Atlantean language is a constructed language created by Marc Okrand specially for the Walt Disney Feature Animation film Atlantis: The Lost Empire. The language was intended by the script-writers to be a possible mother language, and Okrand crafted it to include a vast Indo-European word stock with its very own grammar, which is at times described as highly agglutinative, inspired by Sumerian and North American Indigenous languages.

== Creation ==
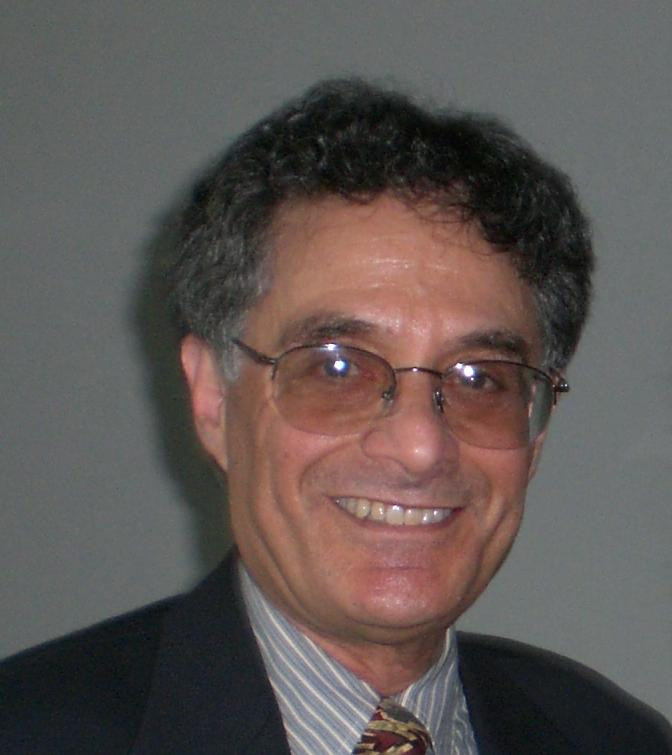
Linguist Marc Okrand was hired by Disney to create the Atlantean language.

The Atlantean language (Dig Adlantisag) is a historically constructed, artistic language created by Marc Okrand for Disney's 2001 film Atlantis: The Lost Empire and associated media. The Atlantean language is based both on historic reconstructions as well as on the fantasy/science fiction setting of Atlantis: The Lost Empire. The fictional principles upon which the Atlantean language was created are: Atlantean is the "Tower of Babel language", the "root dialect" from which all languages descended; it has existed without change since sometime before 100,000 B.C., in the First or Second Age of Atlantis until the present.

To accomplish this, Okrand looked for common characteristics from various world languages and was also heavily inspired by the Proto-Indo-European language. His main source of words (roots and stems) for the language is Proto-Indo-European, but Okrand combines this with Biblical Hebrew, later Indo-European languages such as Latin and Greek, and a variety of other known or reconstructed ancient languages.

== Writing systems ==
Atlantean has its own script created expressly for the film by John Emerson with the help of Marc Okrand, and inspired by ancient alphabetical scripts, most notably Semitic. There are, however, different kinds of transliteration into the Roman script.

=== Atlantean Script ===
The Atlantean script and numerals

There is no punctuation or capitalization in the native Atlantean Writing System. Okrand based this on ancient writing systems. The Atlantean Script is normally in boustrophedon, that is to say it is written left to right for the first line, right to left the second, and left to right again the third, to continue the pattern. This order was also suggested by Okrand, based on ancient writing systems, and it was accepted because, as he explained, "It's a back-and-forth movement, like water, so that worked."

The Atlantean script includes more characters than are actually employed in the language itself. These letters being c, f, j, q, v, x, z, ch, or th, they were created so that Atlantean might be used as a simple cipher code in the media and for promotional purposes. They are all also based on diverse ancient characters, just like the rest of the alphabet.

=== Roman Script ===
Apart from the native Atlantean script created for the film, the language can be transcribed using the Roman script. There are two versions for doing so:

1. Standard Transcription, how the language is transliterated by Marc Okrand himself.
2. Reader's Script, a Berlitz-style notation devised by Okrand, which he hoped would make the Atlantean easier to read for the actors.

Example sentence, broken down:

Nishentop Adlantisag, kelobtem Gabrin karoklimik bet gim demottem net getunosentem bernotlimik bet kagib lewidyoh.
NEE-shen-toap AHD-luhn-tih-suhg, KEH-loab-tem GAHB-rihn KAH-roak-lih-mihk bet gihm DEH-moat-tem net GEH-tuh-noh-sen-tem behr-NOAT-lih-mihk bet KAH-gihb LEH-wihd-yoakh.
spirit-PL-VOC Atlantis-GEN, chamber-ACC 2.PL.FAM-GEN defile-PPERF-1.SG for and land-ACC into intruder-PL-ACC bring-PPERF-1.SG for 1.SG-DAT forgive-IMP-PL
"Spirits of Atlantis, forgive me for defiling your chamber and bringing intruders into the land."

The following is a table that shows the correspondences between the different modes of transcription and also provides the probable IPA values.

Correspondences
Standard Transcription	a	b	g	d	e	u	w	h	i	y	k	l	m	n	o	p	r	s	sh	t
Reader's Script	ah, uh	b	g	d	eh, e	oo, u	w	kh	ee, ih	y	k	l	m	n	oa, oh	p	r	s	sh	t
IPA	[ɑ, ə]	[b]	[g]	[d]	[e, ɛ]	[u, ʊ]	[w]	[x]	[i, ɪ]	[j]	[k]	[l]	[m]	[n]	[o, ɔ]	[p]	[r, ɾ]	[s]	[ʃ]	[t]

=== Numerals ===
John Emerson, Marc Okrand, and the filmmakers also created numerals for 0–9. They are stacked horizontally, however, and hold place values of 1, 20, and 400. Their components are based on Mayan numerals and internally composed for the font (example above) like Roman numerals. If used according to the now-offline Official Website's directions, they are used, alternatively, like Arabic numerals.

Cardinal numbers
Numeral	Atlantean	English
1	din	one
2	dut	two
3	sey	three
4	kut	four
5	sha	five
6	luk	six
7	tos	seven
8	ya	eight
9	nit	nine
10	ehep	ten
20	dut dehep	twenty
30	sey dehep	thirty
40	kut dehep	forty
50	sha dehep	fifty
60	luk dehep	sixty
70	tos dehep	seventy
80	ya dehep	eighty
90	nit dehep	ninety

==== Numeral suffixes ====
Ordinals are formed adding the suffix -(d)lag: sey 'three', seydlag 'third'. The d is omitted if the root ends with an obstruent or nasal consonant: dut 'two', dutlag 'second'. Fractions are formed with the suffix -(d)lop: kut 'four', kutlop 'quarter', sha 'five', shadlop 'fifth (part)'. And finally, distributives are formed with the suffix noh: din 'one', dinnoh 'one at a time, one each'.

== Phonology ==
=== Consonants ===
IPA chart of Atlantean consonants
		Bilabial	Alveolar	(Alveolo-) palatal	Velar
Nasal		m	n		
Plosive	voiceless	p	t		k
Plosive	voiced	b	d		ɡ
Fricative			s	ʃ (Note: Transliterated as ⟨sh⟩ in Writer's Script and Reader's Script.)	x (Note: Transliterated as ⟨h⟩ in Writer's Script (bibɪx, inner cover of Subterranean Tours) and ⟨kh⟩ in Reader's Script.)
Approximant		w	l	j (Note: Transliterated as ⟨y⟩ in Writer's Script and Reader's Script.)	
Trill			r		

=== Vowels ===
Atlantean's phonetic inventory includes a vowel system with five phonemes. Most vowels have two prominent allophonic realizations, depending on whether it occurs in a stressed or unstressed syllable.

IPA chart of Atlantean vowels
	Front		Central		Back	
	Tense	Lax	Tense	Lax	Tense	Lax
High	i	ɪ			u	ʊ
Mid	e	ɛ			o	ɔ
Low			a	ə		

Vowels in stressed syllables tend to be tense, and likewise unstressed ones tend to be more lax. Thus, for example, /i/ is realized as [i] or [ɪ] in stressed and unstressed syllables, respectively. Likewise, /e/ is realized as [e] or [ɛ], and so on. There are three diphthongs, namely ay, ey, oy.

Aside from the stressed-syllable-based vowel system, the only other example of prominent phonological phenomenon seems to be a special kind of sandhi occurring in verbs, when the pronoun is combined with the aspect marker.

When the suffix for the first person singular -ik combines with tenses that employ -i, -o (Past and Future tenses), it becomes -mik.

bernot-o-ik → bernot-o-mik

But when combined with suffixes that feature -e (Present tenses), the same suffix becomes -kik.

bernot-e-ik → bernot-e-kik

== Grammar ==
Atlantean has a strict subject–object–verb word order, with no deviations from this pattern attested. Adjectives and nouns in the genitive case follow the nouns they modify, adpositions appear only in the form of postpositions, and modal verbs follow the verbs that they modify and subsequently take all personal and aspectual suffixes. However, adverbs precede verbs. The language includes the use of an interrogative particle to form questions with no variation in word order.

Some sentences appear to employ some kind of particles sometimes termed "sentence connectors". These particles are of obscure meaning but are theorized to relate two clauses in a logical yet idiomatic manner. The exact meaning and usage of these particles is not known, but without them sentences are difficult to reconcile with their translations.

Wiltem neb gamosetot deg duweren tirid.
city-ACC DEM see-PRES-3SG PART outsider-PL all.
"No outsiders may see the city and live."
(But more literally: "He sees the city particle all outsiders.")

In the example above there is no actual mention of the consequences for outsiders, yet the subtitle in the movie translates it as a warning even without any mention of living or dying. A possibility exists that, in order to match the lip movement of the characters in the movie and the time of the dialogue, the language had to be shortened, often leaving out key parts of the sentence. It is known that the Atlantean lines in the movie were ad-libbed afterwards.

Tab.top, lud.en neb.et kwam gesu bog.e.kem deg yasek.en gesu.go.ntoh.
father-VOC, person-PL DEM-PL NEG help {be able}-PRES-1SG PART noble-PL help-FUT.POSB-3PL
"Father, these people may be able to help us."
(But more literally: "Oh Father, we cannot help these people particle they will help the nobles."

In this example the sentences seem to be better connected, and the particle is rendered as almost "but, yet". It is difficult to reconcile the two, however.

=== Nouns ===
Atlantean has seven cases for nouns, five for pronouns and two for numbers.

==== Grammatical cases ====
Grammatical Cases
Name	Suffix	Example	English Gloss
Nominative	no suffix	yob	the crystal (subject).
Accusative	-tem	yobtem	the crystal (object).
Genitive	-ag	yobag	of the crystal
Vocative	-top (Note: With the exception of "mat", "mother", which takes the special Maternal Filial Suffix -tim. Note that the only other kinship term, "father", "tab", takes the usual -top.)	Yobtop	O Crystal!
Instrumental	-esh	yobesh	using crystal
Essive	-kup (Note: As discussed in "The Shepherd's Journal" on the "Collector's DVD": ketub-kup (page 4) and setub-mok-en-tem (page 10), setub-mok-en-ag (page 5), and setub-kup (pages 1–4).)	yobkup	(as, composed of, being) crystal
Dative	-nuh (Note: As discussed in "The Shepherd's Journal" on the "Collector's DVD": derup-tem and derup-nuh (page 5).)	yobnuh	(for, to, on behalf of) crystal

==== Other suffixes ====
Other Noun Suffixes
Grammatical Function	Suffix	Example	English Gloss
Plural	-en	yoben	crystals
Augmentative	-mok	Yobmok	The Great Crystal

Nouns are marked as plural with the suffix -en. Case suffixes never precede the -en plural suffix. "-Mok" occurs after it.

=== Pronouns ===
Independent Pronoun
		Singular	Plural
1st person		kag	gwis
2nd person	unfamiliar	moh	gebr
2nd person	familiar	moh	gabr
3rd person		tug tuh tok	sob

Suffix
	Singular	Plural
1st person	-ik	-kem
2nd person	-en	-eh
3rd person	-ot	-toh

There are five cases for pronouns.

==== Grammatical cases ====
Grammatical Cases
Name	Suffix	Example	English Gloss
Nominative	no suffix	kag	I
Accusative	-it	kagit	me, whom was (sent), etc.
Dative	-ib	kagib	(to) me
Genitive	-in	kagin	my (my heart, karod kagin)
Instrumental	-is	kagis	by my means, with (using) me, via me, etc. (Note: The pronoun analog to the noun instrumental case suffix -esh. Appears in "First Mural Text" on the "Collector's DVD": tug-is.)

=== Verbs ===
Verbs are inflected with two suffixes, one for tense/aspect and the next for person/number.

==== Tense/aspect suffixes ====
Tense/Aspect suffixes
	Name	Suffix	Example	Other Examples
Present	Simple Present	-e	bernot.e.kik bring-PRES-1SG; I bring	sapoh.e.kik I view
Present	Present Perfect	-le	bernot.le.kik bring-PRES.PERF-1SG; I have brought	
Present	Present Obligatory	-se	bernot.se.kik bring-PRES.OBLG-1SG; I am obliged to bring	kaber.se.kem we are obliged to warn
Past	Simple Past	-i	bernot.i.mik bring-PAST-1SG; I brought	es.i.mot it was sapoh.i.mik I viewed
Past	Immediate Past	-ib	bernot.ib.mik bring-IMM.PAST-1SG; I just brought	
Past	Past Perfect	-li	bernot.li.mik bring-PAST.PERF-1SG; I had brought	
Future	Simple Future	-o	bernot.o.mik bring-FUT-1SG; I will bring	komtib.o.nen you will find
Future	Future Possible	-go	bernot.go.mik bring-FUT.POSB-1SG; I may bring	gesu.go.ntoh they may help
Future	Future Perfect	-lo	bernot.lo.mik bring-FUT.PERF-1SG; I will have brought	komtib.lo.nen you will have found
Future	Future Obligatory	-so	bernot.so.mik bring-FUT.OBLG-1SG; I will be obliged to bring	komtib.so.nen you will be obliged to find

==== Mood and Voice suffixes ====
Mood suffixes
Name	Suffix	Example	English Gloss
Imperative Mood Singular	no suffix	bernot!, nageb!	bring!, enter!
Imperative Mood Plural	-yoh	bernot.yoh!, nageb.yoh!	(you all) bring!, (you all) enter!
Passive Voice	-esh	pag.esh.e.nen, bernot.esh.ib.mik	you are thanked (thank you), I was just brought
Infinitive	-e	bernot.e, wegen.e, gamos.e	to bring, to travel, to see

== In other media ==
Apart from its use in the Atlantis franchise, the Atlantean script is used to encode some English in the video game Disney Dreamlight Valley, mainly in the notes written in the diary of the valley's ruler (the player).

== See also ==
- Languages in Star Wars - Another Disney property with constructed languages
