= Atlantis: The Lost Empire – Trial by Fire =

2001 movie-tie in video game

- Developer: Zombie Studios
- Publisher: Disney Interactive
- Series: Atlantis
- Platform: Microsoft Windows
- Release: NA: May 18, 2001
- Genre: First-person shooter
- Modes: Single-player, multiplayer

Atlantis: The Lost Empire – Trial by Fire is a 2001 first-person shooter game developed by Zombie Studios and published by Disney Interactive. It was released on May 18, 2001, for Microsoft Windows. The game is based on the film Atlantis: The Lost Empire.

The first levels correspond to Atlantis: The Lost Empire – Search for the Journal, which was distributed separately weeks earlier in 2001, as a demo to promote Trial by Fire. It was released for free in children's magazines, DVDs, Kellogg's cereal boxes, and in pharmacies. The game was also offered as a free download through Disney Interactive's website in June 2001.

== Gameplay ==
This game mainly follows the events in the movie. The player begins on the USS Ulysses as the Leviathan is attacking, and must escape through the underwater cave system on a subpod, evading Leviathan spawn. The player must navigate through the caverns to Atlantis, and solve puzzles to reach the crystal at the end of the game.

== Reception ==
Reception

Aggregate scores
Aggregator	Score
GameRankings	56.22%
Metacritic	50/100

Review scores
Publication	Score
GameRevolution	D−
GameSpot	4.7/10
GameSpy	77%
GameZone	6.2/10
IGN	5/10
PC Gamer (US)	50%
The Cincinnati Enquirer	3.5/5

Trial by Fire was met with mixed reviews, as GameRankings gave it a score of 56.22%, while Metacritic gave it 50 out of 100.

The game was rated 5 out of 10 by IGN, which called the levels "incredibly short, small, and fairly uninspired" and recommended to avoid the game.
