= Where the Dream Takes You =

2001 promotional single by Mya

Promotional single by Mya

from the album Atlantis: The Lost Empire
- Released: June 5, 2001
- Recorded: 2001
- Studio: Royaltone (North Hollywood, California)
- Genre: Pop
- Length: 4:00
- Label: Walt Disney; Interscope
- Composers: Diane Warren; James Newton Howard
- Lyricist: Diane Warren
- Producers: Ron Fair; Sol Survivor; Robbie Buchanan

"Where the Dream Takes You" is a song by American singer Mya. It was written by songwriter Diane Warren and composer James Newton Howard for Disney's animated film Atlantis: The Lost Empire (2001). Produced by Ron Fair, Sol Survivor, and Robbie Buchanan, the song was released by Walt Disney Records and Interscope Records on June 5, 2001, as the only promotional single from the film's soundtrack.

Directors Kirk Wise and Gary Trousdale agreed that Atlantis: The Lost Empire, their third feature-length animated film for Disney, would not be a musical, but the studio insisted that at least one song be featured in its end credits to promote the film. Disney hired Mya to record a song for the Atlantis soundtrack because of their shared business relationships with A&M/Interscope Records. Both Warren and Howard collaborated on the song's melody, which samples Howard's own orchestral score, while Warren wrote the lyrics. A pop ballad, "Where the Dream Takes You" is an inspirational song about following one's heart and self-discovery, which alludes to the film's plot about a young adventurer's search for the lost city of Atlantis.

"Where the Dream Takes You" is the only song from Atlantis: The Lost Empire that features both music and lyrics. Upon its release 10 days ahead of the film, the ballad was criticized for sounding generic and uninspired. Some critics also questioned Disney's decision to have Mya to record the song, believing the single would have benefited from a more experienced vocalist. However, the song was nominated for Best Original Song Written Directly for a Film at the World Soundtrack Awards.

== Writing and recording ==
Unlike most of Disney's animated films released to that point, Atlantis: The Lost Empire (2001) forgoes the use of songs and musical numbers to aid its storytelling. After having directed two Disney musicals consecutively, Kirk Wise and Gary Trousdale agreed that Atlantis: The Lost Empire, their third animated film for Disney, would not be a musical or feature power ballads. However, by the time the film was released, it had become practice for Disney to select young artists to record pop songs for their films' soundtrack albums, thus Disney's marketing department insisted that Atlantis: The Lost Empire feature at least one song during its closing credits as a compromise. Earlier that same year, the releases of The Mummy Returns and Pearl Harbor had also been accompanied by pop songs to attract a wider audience, a pattern Disney would follow with Atlantis.

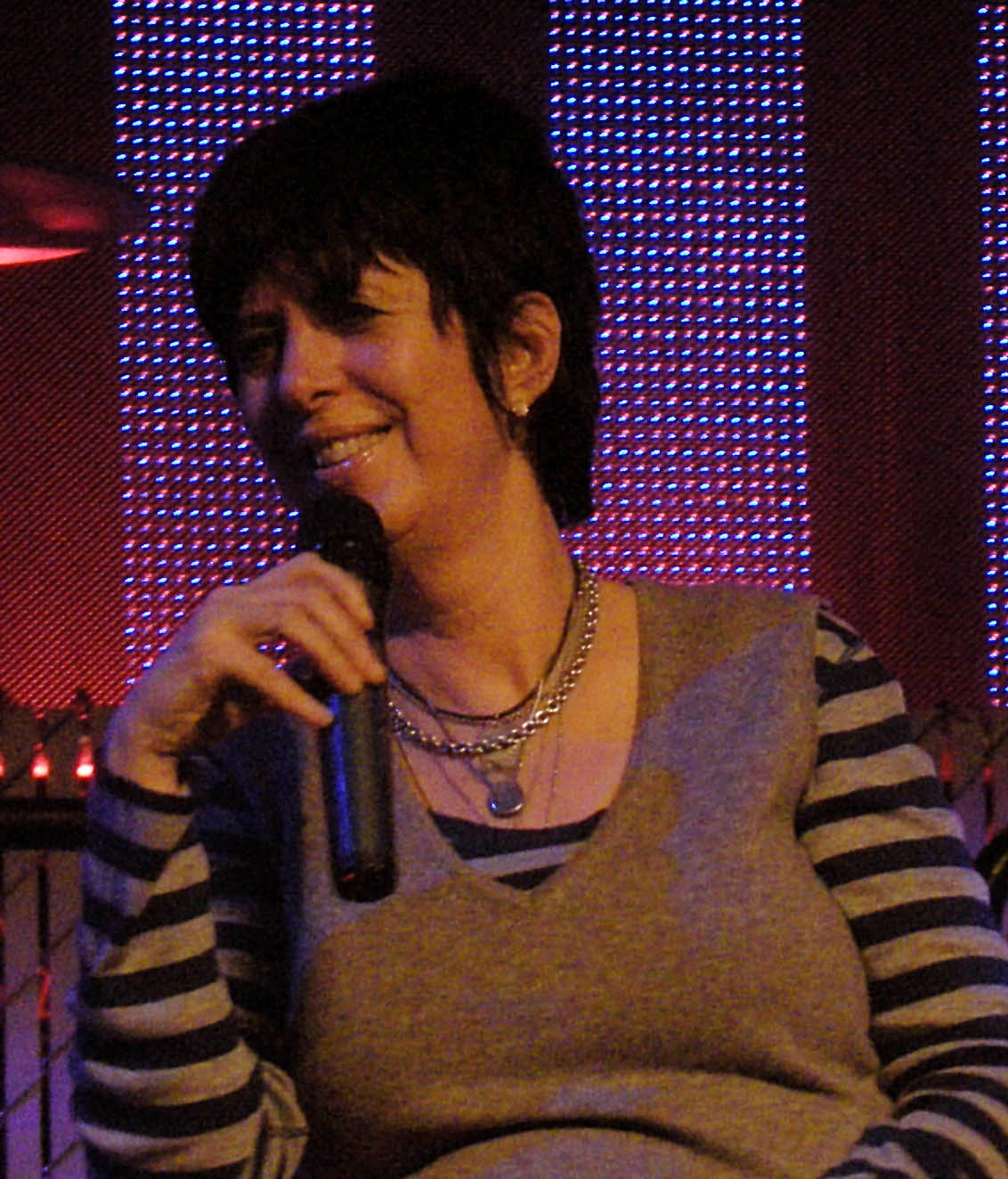
Songwriter Diane Warren co-wrote "Where the Dream Takes You" with composer James Newton Howard.

Music journalist Chuck Taylor theorized that Disney recruited singer Mya because of the film studio's relationship with the artist's record label, A&M/Interscope Records. At that time, Mya had recently released a cover of "Lady Marmalade" with singers Pink, Lil' Kim, and Christina Aguilera for the Moulin Rouge! soundtrack earlier that year, the lattermost of whom had made her musical debut recording "Reflection" for Disney's Mulan (1998). Rob Burch of The Hollywood News believes "Where the Dream Takes You" was initially intended to benefit Mya's career similar to how "Reflection" had launched Aguilera's. Atlantis: The Los Empire was Mya's second soundtrack contribution during the year 2001. While doing press for "Where The Dream Takes You", Mya announced she was preparing to record her then-upcoming third studio album, Moodring (2003).

"Where the Dream Takes You" was written by songwriter Diane Warren and the film's composer, James Newton Howard. While Howard composed the song's melody, Warren contributed to its music while writing its lyrics herself. Howard explained that Warren wrote lyrics to a musical theme he had composed for the film, in addition to making some melodic contributions of her own. Therefore, while both Warren and Howard are credited as composers, only Warren obtained a lyricist credit. "Where the Dream Takes You" was recorded at Royaltone Studios in North Hollywood, California. The track was produced by Ron Fair, Sol Survivor, and Robbie Buchanan, mixed by Dave Pensado, and engineered by Michael C. Ross. Both Fair and Buchanan played keyboards on the track, John Gux played guitar, and Alex Dunbar played bass guitar. Played during the film's end titles, "Where the Dream Takes You" is the only song from the film that features both music and lyrics, although it is not performed by any character within the context of the film itself because Atlantis: The Lost Empire is not a musical.

== Personnel ==
- Mya - vocals
- George Doering, John Goux - guitar
- Alex (Al) Dunbar - bass
- Robbie Buchanan, Ron Fair - keyboards

== Release ==
Distinguished from most film soundtracks, Atlantis: The Lost Empire features "Where the Dream Takes You" as its first track instead of its last. A&M/Interscope Records, Mya's record company at the time, and Walt Disney Records released "Where the Dream Takes You" as the only promotional single from the Atlantis: The Lost Empire soundtrack. It was sent to Top 40 and adult contemporary radio stations on June 5, 2001, to support the film ten days ahead of its June 15 theatrical release date. The single was accompanied by a music video starring Mya, in which she performs the song interpolated with scenes from the film. "Where the Dream Takes You" appears as the first track on the soundtrack before it is succeeded by Howard's orchestral score, which accounts for the remainder of the album.

Puerto Rican singer Chayanne covered the song in Spanish, entitled "Donde Va Tu Sueño", to promote the film's Latin American and Castilian releases. Recorded in Buenos Aires, Argentina, Chayanne co-wrote his rendition's Spanish lyrics with Renato Lopez, Walterio Pesqueira and Manny Benito. The Italian-Brazilian singer Deborah Blando do the same and released the song in Portuguese, titled "Junto Com Teu Sonho" to promote the film's in Brazil. The two-disc Taiwanese release of the soundtrack includes three additional versions of "Where the Dream Takes You" performed in three different languages by three different artists: Jolin Tsai in Mandarin, Joey Yong in Cantonese, and Kangta in Korean.

== Composition ==
"Where the Dream Takes You" is a "tender" pop power ballad, with "average pop fare". According to the song's official sheet music, published by Walt Disney Music Publishing on Musicnotes.com, "Where the Dream Takes You" is set in signature common time and performed at a moderate tempo of 88 beats per minute in the key of C major. The Disney Song Encyclopedia author Thomas S. Hischak believes that the song's lyrics are "about following your heart to find your true self", which begin "They'll try to hold you back, they will say you're wrong, but they will never understand, no, the journey that you're on." A writer for Barnes & Noble agreed that, thematically, the single "correlates to the film's tale of an inexperienced young adventurer", Milo Thatch, and its diverse cast of supporting characters, all of whom long to follow various dreams of their own as they search for Atlantis. James Barry of Soundtrack.Net describe it as an "obligatory follow your dreams tune". One of its verses reads, "There's something in your soul/That won't be denied/It's the faith to dream that keeps the dream alive/So you still believe and you know you must go", encouraging listeners to follow their dreams despite others' opinions.

Lasting a duration of four minutes, AllMusic cites the song's mood as both "earnest" and "mellow"; Mya performs it using a "sweet vocal", which spans two octaves from G3 to D♭5. Based on a melody heard only briefly during the film, "Where the Dream Takes You" encompasses "soft, contemporary beats" combined with the singer's "dulcet tones" that recall music played in a piano lounge, contrasting with the time period in which the film itself is set. Its production has been described as "polished".

== Reception ==
Hits magazine recognized the track as one of their "Hot New Releases" in their June 2001 issue, with contributor Billy Bored writing about Interscope's intentions to secure "big airplay". Ultimately, "Where the Dream Takes You" was both a commercial and critical disappointment despite Disney's efforts; the song has been met with generally negative reviews from music critics, who dismissed it as standard and uninspired. Although AllMusic's Jonathan Widran believed the song could potentially become a "pop hit", he ultimately dismissed it as "fairly generic Diane Warren-written fare." In Billboard, radio personality Charles Karel Bouley agreed that the song is "average pop fare" while acknowledging its Top 40 potential. Film Score Monthly's Lukas Kendall strongly disliked the ballad, writing, "The less said about ...'Where the Dream Takes You,' the better", and dismissed it as Warren's poor attempt to receive another Best Original Song Oscar nomination. James Barry of Soundtrack.Net wrote, "If I had to pick something to dislike, it'd be the song 'Where the Dream Takes You'" because "it suffers from sounding like so much other disposable end-credits music". Telenet's Thomas Glorieux opined that the track "fails to even stir up the attention because I find it a very ordinary song". Although The Current's Aaron Abelto found the song's lyrics "quite banal", he admitted it "is perfect for those who prefer airy LITE FM faire" and "will help you get to sleep at night".

Critics were also unimpressed with Mya's performance. Calling the singer "a curious choice" for "Where the Dream Takes You", Chuck Taylor of Billboard criticized Mya's vocals for failing "to lift the ballad beyond the mundane, while making it more than obvious that her talents are best-suited for uptempo, beat-heavy fare", and believes the single could have potentially benefited from a more powerful, seasoned vocalist.

Ranking "Where the Dream Takes You" among Disney's worst songs, Consequence of Sound's Dominick Suzanne-Mayer panned the ballad as "an addendum every bit as forgettable ... as the film in which it appears." In a similar listicle, Josh Spiegel of /Film called it bland and ranked it 324th. Veronica Superguide ranked "Where the Dream Takes You" among the 14 worst Disney songs, with the editors calling it generic and trivial as its film.

Where the Dream Takes You" was nominated for Best Original Song Written Directly for a Film at the World Soundtrack Awards in 2001.

== Live performances ==
To promote "Where the Dream Takes You," Mya performed the song at several media outlets. On the film's release day, June 15, 2001, Mya performed the song at Live with Regis & Kelly. Next, Mya performed the song at the event gala, An American Celebration at Ford's Theatre. Hosted by ABC journalist Sam Donaldson, the show originally tapped June 10, 2001, and featured a line-up of entertainers which included country singer Billy Gilman, country group SHeDAISY, comedian Jeff Foxworthy and opera singer Russell Watson. It aired August 21, 2001.
