= Atlantis: The Lost Empire =

2001 animated Disney film

- Theatrical release poster
- Directed by: Gary Trousdale; Kirk Wise
- Screenplay by: Tab Murphy
- Story by: Kirk Wise; Gary Trousdale; Joss Whedon; Bryce Zabel; Jackie Zabel; Tab Murphy
- Produced by: Don Hahn
- Starring: Michael J. Fox; James Garner; Cree Summer; Don Novello; Phil Morris; Claudia Christian; Jacqueline Obradors; Florence Stanley; David Ogden Stiers; John Mahoney; Jim Varney; Corey Burton; Leonard Nimoy
- Edited by: Ellen Keneshea
- Music by: James Newton Howard
- Production company: Walt Disney Feature Animation
- Distributed by: Buena Vista Pictures Distribution (Note: Distributed under the Walt Disney Pictures banner.)
- Release dates: June 3, 2001 (El Capitan Theatre); June 15, 2001 (United States)
- Running time: 96 minutes
- Country: United States
- Language: English
- Budget: $90–120 million
- Box office: $186.1 million

Atlantis: The Lost Empire is a 2001 American animated science fiction adventure film directed by Gary Trousdale and Kirk Wise, produced by Don Hahn, and written by Tab Murphy. Produced by Walt Disney Feature Animation, it stars Michael J. Fox, James Garner, Cree Summer, Don Novello, Phil Morris, Claudia Christian, Jacqueline Obradors, Florence Stanley, David Ogden Stiers, John Mahoney, Jim Varney, Corey Burton and Leonard Nimoy. Set in 1914, the film follows young linguist Milo Thatch (Fox), who gains possession of a sacred book, which he believes will guide him and a crew of mercenaries to the lost city of Atlantis.

Development of the film began after production had finished on The Hunchback of Notre Dame (1996). Instead of another musical, directors Trousdale and Wise, producer Hahn, and screenwriter Murphy decided to do an adventure film inspired by the works of Jules Verne. Atlantis: The Lost Empire was notable for adopting the distinctive visual style of comic book artist Mike Mignola, one of the film's production designers. The film made greater use of computer-generated imagery (CGI) than any of Disney's previous traditionally animated features and remains one of the few to have been shot in anamorphic format. Linguist Marc Okrand constructed an Atlantean language specifically for use in the film. James Newton Howard provided the film's musical score. The film was released at a time when audience interest in animated films was shifting away from traditional animation toward films with full CGI.

Atlantis: The Lost Empire premiered at the El Capitan Theatre in Hollywood, Los Angeles, on June 3, 2001, and went into its general release on June 15. The film received mixed reviews from critics. Budgeted at around $90–120 million, Atlantis grossed over $186 million worldwide, $84 million of which was earned in North America; its lackluster financial response was identified as a result of being released in competition with Shrek, Lara Croft: Tomb Raider, The Fast and the Furious and Dr. Dolittle 2. As a result of the film's box office failure, Disney cancelled a planned spin-off animated television series, Team Atlantis; an underwater Disneyland attraction; and a volcanic Magic Kingdom attraction based on it. Atlantis was nominated for several awards, including seven Annie Awards, and won Best Sound Editing at the 2002 Golden Reel Awards. The film was released on VHS and DVD on January 29, 2002, and on Blu-ray on June 11, 2013. Despite its initial reception, reception in later years became favorable and has given Atlantis a cult following and reappraisal from critics as a mistreated classic, due in part to Mignola's unique artistic influence. A direct-to-video sequel, Atlantis: Milo's Return, was released in 2003.

== Plot ==
In the ancient past, Atlantis is an advanced civilization with robotics and aviation. However, an apocalyptic explosion causes a megatsunami that destroys all but the core of its capital city, which “sinks beneath the waves” per Plato’s attestation.

Thousands of years later, in 1914, Washington, D.C. archaeo-linguist Milo Thatch obsesses over finding Atlantis. His employers ridicule his theories, but he gains an unexpected ally in eccentric millionaire Preston B. Whitmore, a friend of Milo's deceased adventurer grandfather who also sought the city. Determined to honor his old friend's quest, Whitmore recruits Milo for an expedition to Atlantis, having recently uncovered the Shepherd's Journal, an ancient Atlantean manuscript containing directions to the city.

Aboard the submarine Ulysses, Milo meets his teammates: Commander Lyle Tiberius Rourke, Lieutenant Helga Sinclair, demolitions expert Vincenzo Santorini, geologist Gaetan "Mole" Molière, medical officer Joshua Sweet, mechanic Audrey Ramirez, radio operator Wilhelmina Packard, mess cook Jebidiah "Cookie" Farnsworth, and a platoon of mercenaries. Upon reaching a cave entrance leading to the lost city, the submarine is destroyed by a massive robotic leviathan, killing most of the crew. Milo and the survivors escape in smaller craft, navigating through the cave to emerge among ancient ruins.

Milo translates the journal, guiding the team through caves beneath a dormant volcano until they reach the remains of Atlantis. There, they are greeted by Princess Kidagakash "Kida" Nedakh, who, despite being around 8,500 years old, has the appearance of a young woman. She leads them to her father, King Kashekim, who orders them to leave. Learning that Milo can read their language—a skill lost to the Atlanteans over millennia—Kida asks for his help in uncovering their forgotten history and technology, without which the city has declined and resources have dwindled. Milo learns that Atlantis is powered by the Heart of Atlantis, a massive crystal that grants longevity and health to its citizens through the smaller crystals they carry.

Rourke betrays Milo and the Atlanteans, revealing his intention to steal the Heart for profit, despite knowing the Atlanteans will perish without it. He mortally wounds the King while seizing control and uncovers the crystal beneath the city. Sensing danger, the Heart merges with Kida, who is then captured by Rourke. He departs with the crystallized Kida and his mercenaries; Vincenzo, Molière, Sweet, Audrey, Packard, and Cookie refuse to take part in the Atlanteans' destruction.

As he dies, the King reveals to Milo that the devastation of Atlantis was caused by his attempt to weaponize the crystal's power. To protect the city, the crystal merged with a royal family member: Kida's mother. This allowed them to create a protective dome over the city center, but Kida's mother never returned. To prevent the crystal from ever merging with Kida, the King hid it, accelerating Atlantis' decline. He warns Milo that Kida will be lost forever if she is not soon separated from the crystal and pleads with him to save her.

Alongside his allies, Milo rallies the Atlanteans to reactivate their long-dormant flying machines. In a climactic battle, they eliminate Rourke and his mercenaries in the volcano but also cause it to erupt. Milo and the others fly back to Atlantis with the crystallized Kida, who ascends into the air and awakens titanic stone guardians able to erect a shield barrier over the city. With Atlantis saved from the lava, the Heart separates from Kida and remains suspended in the sky.

Milo chooses to stay in Atlantis with Kida, having fallen in love with her. Before returning to the surface, Vincenzo, Molière, Sweet, Audrey, Packard, and Cookie each receive a small crystal and a share of treasure. The six reunite with Preston on the surface and agree to keep their adventure a secret to protect Atlantis. Preston opens a package from Milo containing his own crystal and a note thanking him. The newly crowned Queen Kida and Milo carve a stone effigy of her father to join those of past rulers floating beside the Heart of Atlantis. The city stands restored to its former glory.

== Voice cast ==
Production layout sketch of Milo and Kida. Milo's character design was based in part on sketches of the film's language consultant, Marc Okrand.

- Michael J. Fox as Milo James Thatch, a linguist and cartographer at the Smithsonian Institution who is recruited to decipher The Shepherd's Journal as part of an expedition to Atlantis.
- James Garner as Commander Lyle Tiberius Rourke, the leader of the band of mercenaries for the Atlantean expedition.
- Cree Summer as Kidagakash "Kida" Nedakh, the Princess of Atlantis and Milo's love interest.
  - Natalie Strom provided dialogue for Kida as a young child.
  - Summer also voiced the unnamed Queen of Atlantis, Kida's mother and Kashekim's wife who was "chosen" by the Crystal during the sinking of the city.
- John Mahoney as Preston B. Whitmore, an eccentric millionaire who funds the expedition to Atlantis. Lloyd Bridges was originally cast and recorded as Whitmore, but he died before completing the film. Mahoney's zest and vigor led to Whitmore's personality being reworked for the film.
- Claudia Christian as Lieutenant Helga Katrina Sinclair, Rourke's German-born second-in-command.
- Don Novello as Vincenzo "Vinny" Santorini, an Italian demolitions expert.
- Phil Morris as Dr. Joshua Strongbear Sweet, a medic of African-American and Arapaho descent.
- Jacqueline Obradors as Audrey Rocio Ramirez, a Puerto Rican mechanic and the youngest member of the expedition.
- Corey Burton as Gaetan "Mole" Molière, a French geologist who acts like a mole.
- Jim Varney as Jebidiah Allardyce "Cookie" Farnsworth, a Western-style chuckwagon chef. Varney died in February 2000, before the production ended, and the film was dedicated to his memory. Steven Barr recorded supplemental dialogue for Cookie.
- Florence Stanley as Wilhelmina Bertha Packard: an elderly, sarcastic, chain-smoking radio operator who is also the expedition's photographer.
- Leonard Nimoy as Kashekim Nedakh, the King of Atlantis and Kida's father.
- David Ogden Stiers as Fenton Q. Harcourt, a board member of the Smithsonian Institution who dismisses Milo's belief in the existence of Atlantis.

== Production ==
=== Development ===
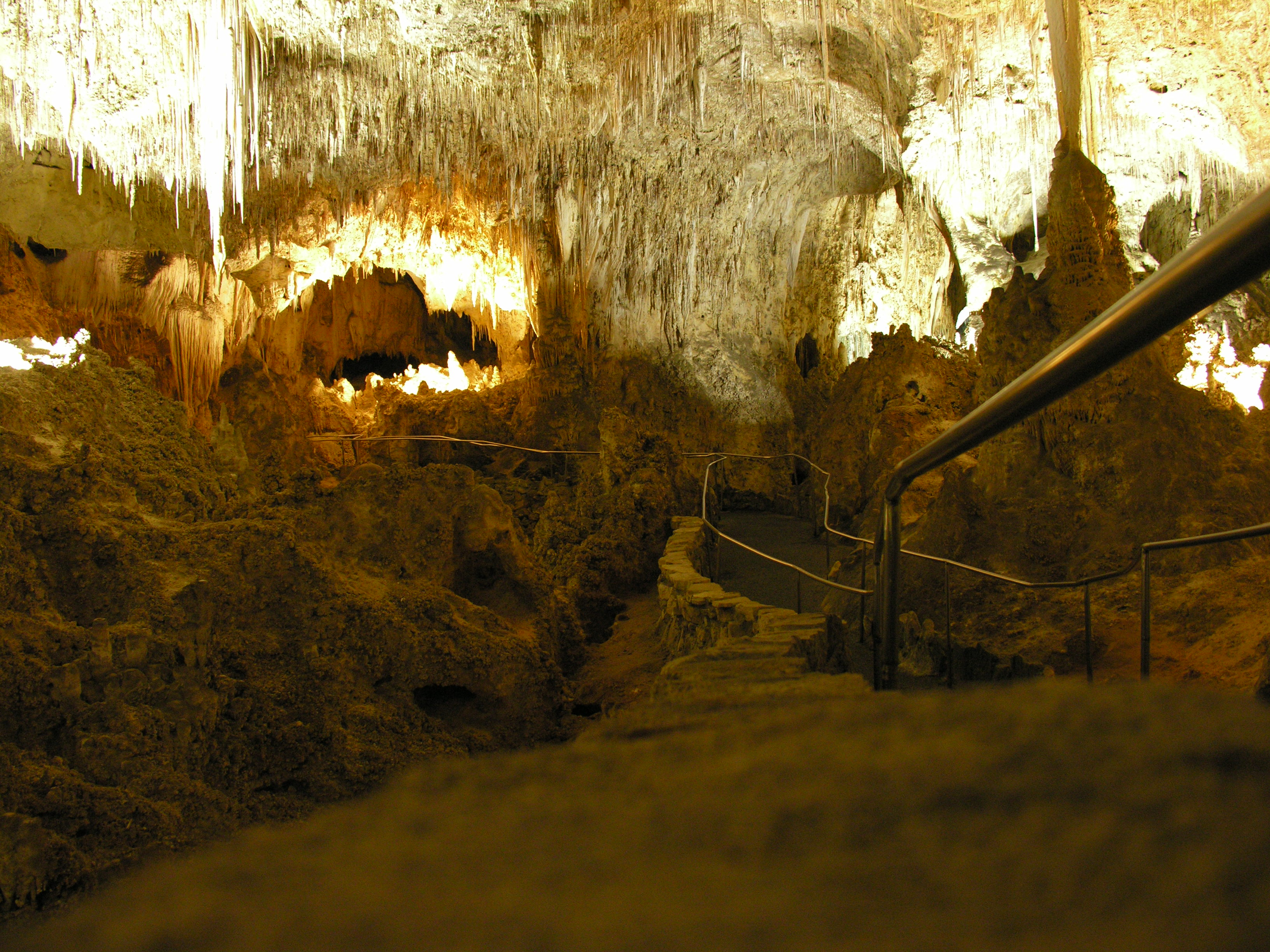
The production team visited New Mexico's Carlsbad Caverns to get a sense of the underground spaces depicted in the film.

The idea for Atlantis: The Lost Empire was conceived in October 1996 when Don Hahn, Gary Trousdale, Kirk Wise, and Tab Murphy lunched at a Mexican restaurant in Burbank, California. Having recently completed The Hunchback of Notre Dame, the producer, directors and screenwriter wanted to keep the Hunchback crew together for another film with an "Adventureland" setting rather than a "Fantasyland" setting. Drawing inspiration from Jules Verne's Journey to the Center of the Earth (1864) and Twenty Thousand Leagues Under the Seas (1870), they set out to make a film which would fully explore Atlantis (compared to the brief visit depicted in Verne's novel). While primarily utilizing the Internet to research the mythology of Atlantis, the filmmakers became interested in the clairvoyant readings of Edgar Cayce and decided to incorporate some of his ideas—notably that of a mother-crystal which provides power, healing, and longevity to the Atlanteans—into the story. They also visited museums and old army installations to study the technology of the early 20th century (the film's time period), and traveled underground in New Mexico's Carlsbad Caverns to view the subterranean trails which would serve as a model for the approach to Atlantis in the film.

The filmmakers wanted to avoid the common depiction of Atlantis as "crumbled Greek columns underwater", said Wise. "From the get-go, we were committed to designing it top to bottom. Let's get the architectural style, clothing, heritage, customs, how they would sleep, and how they would speak. So we brought people on board who would help us develop those ideas." Art director David Goetz stated, "We looked at Mayan architecture, styles of ancient, unusual architecture from around the world, and the directors really liked the look of Southeast Asian architecture." The team later took ideas from other architectural forms, including Cambodian, Indian, and Tibetan works. Hahn added, "If you take and deconstruct architecture from around the world into one architectural vocabulary, that's what our Atlantis looks like." The overall design and circular layout of Atlantis were also based on the writings of Plato, and his quote "in a single day and night of misfortune, the island of Atlantis disappeared into the depths of the sea" was influential from the beginning of production. The crew wore T-shirts which read "ATLANTIS—Fewer songs, more explosions" due to the film's plan as an action-adventure (unlike previous Disney animated features, which were musicals).

==== Language ====
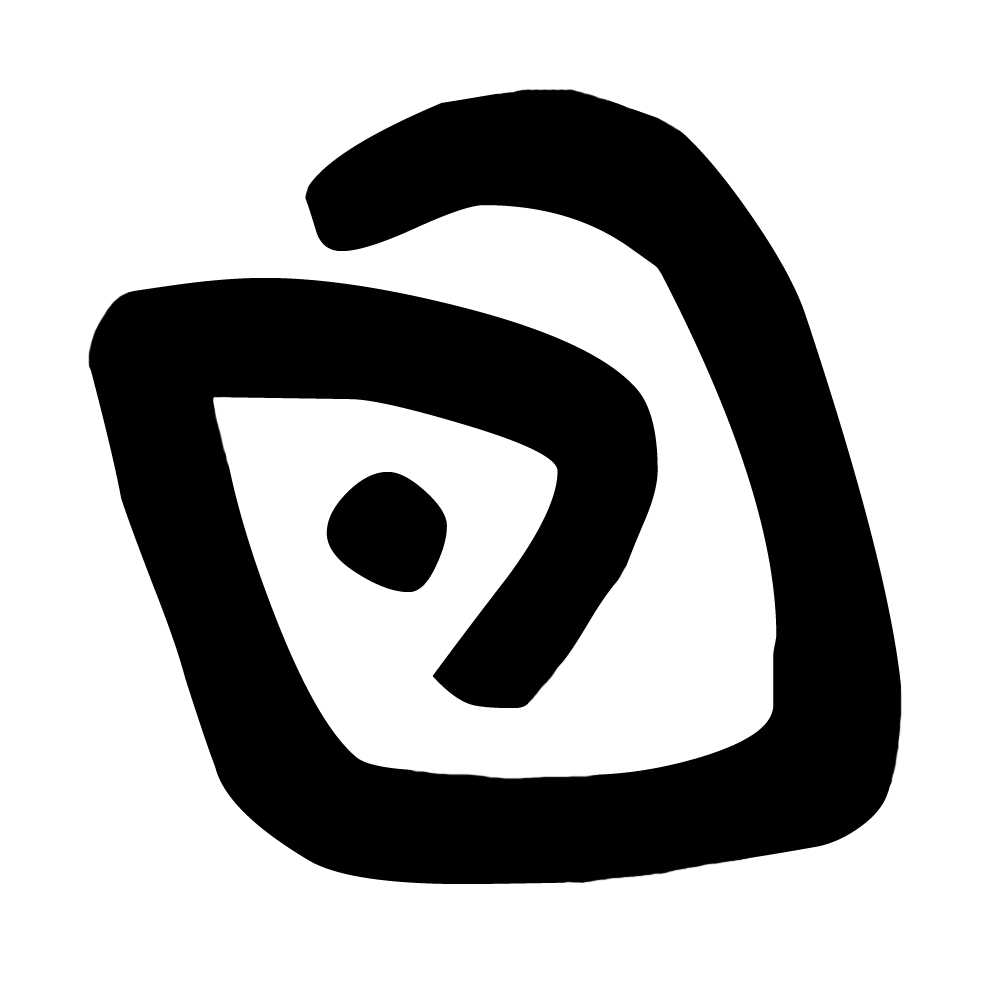
The Atlantean letter A, created by artist John Emerson. Kirk Wise noted that its design was a treasure map showing the path to the crystal, "The Heart of Atlantis".

Marc Okrand, who developed the Klingon language for the Star Trek television and theatrical productions, was hired to devise the Atlantean language for Atlantis: The Lost Empire. Guided by the directors' initial concept for it to be a "mother-language", Okrand employed an Indo-European word stock with its own grammatical structure. He would change the words if they began to sound too much like an actual, spoken language. John Emerson designed the written component, making hundreds of random sketches of individual letters from among which the directors chose the best to represent the Atlantean alphabet. The written language was boustrophedon: designed to be read left-to-right on the first line, then right-to-left on the second, continuing in a zigzag pattern to simulate the flow of water.

The Atlantean [A] is a shape developed by John Emerson. It is a miniature map of the city of Atlantis (i.e., the outside of the swirl is the cave, the inside shape is the silhouette of the city, and the dot is the location of the crystal). It's a treasure map.

— Kirk Wise, director

=== Writing ===
Joss Whedon was the first writer to be involved with the film but soon left to work on other Disney projects. According to him, he "had not a shred" in the movie. Tab Murphy completed the screenplay, stating that the time from initially discussing the story to producing a script that satisfied the film crew was "about three to four months". The initial draft was 155 pages, much longer than a typical Disney film script (which usually runs 90 pages). When the first two acts were timed at 120 minutes, the directors cut characters and sequences and focused more on Milo. Murphy said that he created the centuries-old Shepherd's Journal because he needed a map for the characters to follow throughout their journey. A revised version of the script eliminated the trials encountered by the explorers as they navigated the caves to Atlantis. This gave the film a faster pace because Atlantis is discovered earlier in the story.

The directors often described the Atlanteans using Egypt as an example. When Napoleon wandered into Egypt, the people had lost track of their once-great civilization. They were surrounded by artifacts of their former greatness but somehow unaware of what they meant.

— Don Hahn, producer

The character of Milo J. Thatch was originally supposed to be a descendant of Edward Teach, otherwise known as Blackbeard the pirate. The directors later related him to an explorer so he would discover his inner talent for exploration. The character of Molière was originally intended to be "professorial" but Chris Ure, a story artist, changed the concept to that of a "horrible little burrowing creature with a wacky coat and strange headgear with extending eyeballs", said Wise. Don Hahn pointed out that the absence of songs presented a challenge for a team accustomed to animating musicals, as action scenes alone would have to carry the film. Kirk Wise said it gave the team an opportunity for more on-screen character development: "We had more screen time available to do a scene like where Milo and the explorers are camping out and learning about one another's histories. An entire sequence is devoted to having dinner and going to bed. That is not typically something we would have the luxury of doing."

Hahn stated that the first animated sequence completed during production was the film's prologue. The original version featured a Viking war party using The Shepherd's Journal to find Atlantis and being swiftly dispatched by the Leviathan. Near the end of production, story supervisor John Sanford told the directors that he felt this prologue did not give viewers enough emotional involvement with the Atlanteans. Despite knowing that the Viking prologue was finished and it would cost additional time and money to alter the scene, the directors agreed with Sanford. Trousdale went home and completed the storyboards later that evening after visiting a strip club where he boarded the new sequence on a napkin. The opening was replaced by a sequence depicting the destruction of Atlantis, which introduced the film from the perspective of the Atlanteans and Princess Kida. The Viking prologue is included as an extra feature on the DVD release.

=== Casting ===
Kirk Wise, one of the directors, said that they chose Michael J. Fox for the role of Milo because they felt he gave his characters his own personality and made them more believable on screen. Fox said that voice acting was much easier than his past experience with live action because he did not have to worry about what he looked like in front of a camera while delivering his lines. The directors mentioned that Fox was also offered a role for Titan A.E.; he allowed his son to choose which film he would work on, and he chose Atlantis. Viewers have noted similarities between Milo and the film's language consultant, Marc Okrand, who developed the Atlantean language used in the film. Okrand stated that Milo's supervising animator, John Pomeroy, sketched him, claiming not to know how a linguist looked or acted. Kida's supervising animator, Randy Haycock, stated that her actress, Cree Summer, was very "intimidating" when he first met her; this influenced how he wanted Kida to look and act on screen when she meets Milo. Wise chose James Garner for the role of Commander Lyle Tiberius Rourke because of his previous experience with action films, especially war and Western films, and said the role "fits him like a glove". When asked if he would be interested in the role, Garner replied: "I'd do it in a heartbeat." Producer Don Hahn was saddened that Jim Varney, the voice of Jebidiah Allardyce "Cookie" Farnsworth, never saw the finished film before he died of lung cancer in February 2000, but mentioned that he was shown clips of his character's performance during his site sessions and said, "He loved it." Shawn Keller, supervising animator for Cookie, stated, "It was kind of a sad fact that [Varney] knew that he was not going to be able to see this film before he passed away. He did a bang-up job doing the voice work, knowing the fact that he was never gonna see his last performance." Steven Barr recorded supplemental dialogue for Cookie.

John Mahoney, who voiced Preston Whitmore, stated that doing voice work was "freeing" and allowed him to be "big" and "outrageous" with his character. Dr. Joshua Sweet's supervising animator, Ron Husband, indicated that one of the challenges was animating Sweet in sync with Phil Morris' rapid line delivery while keeping him believable. Morris stated that this character was extreme, with "no middle ground"; he mentioned, "When he was happy, he was really happy, and when he's solemn, he's real solemn." Claudia Christian described her character, Lieutenant Helga Katrina Sinclair, as "sensual" and "striking", and was relieved when she finally saw what her character looked like, joking, "I'd hate to, you know, go through all this and find out my character is a toad." Jacqueline Obradors said her character, Audrey Rocio Ramirez, made her "feel like a little kid again" and she always hoped her sessions would last longer. Florence Stanley felt that her character, Wilhelmina Bertha Packard, was very "cynical" and "secure": "She does her job, and when she is not busy, she does anything she wants." Corey Burton mentioned that finding his performance as Gaetan "Mole" Molière was by allowing the character to "leap out" of him while making funny voices. To get into character during his recording sessions, he stated that he would "throw myself into the scene and feel like I'm in this make-believe world". Kirk Wise and Russ Edmonds, supervising animator for Vincenzo "Vinny" Santorini, noted Vinny's actor Don Novello's unique ability to improvise dialogue while voicing the role. Edmonds recalled, "[Novello] would look at the sheet, and he would read the line that was written once, and he would never read it again! And we never used a written line, it was improvs, the whole movie." Michael Cedeno, supervising animator for King Kashekim Nedakh, was astounded at Leonard Nimoy's voice talent in the role, stating that he had "so much rich character" in his performance. As he spoke his lines, Cedeno said the crew would sit there and watch Nimoy in astonishment.

=== Animation ===
For comparison, the top image (panoramic view of Atlantis) is cropped to Disney's standard aspect ratio (1.66:1); the bottom image was seen in the film (2.35:1).

At the peak of its production, 350 animators, artists and technicians were working on Atlantis at all three Disney animation studios: Walt Disney Feature Animation (Burbank, California), Walt Disney Feature Animation Florida (Orlando), and Disney Animation France (Paris). The film was one of the few Disney animated features produced and shot in 35mm anamorphic format. The directors felt that a widescreen image was crucial, as a nostalgic reference to old action-adventure films presented in the CinemaScope format (2.35:1), noting Raiders of the Lost Ark as an inspiration. Because switching to the format would require animation desks and equipment designed for widescreen to be purchased, Disney executives were at first reluctant about the idea. The production team found a simple solution by drawing within a smaller frame on the same paper and equipment used for standard aspect ratio (1.66:1) Disney-animated films. Layout supervisor Ed Ghertner wrote a guide to the widescreen format for use by the layout artists and mentioned that one advantage of widescreen was that he could keep characters in scenes longer because of additional space to walk within the frame. Wise drew further inspiration for the format from filmmakers David Lean and Akira Kurosawa.

The film's visual style was strongly based upon that of Mike Mignola, the comic book artist behind Hellboy. Mignola was one of four production designers (along with Matt Codd, Jim Martin, and Ricardo Delgado) hired by the Disney studio for the film. Accordingly, he provided style guides, preliminary character, and background designs, and story ideas. "Mignola's graphic, the angular style was a key influence on the 'look' of the characters," stated Wise. Mignola was surprised when first contacted by the studio to work on Atlantis. His artistic influence on the film would later contribute to a cult following.

I remember watching a rough cut of the film and these characters have these big, square, weird hands. I said to the guy next to me, "Those are cool hands." And he says to me, "Yeah, they're your hands. We had a whole meeting about how to do your hands." It was so weird I couldn't wrap my brain around it.

— Mike Mignola

The final pull-out shot of the movie, immediately before the end-title card, was described by the directors as the most difficult shot in the history of Disney animation. They said that the pull-out attempt on their prior film, The Hunchback of Notre Dame, "struggled" and "lacked depth"; however, after making advances in the process of multiplaning, they tried the technique again in Atlantis. The shot begins with one 16-inch (40.6 cm) piece of paper showing a close-up of Milo and Kida. As the camera pulls away from them to reveal the newly restored Atlantis, it reaches the equivalent of an 18,000-inch (46,000 cm) piece of paper composed of many individual pieces of paper (24 inches [61 cm] or smaller). Each piece was carefully drawn and combined with animated vehicles simultaneously flying across the scene to make the viewer see a complete, integrated image.

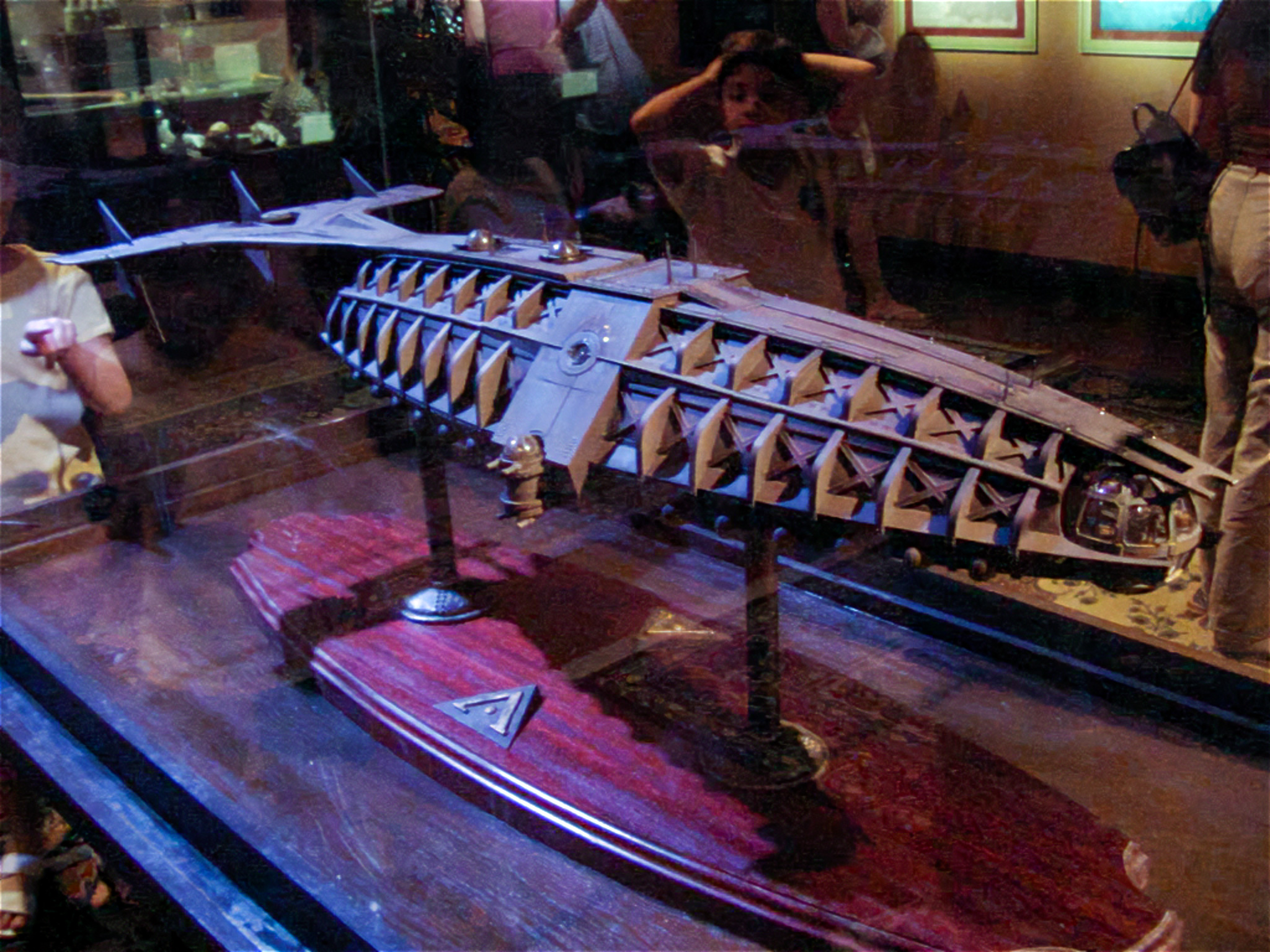
Scale model of Ulysses submarine by Greg Aronowitz, used by digital animators as reference during production.

At the time of its release, Atlantis: The Lost Empire was notable for using more computer-generated imagery (CGI) than any other Disney traditionally animated feature. To increase productivity, the directors had the digital artists work with the traditional animators throughout the production. Several important scenes required heavy use of digital animation: the Leviathan, the Ulysses submarine and sub-pods, the Heart of Atlantis, and the Stone Giants. During production, after Matt Codd and Jim Martin designed the Ulysses on paper, Greg Aronowitz was hired to build a scale model of the submarine, to be used as a reference for drawing the 3D Ulysses. The final film included 362 digital-effects shots, and computer programs were used to seamlessly join the 2D and 3D artwork. One scene that took advantage of this was the "sub-drop" scene, where the 3D Ulysses was dropped from its docking bay into the water. As the camera floated toward it, a 2D Milo was drawn to appear inside, tracking the camera. The crew noted that it was challenging to keep the audience from noticing the difference between the 2D and 3D drawings when they were merged. The digital production also gave the directors a unique "virtual camera" for complicated shots within the film. With the ability to operate in the z-plane, this camera moved through a digital wire-frame set; the background and details were later hand-drawn over the wireframes. This was used in the opening flight scene through Atlantis and the submarine chase through the undersea cavern with the Leviathan in pursuit.

=== Music and sound ===
Since the film would not feature any songs, the directors hired James Newton Howard to compose the score after they heard his music on Dinosaur. Approaching it as a live-action film, Howard decided to have different musical themes for the cultures of the surface world and Atlantis. In the case of Atlantis, Howard chose an Indonesian orchestral sound incorporating chimes, bells, and gongs. The directors told Howard that the film would have a number of key scenes without dialogue; the score would need to convey emotionally what the viewer was seeing on screen.

Gary Rydstrom and his team at Skywalker Sound were hired for the film's sound production. Like Howard, Rydstrom employed different sounds for the two cultures. Focusing on the machine and mechanical sounds of the early industrial era for the explorers, he felt that the Atlanteans should have a "more organic" sound utilizing ceramics and pottery. The sound made by the Atlantean flying-fish vehicles posed a particular challenge. Rydstrom revealed that he was sitting at the side of a highway recording one day when a semi-truck drove by at high speed. When the recording was sped up on his computer, he felt it sounded very organic, and decided to use it in the film. Rydstrom created the harmonic chiming of the Heart of Atlantis by rubbing his finger along the edge of a champagne flute, the sound of sub-pods moving through the water with a water pick, while a ceramic pot from a garden store was used for the sounds of the movement of the Giant stone guardians.

== Release ==
Atlantis: The Lost Empire had its world premiere at Disney's El Capitan Theatre in Hollywood, Los Angeles, on June 3, 2001 and a limited release in New York City and Los Angeles on June 8; a wider release followed on June 15. At the premiere, Destination: Atlantis was on display, featuring behind-the-scenes props from the film and information on the legend of Atlantis with video games, displays, laser tag, and other attractions. The Aquarium of the Pacific also loaned a variety of fish for display within the attraction.

=== Promotion ===
Atlantis was among Disney's first major attempts to utilize internet marketing. The film was promoted through Kellogg's, which created a website with mini-games and a movie-based video game give-away for UPC labels from specially marked packages of Atlantis breakfast cereal. The film was one of Disney's first marketing attempts through mobile network operators, and allowed users to download games based on the film. McDonald's (which had an exclusive licensing agreement on all Disney releases) promoted the film with Happy Meal toys, food packaging and in-store decor. The McDonald's advertising campaign involved television, radio, and print advertisements beginning on the film's release date. Frito-Lay offered free admission tickets for the film on specially marked snack packages.

=== Home media ===
Atlantis: The Lost Empire was released on VHS and DVD on January 29, 2002. During the first month of its home release, the film led in VHS sales and was third in VHS and DVD sales combined. Sales and rentals of the VHS and DVD combined would eventually accumulate $157 million in revenue by mid-2003. Both a single-disc DVD edition and a two-disc collector's edition (with bonus features) were released. The single-disc DVD gave the viewer the option of viewing the film either in its original theatrical 2.39:1 aspect ratio or a modified 1.33:1 ratio (utilizing pan and scan). Bonus features available on the DVD version included audio and visual commentary from the film team, a virtual tour of the CGI models, an Atlantean-language tutorial, an encyclopedia on the myth of Atlantis, and the deleted Viking prologue scene. The two-disc collector's edition DVD contained all the single-disc features and a disc with supplemental material detailing all aspects of the film's production. The collector's-edition film could only be viewed in its original theatrical ratio, and also featured an optional DTS 5.1 track. Both DVD versions, however, contained a Dolby Digital 5.1 track and were THX certified. Disney digitally remastered and released Atlantis on Blu-ray on June 11, 2013, bundled with its sequel Atlantis: Milo's Return.

== Reception ==
=== Box office ===
Before the film's release, reporters speculated that it would have a difficult run due to competition from Shrek and Lara Croft: Tomb Raider. Regarding the market's shift from traditional animation and competition with CG-animated films, Kirk Wise said, "Any traditional animator, including myself, can't help but feel a twinge. I think it always comes down to story and character, and one form won't replace the other. Just like photography didn't replace painting. But maybe I'm blind to it." Jeff Jensen of Entertainment Weekly noted that CGI films (such as Shrek) were more likely to attract the teenage demographic typically not interested in animation, and called Atlantis a "marketing and creative gamble".

Atlantis: the Lost Empire grossed $20.3 million on its debut weekend in 3,011 theaters, and opened at #2 behind Lara Croft: Tomb Raider ($48.2 million). During its second weekend, it dropped to #4 earning $13.2 million behind Tomb Raider and new releases, Dr. Dolittle 2 and The Fast and the Furious. The film's international release began September 20 in Australia and other markets followed suit.

With a budget of $100 million, Atlantis grossed over $84 million from the United States and Canada at the end of its 25-week theatrical run, and $186 million worldwide. Responding to its disappointing box-office performance, Thomas Schumacher, then-president of Walt Disney Feature Animation, said, "It seemed like a good idea at the time to not do a sweet fairy tale, but we missed."

=== Critical response ===
Atlantis: The Lost Empire received mixed reviews from critics, many of whom criticized its story. The review aggregator website Rotten Tomatoes reports that 48% of 144 professional critics have given Atlantis: The Lost Empire a positive review; the average rating is 5.5/10. The site's consensus is: "Atlantis provides a fast-paced spectacle, but stints on such things as character development and a coherent plot". Metacritic assigned the film a weighted average score of 52 out of 100 based on 29 reviews from critics, indicating "mixed or average" reviews. Audiences polled by CinemaScore gave the film an average grade of "A" on an A+ to F scale.

While critics had mixed reactions to the film in general, some praised it for its visuals, action-adventure elements, and attempt to appeal to an older audience. Roger Ebert gave Atlantis three-and-a-half stars out of four. He praised the animation's "clean bright visual look" and the "classic energy of the comic book style", crediting this to the work of Mike Mignola. Ebert gave particular praise to the story and the final battle scene and wrote, "The story of Atlantis is rousing in an old pulp science fiction sort of way, but the climactic scene transcends the rest, and stands by itself as one of the great animated action sequences." In The New York Times, Elvis Mitchell gave high praise to the film, calling it "a monumental treat", and stated, "Atlantis is also one of the most eye-catching Disney cartoons since Uncle Walt institutionalized the four-fingered glove." Internet film critic James Berardinelli wrote a positive review of the film, giving it three out of four stars. He wrote, "On the whole, Atlantis offers 90 minutes of solid entertainment, once again proving that while Disney may be clueless when it comes to producing good live-action movies, they are exactly the opposite when it comes to their animated division." Wesley Morris of the San Francisco Chronicle wrote positively of the film's approach for an older audience: "But just beneath the surface, Atlantis brims with adult possibility."

Other critics felt that the film was mediocre in regards to its story and characters, and that it failed to deliver as a non-musical to Disney's traditional audience. Owen Gleiberman of Entertainment Weekly gave the film a C+ rating, writing that the film had "gee-whiz formulaic character" and was "the essence of craft without dream". Kenneth Turan of the Los Angeles Times said the storyline and characterizations were "old-fashioned" and the film had the retrograde look of a Saturday-morning cartoon, but these deficiencies were offset by its "brisk action" and frantic pace. Todd McCarthy of Variety wrote, "Disney pushes into all-talking, no-singing, no-dancing and, in the end, no-fun animated territory." Stephanie Zacharek of Salon wrote of Disney's attempt to make the film for an adult audience, "The big problem with Disney's latest animated feature, Atlantis: The Lost Empire, is that it doesn't seem geared to kids at all: It's so adult that it's massively boring." Rita Kempley of The Washington Post panned the film, calling it a "new-fashioned but old-fangled hash" and wrote, "Ironically Disney had hoped to update its image with this mildly diverting adventure, yet the picture hasn't really broken away from the tried-and-true format spoofed in the far superior Shrek."

In 2015, Katharine Trendacosta at io9 reviewed the film and called it a "Beautiful Gem of a Movie That Deserved Better Than It Got" and said that the film deserves more love than it ended up getting. Lindsay Teal considers Atlantis to be "a lost Disney classic". Describing the film as highly entertaining, she praises the writing and characterisation – in particular, Sweet, Helga and Kida. In particular, much praise has been given to the character of Kida. Summer has regarded the character of Kida as one of her favourite roles and even considers the character among the official Disney Princess line-up.

=== Themes and interpretations ===
Several critics and scholars have noted that Atlantis plays strongly on themes of anti-capitalism and anti-imperialism. M. Keith Booker, academic and author of studies about the implicit messages conveyed by media, views the character of Rourke as being motivated by "capitalist greed" when he pursues "his own financial gain" in spite of the knowledge that "his theft [of the crystal] will lead to the destruction of [Atlantis]". Religion journalist Mark Pinsky, in his exploration of moral and spiritual themes in popular Disney films, says that "it is impossible to read the movie ... any other way" than as "a devastating, unrelenting attack on capitalism and American imperialism". Max Messier of FilmCritic.com observes, "Disney even manages to lambast the capitalist lifestyle of the adventurers intent on uncovering the lost city. Damn the imperialists!" According to Booker, the film also "delivers a rather segregationist moral" by concluding with the discovery of the Atlanteans kept secret from other surface-dwellers in order to maintain a separation between the two highly divergent cultures. Others saw Atlantis as an interesting look at utopian philosophy of the sort found in classic works of science fiction by H. G. Wells and Jules Verne.

=== Nadia: The Secret of Blue Water controversy ===
When the film was released, some viewers noticed that Atlantis: The Lost Empire was similar to the 1990-91 anime Nadia: The Secret of Blue Water, particularly in its character design, setting, and story. The similarities, as noted by viewers in both Japan and America, were strong enough for its production company Gainax to be called to sue for plagiarism. According to Gainax member Yasuhiro Takeda, they only refrained from doing so because the decision belonged to parent companies NHK and Toho. Another Gainax worker, Hiroyuki Yamaga, was quoted in an interview in 2000 as saying: "We actually tried to get NHK to pick a fight with Disney, but even the National Television Network of Japan didn't dare to mess with Disney and their lawyers. [...] We actually did say that but we wouldn't actually take them to court. We would be so terrified about what they would do to them in return that we wouldn't dare."

Although Disney never responded formally to those claims, co-director Kirk Wise posted on a Disney animation newsgroup in May 2001, "Never heard of Nadia till it was mentioned in this [newsgroup]. Long after we'd finished production, I might add." He claimed both Atlantis and Nadia were inspired, in part, by the 1870 Jules Verne novel Twenty Thousand Leagues Under the Seas. However, speaking about the clarification, Lee Zion from Anime News Network wrote, "There are too many similarities not connected with 20,000 Leagues for the whole thing to be coincidence." As such, the whole affair ultimately entered popular culture as a convincing case of plagiarism. In 2018, Reuben Baron from Comic Book Resources added to Zion's comment stating, "Verne didn't specifically imagine magic crystal-based technology, something featured in both the Disney movie and the too similar anime. The Verne inspiration also doesn't explain the designs being suspiciously similar to Nadia's."

Critics also saw parallels with the 1986 film Laputa: Castle in the Sky from Hayao Miyazaki and Studio Ghibli (which also featured magic crystals, and Atlantis directors Trousdale and Wise both acknowledged Miyazaki's works as a major influence on their own work) and with the 1994 film Stargate as Milo's characteristics were said to resemble those of Daniel Jackson, the protagonist of Stargate and its spinoff television series Stargate SG-1 — which coincidentally launched its own spinoff, titled Stargate Atlantis; the plot of the 1994 film is also paralleled involving a group visiting an unknown world, a fictional language made for the other world's people, the main protagonist having apparent knowledge of the people's culture, falling in love with one of the female locals and electing to stay behind when the others return home.

=== Accolades ===
Award	Category	Name	Result
29th Annie Awards	Individual Achievement in Directing	Gary Trousdale and Kirk Wise	Nominated
29th Annie Awards	Individual Achievement in Storyboarding	Chris Ure	Nominated
29th Annie Awards	Individual Achievement in Production Design	David Goetz	Nominated
29th Annie Awards	Individual Achievement in Effects Animation	Marlon West	Nominated
29th Annie Awards	Individual Achievement in Voice Acting – Female	Florence Stanley	Nominated
29th Annie Awards	Individual Achievement in Voice Acting – Male	Leonard Nimoy	Nominated
29th Annie Awards	Individual Achievement for Music Score	James Newton Howard	Nominated
2002 DVD Exclusive Awards	Original Retrospective Documentary	Michael Pellerin	Nominated
2002 Golden Reel Award	Best Sound Editing – Animated Feature Film	Gary Rydstrom, Michael Silvers, Mary Helen Leasman, John K. Carr, Shannon Mills, Ken Fischer, David C. Hughes, and Susan Sanford	Won
Online Film Critics Society Awards 2001	Best Animated Feature		Nominated
2002 Political Film Society	Democracy		Nominated
2002 Political Film Society	Human Rights		Nominated
2002 Political Film Society	Peace		Nominated
World Soundtrack Awards	Best Original Song for Film	Diane Warren and James Newton Howard	Nominated
Young Artist Awards	Best Feature Family Film – Drama	Walt Disney Feature Animation	Nominated

== Related works ==
Atlantis: The Lost Empire was meant to inspire an animated television series entitled Team Atlantis, which would have presented the further adventures of its characters. The series would have been akin to an animated steampunk version of The X-Files and feature a crossover with Gargoyles. However, because of the film's underperformance at the box office, the series was not produced. On May 20, 2003, Disney released a direct-to-video sequel titled Atlantis: Milo's Return, consisting of three episodes planned for the aborted series.

Disneyland planned to revive its Submarine Voyage ride with an Atlantis: The Lost Empire theme with elements from the movie. These plans were canceled and the attraction was re-opened in 2007 as the Finding Nemo Submarine Voyage, its theme based on Pixar's 2003 film Finding Nemo, which was far more successful commercially and critically. In addition, after the Submarine Voyage's Magic Kingdom counterpart, 20,000 Leagues Under the Sea: Submarine Voyage, closed down in 1994, four years before Disneyland's, there were proposals of a new attraction that would take its place, with one of them a volcano attraction inspired by that film's Vulcania location, being approved for the Magic Kingdom's Adventureland area. Around 1999, during development of Atlantis: The Lost Empire, it was decided that it would be themed to the movie, with it taking place in 1916, two years after the film's events. The ride would have focused on Preston Whitmore, a character from the film, seeking to make Atlantis existence public and offer expeditions to visitors in newly developed vehicles. However, due to mishaps, the vehicles would be forced to make a detour through the lava-filled caverns of the volcano. The attraction would have used a unique hybrid ride system, in which it would start as a standard coaster before the trains hook up to a suspended track midway through to fly through the caverns. The attraction would have been accessed by a new canyon path in between Pirates of the Caribbean and a re-routed Jungle Cruise that would have led to a Whitmore Enterprises base camp at the edge of the Walt Disney World Railroad path, with the mountain itself being built outside the berm. However, like the previous Submarine Voyage retheme, the ride was cancelled due to the film's disappointment in the box office.

=== Soundtrack ===
The soundtrack to Atlantis: The Lost Empire was released on May 22, 2001. It consists primarily of James Newton Howard's score and includes "Where the Dream Takes You", written by Howard and Diane Warren and performed by Mýa. It was also available in a limited edition of 20,000 numbered copies with a unique 3D album cover insert depicting the Leviathan from the film. A rare promotional edition (featuring 73 minutes of material, compared to the 53 minutes on standard commercial editions) was intended only for Academy of Motion Picture Arts and Sciences voters but was bootlegged and distributed with fan-created artwork. The Japanese release has "Crystal Vine", written by DREAMS COME TRUE play during the end credits. The German release has "Atlantis 2002", a re-recording of Donovan's song "Atlantis" and performed with the german pop group No Angels play during the end credits.

=== Video games ===
There are several video games based on the film. Atlantis: The Lost Empire – Search for the Journal and Atlantis: The Lost Empire – Trial by Fire were developed by Zombie Studios and published by Disney Interactive. Both games were released exclusively for Microsoft Windows computers. Disney distributed over 12 million discs with a demo version of Search for the Journal in Kellogg's cereal boxes and other promotional venues. Atlantis: The Lost Empire – The Lost Games was released by Disney Interactive for children ages 5 and up, and was compatible with both Windows and Classic Mac OS computers.

Atlantis: The Lost Empire is an action-adventure game developed by Eurocom Entertainment Software and published by Sony Computer Entertainment for the PlayStation console. The player controls Milo, Audrey, Molière, Kida, and Vinny as they traverse Atlantis, unlocking its secrets. Some features in the game unlock others (such as a movie) by finding items hidden throughout the game. THQ released Atlantis: The Lost Empire for the Game Boy Advance and Game Boy Color. On Game Boy Color, it is a platform game also developed by Eurocom Entertainment Software in which the player controls Milo, Audrey, Molière, and Vinny on a quest to discover Atlantis. On Game Boy Advance, it is a platform game developed by 3d6 Games that hinges on searching and collecting crystals.

=== Comic books ===
Atlantis: The Lost Empire - The Curse of Kurok is a comic book sequel to the original film, releasing October 13, 2026. The book is written by Matthew K. Manning and Illustrated by Christian Colbert. The book follows Milo and Kida fighting against a new threat using the history of Atlantis to fight back.

== Legacy ==
On June 15, 2021, Disney posted on Twitter: "20 years ago today, Milo Thatch journeyed to Atlantis. Happy anniversary to this epic 2001 adventure!" A limited commemorative pin was also released by the company for the anniversary. Cast and crew of the movie also celebrated its anniversary by partaking in a 5-hour livestream on YouTube which had been organized by fans of the film through several platforms as an event and was planned the year before in advance. A year later, the cast and crew reunited again on another livestream as part of The Tammy Tuckey Show who had also hosted the previous year's stream.

== See also ==
- Atlantis in popular culture
- 20,000 Leagues Under the Sea
- Indiana Jones
- List of underwater science fiction works
- Kimba the White Lion and The Lion King controversy, a similar plagiarism controversy
- The Road to El Dorado, another animated film which has gained a cult following
- Stargate Atlantis

== Bibliography ==
=== Books ===
- Booker, M. Keith (2009). Disney, Pixar, and the Hidden Messages of Children's Films. Westport, CT: Praeger. ISBN 978-0-313-37672-6. Archived from the original on May 13, 2016.
- Kurtti, Jeff (2001). Atlantis: The Lost Empire—The Illustrated Script. Burbank, CA: Disney Press. ISBN 978-0-7868-5327-4.
- Lavery, David; Burkhead, Cynthia, eds. (2011). Joss Whedon: Conversations. Jackson, MS: University Press of Mississippi. ISBN 978-1-60473-923-7. Archived from the original on June 24, 2016.
- Montalbano, Dave (2010). The Adventures of Cinema Dave in the Florida Motion Picture World. Xlibris. ISBN 978-1-4500-2396-2. Archived from the original on April 25, 2016.
- Patten, Fred (2004). "Simba–Kimba Redux? The Nadia Versus Atlantis Affair". Watching Anime, Reading Manga: 25 Years of Essays and Reviews. Berkeley, CA: Stone Bridge Press. pp. 185–189. ISBN 978-1-880656-92-1. Archived from the original on April 29, 2016.
- Pinsky, Mark I. (2004). "Chapter 31: Atlantis (2001): Adventure Capitalism". The Gospel According to Disney: Faith, Trust, and Pixie Dust. Louisville, KY: Westminster John Knox Press. pp. 194–202. ISBN 978-0-664-22591-9. Archived from the original on April 24, 2016.
- Plato (1929) [c. 360 BCE]. "Timaeus". Plato; in Twelve Volumes, with an English Translation—Vol. 9: Timaeus, Critias, Cleitophon, Menexenus, Epistles. Robert Gregg Bury, trans. Cambridge, MA: Harvard University Press. OCLC 24252251. Archived from the original on March 8, 2021.
- Raugust, Karen (2004). The Animation Business Handbook. New York City, NY: St. Martin's Press. ISBN 978-1-4299-6228-5.

=== DVD media ===
- Don Hahn (prod.), Gary Trousdale (dir.), & Kirk Wise (dir.) (January 29, 2002). Atlantis: The Lost Empire—Audio Commentary (DVD). Disc 1 of 2 (Collector's ed.). Burbank, CA: Walt Disney Studios Home Entertainment. UPC 786936163872.
- Various cast and crew members (January 29, 2002). Atlantis: The Lost Empire—Supplemental Features (DVD). Disc 2 of 2 (Collector's ed.). Burbank, CA: Walt Disney Studios Home Entertainment. UPC 786936163872.

=== Periodicals ===
- Vancheri, Barbara; Weiskind, Ron (July 17, 2003). "Nemo-like Stories Pulling Folks into Animated Movies". Pittsburgh Post-Gazette. p. D–2.
