= Atlantis: The Lost Empire (soundtrack) =

Film score by James Newton Howard
- Released: May 21, 2001
- Length: 53:56
- Label: Walt Disney
- Producers: James Newton Howard; Jim Weidman

Singles from Atlantis: The Lost Empire
- 1. "Where the Dream Takes You" Released: June 5, 2001

Professional ratings
Review scores
Source	Rating
SoundtrackNet	4/5 stars

Atlantis: The Lost Empire, released on May 21, 2001, is the soundtrack to the 2001 Disney animated film of the same name. Consisting primarily of James Newton Howard's score, it also includes the Diane Warren penned song, "Where the Dream Takes You", performed by Mýa.

"Come Sail Away" by Styx was used in various advertisements for the film, but not in the film itself. Also, "Wipeout" is used in one of the advertisements though is not in the film itself.

The Japanese release has "Crystal Vine", written by DREAMS COME TRUE play during the end credits. The Korean release has the song "Dream" by Kangta.

== Track listing ==
All music is composed by James Newton Howard, except "Where the Dream Takes You" by Diane Warren and Howard.

Atlantis: The Lost Empire Original Soundtrack
No.	Title	Length
1.	"Where the Dream Takes You (performed by Mýa)"	4:00
2.	"The Submarine"	3:20
3.	"Milo's Turned Down"	1:48
4.	"Atlantis Is Waiting"	2:41
5.	"The Leviathan"	3:25
6.	"Bedding Down"	2:32
7.	"The Journey"	3:22
8.	"Fireflies"	2:11
9.	"Milo Meets Kida"	1:46
10.	"The City of Atlantis"	2:48
11.	"Milo and Kida's Questions"	2:59
12.	"Touring the City"	2:51
13.	"The Secret Swim"	2:46
14.	"The Crystal Chamber"	3:45
15.	"The King Dies / Going After Rourke"	5:12
16.	"Just Do It"	3:18
17.	"Kida Returns"	3:10
18.	"Atlantis"	2:01
Total length:		53:56
